= Grand Lodge of Canada in the Province of Ontario =

Masonic lodge in Hamilton, Ontario, Canada

Grand Lodge of A.F. & A.M. of Canada in the Province of Ontario
- Current logo
- Established: 10 November 1855; 171 years ago
- Location: Canada
- Coordinates: 43.2595°N 79.8802°W
- Region served: Ontario
- Grand Master: M.W. Art DiCecco
- Website: ontariomasons.ca

The Grand Lodge of Ancient Free and Accepted Masons of Canada in the Province of Ontario is a Grand Lodge with jurisdiction over 571 masonic lodges located in the province of Ontario in Canada with around 46,000 members. The Grand Lodge is in full amity and recognition with the United Grand Lodge of England. The Grand Lodge publishes an annual magazine Ontario Mason.

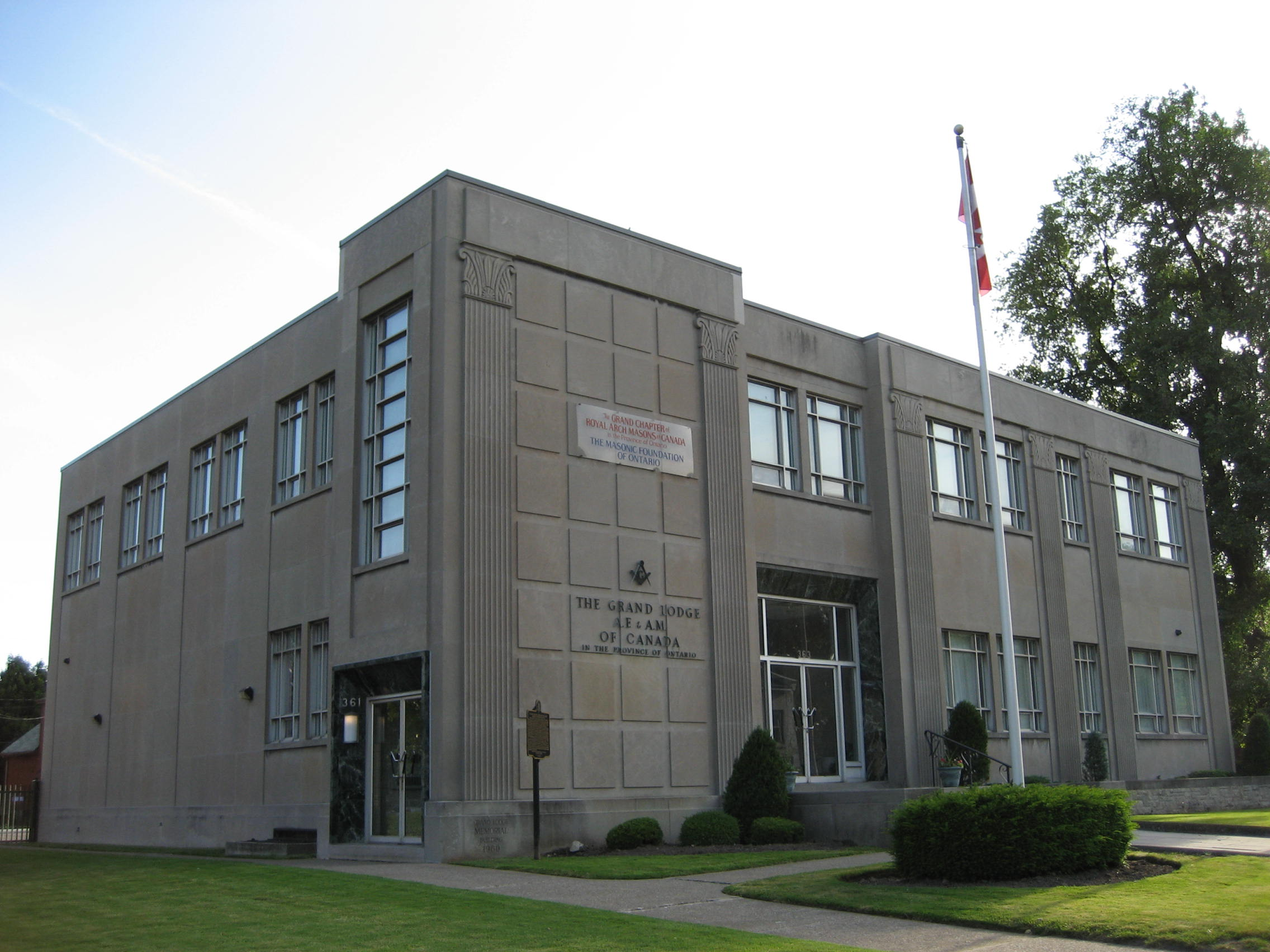
Grand Lodge building on King Street West in Hamilton

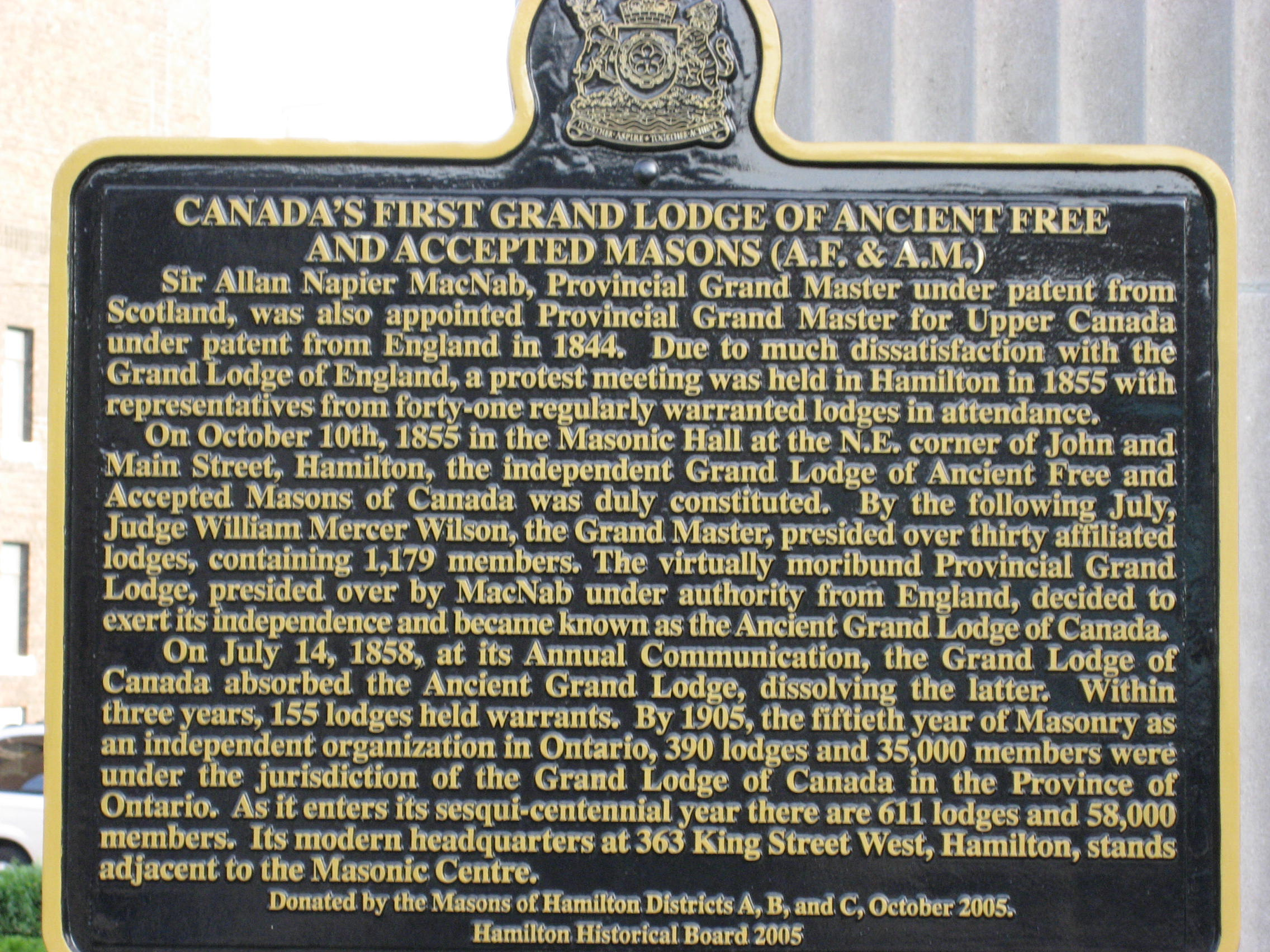
Historical plaque

== History ==
=== Provincial Grand Lodge ===
The Provincial Grand Lodge of Upper Canada was formed at the request of Alexander Wilson by the Grand Lodge of England in 1792. Its first Provincial Grand Master was William Jarvis. However, unlike Prince Edward, the Provincial Grand Master for the Provincial Grand Lodge of Lower Canada, William Jarvis was not endowed by the Grand Lodge of England with the power to grant warrants for new lodges.

=== Formation ===
Growing dissatisfaction within the members of the Provincial Grand Lodge of Upper Canada with the slow responses of the Grand Lodge of England in forwarding warrants, certificates and the like led to the question of whether it was time to create an independent grand lodge in Canada. After a Provincial Grand Lodge meeting in which the idea was ruled out of order by the Deputy Grand Master, the officers met and formed the Grand Lodge of Canada on 10 October 1855. Its officers were elected the next day, with William Mercer Wilson being elected the first Grand Master of the newly created Grand Lodge, and installed on 2 November.

=== Growth, split and name change ===
Over the next few years the Grand Lodge went about petitioning the lodges of Canada West to come under the fold of their newly created Grand Lodge. Within a few years, not only were almost all the masonic lodges of Canada West under the jurisdiction of the GLC, but, since 1859, so were most of the lodges of Canada East. However, in 1869, sixteen of the lodges in Quebec (formerly Canada East) formed their own Grand Lodge, and in 1874 the Grand Lodge of Canada completely withdrew from the province of Québec, and twenty-four more lodges moved from the Grand Lodge of Canada to the Grand Lodge of Quebec. In 1887 the name of the Grand Lodge was changed to the Grand Lodge of Canada in the Province of Ontario, a compromise name which reflects both the Ontario-only jurisdiction of the Grand Lodge as well as its history of being the first Grand Lodge in Canada.

== Organization ==
Grand Lodge is ruled and governed by the Grand Master with the assistance of Deputy Grand Master. Both are elected by the brethren for a two-year term. The craft lodges under the jurisdiction are organised into 38 districts each headed by a District Deputy Grand Master. The entire operation is overseen by the Board consisting of elected and appointed brethren.

== Recognition ==
According to the document published by the Grand Lodge, as July 2023 it officially recognises the Grand Lodges listed below. A member hailing from a lodge under warrant from any of these Grand Lodges may be received as a visitor, if he can prove himself to be a member in good standing. Members of other Grand Lodges cannot be recognized or received.

Canada and United States	Europe	Latin America	Africa, Asia and Oceania
All 9 provinces (not counting Ontario), including: British Columbia and Yukon; Manitoba; Newfoundland and Labrador; All 50 states and the District of Columbia, including: Alabama; California; Connecticut; Idaho; Kansas; Kentucky; Massachusetts; Michigan; Minnesota; Missouri; Nebraska; New Jersey; New Mexico; New York; North Dakota; Ohio; Pennsylvania; Tennessee; Texas; Virginia; West Virginia; Wisconsin; Also the Prince Hall Grand Lodges of: Alaska; Connecticut; District of Columbia; Maryland & Jurisdictions; Minnesota; North Carolina; Ontario & Jurisdiction; Pennsylvania	Albania; Andorra; Armenia; Austria; Belgium, Regular; Bulgaria, United; Croatia; Cyprus; Czech Republic; Denmark; Estonia; Finland; France, Nationale; Georgia; Germany, United; Greece; Hungary; Iceland; Italy, Grand Orient; Latvia; Luxembourg; Macedonia; Malta; Moldova; Montenegro; Netherlands; Norway; Portugal, Legal & Regular; Romania, National; Russia; San Marino; Serbia; Slovenia; Spain; Sweden; Switzerland, Alpina; Turkey; Ukraine; United Kingdom: England; Ireland; Scotland	Argentina; Bolivia; Brazil, Grand Orient, plus 23 of 26 states (all save Alagoas, Piauí and Roraima); Chile; Colombia; Costa Rica; Cuba; Dominican Republic; Ecuador; Guatemala; Honduras; Mexico; Panama; Paraguay, Symbolic; Peru; Puerto Rico; Uruguay; Venezuela	Australia - all 6 states including: New South Wales; Benin; Burkina Faso; Cameroun; China (Taiwan); Gabon; India; Iran; Israel; Ivory Coast; Japan; Madagascar; Malian, National; Mauritius; Morocco; New Zealand; Philippines; Senegal; South Africa; Togolaise, Nationale

== See also ==
- List of Masonic Grand Lodges in Canada
