= List of Masonic Grand Lodges in the United States =

This is a list of all verifiable organizations that claim to be a Masonic Grand Lodge in United States.

A Masonic Grand Lodge (or sometimes "Grand Orient") is the governing body that supervises the individual Masonic lodges in a particular geographical area, known as its "jurisdiction" and usually corresponding to a sovereign state or other major geopolitical unit. Some are large, with thousands of members divided into hundreds of subordinate lodges, while others are tiny, with only a few members split between a handful or even a single local lodges. Sometimes there will only be one Grand Lodge in a given area, but the majority of the time there will be at least two. Occasionally, there will be several competing Grand Lodges claiming the same jurisdictional area, or claiming overlapping areas. This fact leads to debates over legitimacy. Not all Grand Lodges and Grand Orients recognize each other as being legitimate. However, such recognition is not relevant to this list, yet recognition is foundational within the fraternal order.

Inclusion in this list only requires the establishment of a physical (as opposed to a virtual, or online) presence, and lodges (regular, unrecognized or clandestine) which acknowledge their governance.

Membership numbers are subject to change and some are outdated; for current figures, check the sources which are indicated in the reference section.

== Grand Lodges in the United States that are members of the Conference of Grand Masters in North America or have Prince Hall Affiliation ==
In 2023, the total membership of all United States Grand Lodges that are members of the Conference of Grand Masters in North America was 869,429.

State	Headquarters City	Name	Founded	Lodges	Members	Affiliation
Alabama	Millbrook	Grand Lodge of Alabama	1821	299	17,830	CGMNA
Alabama	Birmingham	Prince Hall Grand Lodge of Alabama	1870	235	6,000	PHCGM, PHA
Alaska	Anchorage	Grand Lodge of Alaska	1981	20	1,377	CGMNA
Alaska	Anchorage	Prince Hall Grand Lodge of Alaska	1969	7	315	PHCGM, PHA
Arizona	Gilbert	Grand Lodge of Arizona	1882	58	5,748	CGMNA
Arizona	Phoenix	Prince Hall Grand Lodge of Arizona	1920	9	313	PHCGM, PHA
Arkansas	Little Rock	Grand Lodge of Arkansas	1838	243	10,692	CGMNA
Arkansas	Pine Bluff	Prince Hall Grand Lodge of Arkansas	1870	118	3,200	PHCGM, PHA
California	San Francisco	Grand Lodge of California	1850	338	39,845	CGMNA
California	Los Angeles	Prince Hall Grand Lodge of California	1855	57	4,200	PHCGM, PHA
Colorado	Colorado Springs	Grand Lodge of Colorado	1861	131	5,250	CGMNA
Colorado	Denver	Prince Hall Grand Lodge of Colorado and its Jurisdictions	1876	17	833	PHCGM, PHA
Connecticut	Wallingford	Grand Lodge of Connecticut	1789	94	7,669	CGMNA
Connecticut	Hartford	Prince Hall Grand Lodge of Connecticut	1873	15	1,500	PHCGM, PHA
Delaware	Wilmington	Grand Lodge of Delaware	1806	28	3,764	CGMNA
Delaware	Dover	Prince Hall Grand Lodge of Delaware	1849	17	800	PHCGM, PHA
District of Columbia	Washington	Grand Lodge of District of Columbia	1811	42	3,672	CGMNA
District of Columbia	Washington	Prince Hall Grand Lodge of District of Columbia	1848	26	5,100	PHCGM, PHA
Florida	Jacksonville	Grand Lodge of Florida	1830	290	30,339	CGMNA
Florida	Jacksonville	Union Grand Lodge of Florida and Belize, Central America Jurisdiction, Prince Hall Affiliated	1870	114	6,500	PHCGM, PHA
Georgia	Macon	Grand Lodge of Georgia	1786	428	27,551	CGMNA
Georgia	Riverdale	Prince Hall Grand Lodge of Georgia	1870	194	10,107	PHCGM, PHA
Hawaii	Honolulu	Grand Lodge of Hawaii	1989	11	1,617	CGMNA
Hawaii	Mililani	Prince Hall Grand Lodge of Hawaii	2001	7		PHCGM, PHA
Idaho	Boise	Grand Lodge of Idaho	1867	48	2,198	CGMNA
Illinois	Springfield	Grand Lodge Of Illinois	1840	498	45,774	CGMNA
Illinois	Chicago	Prince Hall Grand Lodge of the State of Illinois	1867	71		PHCGM, PHA
Indiana	Indianapolis	Grand Lodge of Indiana	1818	416	40,801	CGMNA
Indiana	Fishers	Prince Hall Grand Lodge of Indiana	1956	37	2,100	PHCGM, PHA
Iowa	Cedar Rapids	Grand Lodge of Iowa	1844	282	12,318	CGMNA
Iowa	Des Moines	Prince Hall Grand Lodge of Iowa	1881	6		PHCGM, PHA
Kansas	Emporia	Grand Lodge of Kansas	1856	237	12,176	CGMNA
Kansas	Topeka	Prince Hall Grand Lodge of Kansas	1875	42	1,392	PHCGM, PHA
Kentucky	Louisville	Grand Lodge of Kentucky	1800	397	24,012	CGMNA
Kentucky	Lousiville	Prince Hall Grand Lodge of Kentucky	1866	67	2,400	PHCGM, PHA
Louisiana	Alexandria	Grand Lodge of Louisiana	1812	252	12,329	CGMNA
Louisiana	Baton Rouge	Prince Hall Grand Lodge of Louisiana	1863	169	7,823	PHA
Maine	Holden	Grand Lodge of Maine	1820	185	13,891	CGMNA
Maryland	Cockeysville	Grand Lodge of Maryland	1787	100	10,503	CGMNA
Maryland	Baltimore	Prince Hall Grand Lodge of Maryland	1845	98	4,762	PHCGM, PHA
Massachusetts	Boston	Grand Lodge of Massachusetts	1733	245	20,079	CGMNA
Massachusetts	Dorchester	Prince Hall Grand Lodge of Massachusetts	1791	27	1,287	PHCGM, PHA
Michigan	Alma	Grand Lodge of Michigan	1826	304	21,545	CGMNA
Michigan	Detroit	Prince Hall Grand Lodge of Michigan	1866	47	2,900	PHCGM, PHA
Minnesota	Bloomington	Grand Lodge of Minnesota	1853	156	8,866	CGMNA
Minnesota	Minnesapolis	Prince Hall Grand Lodge of Minnesota	1894	14	400	PHCGM, PHA
Mississippi	Meridian	Grand Lodge of Mississippi	1818	247	11,369	CGMNA
Mississippi	Jackson	Stringer Grand Lodge of Mississippi	1873	357	17,910	PHCGM, PHA
Missouri	Columbia	Grand Lodge of Missouri	1821	350	25,886	CGMNA
Missouri	St. Louis	Prince Hall Grand Lodge of Missouri	1866	64	2,549	PHCGM, PHA
Montana	Helena	Grand Lodge of Montana	1866	94	3,374	CGMNA
Nebraska	Lincoln	Grand Lodge of Nebraska	1857	139	7,150	CGMNA
Nebraska	Lincoln	Prince Hall Grand Lodge of Nebraska	1919	8	286	PHCGM, PHA
Nevada	Reno	Grand Lodge of Nevada	1865	42	3,030	CGMNA
Nevada	North Las Vegas	Prince Hall Grand Lodge of Nevada	1960	6	165	PHCGM, PHA
New Hampshire	Manchester	Grand Lodge of New Hampshire	1789	65	4,070	CGMNA
New Jersey	Trenton	Grand Lodge of New Jersey	1786	122	13,142	CGMNA
New Jersey	Newark	Prince Hall Grand Lodge of New Jersey	1848	52	3,145	PHCGM, PHA
New Mexico	Santa Fe	Grand Lodge of New Mexico	1877	57	2,754	CGMNA
New Mexico	Albuquerque	Prince Hall Grand Lodge of New Mexico	1921	7		PHCGM, PHA
New York	New York City, Manhattan, Chelsea	Grand Lodge of New York	1781	466	27,296	CGMNA
New York	New York City, Manhattan, Washington Heights	Prince Hall Grand Lodge of New York	1845	72	5,300	PHCGM, PHA
North Carolina	Raleigh	Grand Lodge of North Carolina	1787	372	33,013	CGMNA
North Carolina	Durham	Prince Hall Grand Lodge of North Carolina	1870	263	10,315	PHCGM, PHA
North Dakota	Fargo	Grand Lodge of North Dakota	1889	45	2,439	CGMNA
Ohio	Springfield	Grand Lodge of Ohio	1808	503	61,746	CGMNA
Ohio	Columbus	Prince Hall Grand Lodge of Ohio	1849	62	4,904	PHCGM, PHA
Oklahoma	Guthrie	Grand Lodge of Oklahoma	1874	223	15,642	CGMNA
Oklahoma	Muskogee	Prince Hall Grand Lodge of Oklahoma	1893	129	6,000	PHCGM, PHA
Oregon	Forest Grove	Grand Lodge of Oregon	1851	112	6,088	CGMNA
Oregon	n/a	Prince Hall Grand Lodge of Oregon, Idaho and Montana	1960	4	143	PHCGM, PHA
Pennsylvania	Philadelphia	Grand Lodge of Pennsylvania	1731	428	76,313	CGMNA
Pennsylvania	Philadelphia	Prince Hall Grand Lodge of Pennsylvania	1797	107	7,600	PHCGM, PHA
Rhode Island	East Providence	Grand Lodge of Rhode Island	1791	25	2,775	CGMNA
Rhode Island	Providence	Prince Hall Grand Lodge of Rhode Island	1858	4	280	PHCGM, PHA
South Carolina	Lexington	Grand Lodge of South Carolina, A.F.M.	1737	297	26,518	CGMNA
South Carolina	Columbia	Prince Hall Grand Lodge of South Carolina	1867	306	16,000	PHCGM, PHA
South Dakota	Sioux Falls	Grand Lodge of South Dakota	1875	83	4,115	CGMNA
Tennessee	Nashville	Grand Lodge of Tennessee	1813	333	27,587	CGMNA
Tennessee	Memphis	Prince Hall Grand Lodge of Tennessee	1870	172	6,500	PHCGM, PHA
Texas	Waco	Grand Lodge of Texas	1837	856	67,553	CGMNA
Texas	Fort Worth	Prince Hall Grand Lodge of Texas	1875	424	10,400	PHCGM, PHA
Utah	Salt Lake City	Grand Lodge of Utah	1872	30	1,469	CGMNA
Vermont	Berlin	Grand Lodge of Vermont	1794	88	3,500	CGMNA
Virginia	Richmond	Grand Lodge of Virginia	1778	311	26,564	CGMNA
Virginia	Richmond	Prince Hall Grand Lodge of Virginia	1877	208	10,865	PHCGM, PHA
Washington	University Place	Grand Lodge of Washington	1858	189	10,252	CGMNA
Washington	Seattle	Prince Hall Grand Lodge of Washington	1903	60	2,958	PHCGM, PHA
West Virginia	Charleston	Grand Lodge of West Virginia	1865	139	15,500	CGMNA
West Virginia	n/a	Prince Hall Grand Lodge of West Virginia	1881	11	592	PHCGM, PHA
Wisconsin	Dousman	Grand Lodge of Wisconsin	1843	183	8,178	CGMNA
Wisconsin	Milwaukee	Prince Hall Grand Lodge of Wisconsin	1952	11	650	PHCGM, PHA
Wyoming	Cheyenne	Grand Lodge of Wyoming	1874	44	2,260	CGMNA

== Grand Lodges affiliated with CLIPSAS ==
CLIPSAS member jurisdictions reject James Anderson's constitutions, do not require belief in a supreme being, and make no distinction regarding participation by men or women. Grand Lodges in the United States affiliated with the Centre de Liaison et d'Information des Puissances maçonniques Signataires de l'Appel de Strasbourg, which was formed in 1961, include:

State	Headquarters City	Name	Founded	Lodges	Members	Affiliations
District of Columbia	Washington	George Washington Union	1976	5	37	SIMPA
Utah	Salt Lake City	International Masonic Order DELPHI of USA	2005	5	59	CATENA, SIMPA, UMM

== Grand Lodges affiliated with the General Grand Masonic Congress ==
The General Grand Masonic Congress claims lineages from the National Grand Lodge, and claims a reorganization date on August 9, 1889 as its founding. It was created by John George Jones, an African American lawyer who was ultimately expelled from the Most Worshipful Prince Hall Grand Lodge of Illinois in 1904. The General Grand Masonic Congress reports lodges in 20 states, including the following Grand Lodges:

State	Headquarters City	Name	Founded	Lodges
California	Los Angeles and Oakland	Hiram of Tyre Grand Lodge	1910	2
Louisiana	Shreveport	Universal Grand Lodge of Louisiana	1922	82
Maryland	Baltimore	Hiram Grand Lodge State of Maryland	1924	1

== Grand Lodges affiliated with International Freemasons ==
The International Masons were founded and incorporated in Dover, Delaware in 1950 and as of 2025, report a presence in 38 states and Puerto Rico. There is a documented presence of 32 lodges in 2 states. The headquarters is located in Detroit, Michigan. The following Grand Lodges are members:

State	Headquarters City	Name	Founded	Lodges
Georgia	Riverdale	Jeff Long Grand Lodge	1980	17
New York	New York City, Manhattan, Harlem	Rose of Sharon Grand Lodge	1950	15

== Grand Lodges affiliated with National Grand Lodge Prince Hall Origin ==
Grand Lodges affiliated with the National Grand Lodge Prince Hall Origin, which was founded in 1847. In 2012, it was reported that the organization consisted of approximately 300 lodges in 27 states with around 5,000 members. At that time it had no fixed location for its national headquarters:

State	Headquarters City	Name	Founded	Lodges	Members
Florida	Gainsville	Meridian Grand Lodge	1980	6	
Georgia	Lithonia	Smooth Ashlar Grand Lodge	1892	52	
Maryland	Baltimore	Maryland Grand Lodge	1926	1	
Mississippi	Moss Point	Prince Hall Grand Lodge	1889	5	45
South Carolina	West Columbia	Palmetto Grand Lodge	1869	51	
Texas	n/a	MW St John Union Grand Lodge		3	

== Unaffiliated Grand Lodges ==
The following grand lodges are unaffilaited with any of the organizations above, have a physical presence, but in all cases consist of a single lodge building.

State	Location	Name	Founded	Notes
California	Los Angeles	St. Anthony Grand Lodge of California of Oakland and Los Angeles	1946	
Colorado	Larkspur	Universal Co-Masonry	1907/1994	
Louisiana	New Orleans	United Most Worshipful St. John's Grand Lodge	2011	
Massachusetts	Dorchester	George Washington Carver Grand Lodge	1945	
New Jersey	Irvington	Garden State Grand Lodge		
New Jersey	Newark	Oriental Grand Lodge A. F. & A. M. of New Jersey		
New York	New York City, Queens	Hiram Grand Lodge	1908	

== See also ==
- List of Masonic Grand Lodges in North America
- History of Masonic Grand Lodges in North America
