= History of Masonic Grand Lodges in North America =

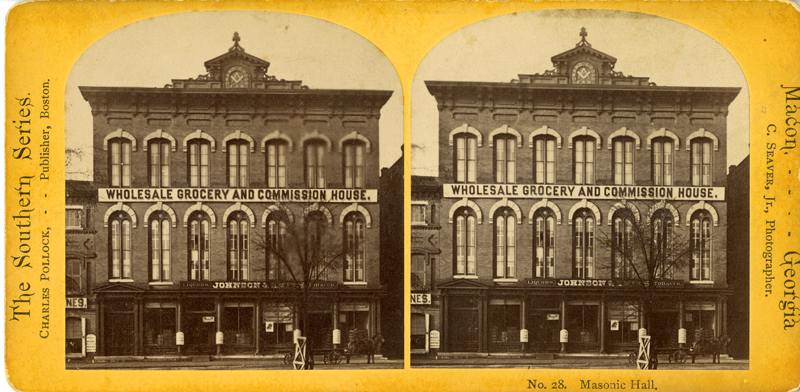
Masonic Hall, Grand Lodge F.A.M., Macon, Georgia 1876

This is a chronology of the formation of "regular" or "mainstream" Masonic Grand Lodges in North America, descending from the Premier Grand Lodge of England or its rival, the Antient Grand Lodge of England. A Grand Lodge (or "Grand Orient" as it is called in some jurisdictions elsewhere in the world) is the governing body that supervises "Craft" Freemasonry (also known as "Blue Lodge" Freemasonry) in a particular jurisdiction or geographical area.

== "Original" Grand Lodges formed by "Time Immemorial" lodges ==
The following Grand Lodges were formed by pre-existing "Time Immemorial" lodges (lodges that predated the concept of having Grand Lodges to supervise and coordinate the craft, and thus were retained as having existed from "time immemorial").

- Premier Grand Lodge of England - est. June 24, 1717 - (Merged with Ancient Grand Lodge of England, or "The Ancients", to form the United Grand Lodge of England in 1813)
- (Republic of Ireland) Grand Lodge of Ireland - est. June 24, 1725
- Grand Lodge of Scotland - est. 1736
- Ancient Grand Lodge of England - est. 1751 - (Merged with Premier Grand Lodge of England, or "The Moderns", to form the United Grand Lodge of England in 1813)

== Grand Lodges founded during the Colonial Era ==
Freemasonry spread from the British Isles during the Colonial Era. All of the "original" Grand Lodges began to issue charters to individual lodges in North America, but the two English Grand Lodges (the "Ancients" and the "Moderns") were the most prolific. Starting in 1730 The Grand Lodge of England (Moderns) began to issue Warrants for Provincial Grand Lodges in the colonies. Initially, these Warrants were issued to individuals, to act as deputies for the Grand Master in a given area for fixed periods of time, and some confusion resulted due to overlapping jurisdictions. To confuse matters further, with the formation of the Antient Grand Lodge, rival Provincial Grand Lodges were chartered under their jurisdiction.

- (United Kingdom) "Coxe" Provincial Grand Lodge of Pennsylvania, New Jersey, & New York (Moderns) - Est. 1730 - by warrant issued to Daniel Coxe by GLE for two years, allowing for a successor to be elected. Granted jurisdiction over Pennsylvania, New Jersey, and New York. Successors claimed jurisdiction only over Pennsylvania. The Grand Lodge of Pennsylvania dates itself from the formation of this Provincial Grand Lodge.
- (United Kingdom) Provincial Grand Lodge of New England (Moderns) - Est. 1733 by warrant given to Henry Price. The Grand Lodge of Massachusetts dates itself from the formation of this Provincial Grand Lodge.
- (United Kingdom) Provincial Grand Lodge of South Carolina - Est. 1736
- (United Kingdom) Provincial Grand Lodge of North Carolina - (Moderns) Est. 1771 - Warrant issued by GLE to Col. Joseph Montfort (1771-1776) and then his Deputy, Cornelius Harnett (1776-1781)
- (United Kingdom) Provincial Grand Lodge of New York (Moderns) - 1738-1780s - Warrants issued by GLE (Moderns) to Francis Goelet (1738–1753), to George Harrison (1753–1771), to Sir John Johnson (from 1771). As Johnson was a Loyalist during the American Revolution, he is believed to have taken his warrant with him when he fled to Canada, thus leaving the Moderns Lodges without a Provincial Grand Master.
- (United Kingdom) Provincial Grand Lodge for North America (Scotland) - Est. 1757 - By warrant issued to Colonel John Young.
- (United Kingdom) Provincial Grand Lodge of Canada - Est. 1759 (Became PGL of Lower Canada, i.e. Quebec, in 1792)
- (United Kingdom) Provincial Grand Lodge for Pennsylvania (Ancients) - Est. 1761 - By Warrant issued to William Ball.
- (United Kingdom) Provincial Grand Lodge of New York ("Athol Charter" - Ancients) - 1781-1784 - Although this PGL was Warranted by the "Ancients", the final Provincial Grand Master, Chancellor Robert R. Livingston (PGM: 1784-87), was actually the Master of a Lodge under the Jurisdiction of the Moderns, thus uniting the two branches of English Freemasonry in New York State. Livingston continued in office as the first Grand Master of the independent GL of NY.
- (United Kingdom) Provincial Grand Lodge of Upper Canada - Est. 1792

== Independent Grand Lodges ==
After the American Revolution and, again, after the incorporation of Canada, the various Provincial Grand Lodges in North America were closed, and the Lodges in each State or Province formed independent Grand Lodges. These in turn, chartered lodges in the territories in the West and North. As each new State or Province came into being, the lodges that had been chartered within its borders gathered together and formed new Grand Lodges.

- Grand Lodge of Virginia - Est. 1778
- (New York (state)) Grand Lodge of New York - Est. 1782 (declared itself Independent Grand Lodge on June 6, 1787)
- Grand Lodge of Pennsylvania - Est. 1786 (Continuation of "Coxe" Prov. G.L. & Prov. G.L. of Penna. See above.)
- (Georgia (U.S. state)) Grand Lodge of Georgia - Est. December 16, 1786
- Grand Lodge of New Jersey - Est. December 18, 1786
- Grand Lodge of Maryland - Est. December 9, 1787
- Grand Lodge of North Carolina - Est. December 9, 1787
- Grand Lodge of South Carolina - Est. 1788
- Grand Lodge of Connecticut - Est. 1789
- Grand Lodge of New Hampshire - Est. 1789
- Grand Lodge of Rhode Island - Est. 1791
- Grand Lodge of Massachusetts - Est. 1792 (continuation of PGL of New England (see above).
- Grand Lodge of Vermont - Est. 1794
- Grand Lodge of Kentucky - Est. 1800
- Grand Lodge of Delaware - Est. 1806
- Grand Lodge of Ohio - Est. 1808
- (United States) Grand Lodge of the District of Columbia - Est. 1811
- Grand Lodge of Louisiana - Est. 1812
- Grand Lodge of Tennessee - Est. 1813
- Grand Lodge of Indiana - Est. January 13, 1818
- Grand Lodge of Mississippi - Est. July 27, 1818
- Grand Lodge of Maine - Est. 1820
- Grand Lodge of Missouri - Est. April 21, 1821
- Grand Lodge of Alabama - Est. June 11, 1821
- Grand Lodge of Michigan - Est. 1826
- Grand Lodge of Florida - Est. 1830
- Grand Lodge of Texas - Est. 1838
- Grand Lodge Of Illinois- Est. 1840 - previous Grand Lodge in existence: 1822-1827
- Grand Lodge of Wisconsin - Est. 1843
- Grand Lodge of Iowa - Est. 1844
- Grand Lodge of California - Est. 1850
- Grand Lodge of Oregon - Est. 1851
- Grand Lodge of Minnesota - Est. 1853
- Grand Lodge of Canada in the Province of Ontario - Est. 1855
- Grand Lodge of Kansas - Est. 1856
- Grand Lodge of Nebraska - Est. 1857
- (Washington (state)) Grand Lodge of Washington State - Est. 1858
- Grand Lodge of Colorado - Est. 1861
- Grand Lodge of Nevada - Est. January 17, 1865
- Grand Lodge of West Virginia - Est. April 12, 1865
- Grand Lodge of Montana - Est. January 24, 1866
- Grand Lodge of Nova Scotia - Est. February 20, 1866
- Grand Lodge of Idaho - Est. December 17, 1867
- Grand Lodge of British Columbia and Yukon - Est. December 24, 1867
- Grand Lodge of New Brunswick - Est. 1868
- Grand Lodge of Quebec - Est. 1869
- Grand Lodge of Utah - Est. 1872
- (United States) Grand Lodge of the Indian Territory - Est. Oct. 6, 1874 (Reestablished in 1892 as Grand Lodge of Oklahoma)
- Grand Lodge of Wyoming - Est. December 15, 1874
- Grand Lodge of Manitoba - Est. May 12, 1875
- Grand Lodge of Prince Edward Island - Est. June 23, 1875
- Grand Lodge of New Mexico - Est. 1877
- Grand Lodge of Arizona - Est. 1882
- Grand Lodge of North Dakota - Est. 1889
- Grand Lodge of Oklahoma - Est. 1892 (Replaced the Grand Lodge of Indian Territory)
- Grand Lodge of Alberta - Est. 1905
- Grand Lodge of Saskatchewan - Est. August 9, 1906
- Grand Lodge of Alaska Est. 1981
- Grand Lodge of Hawaii Est. 1989
- Grand Lodge of Newfoundland and Labrador - Est. 1997

== See also ==
- List of Masonic Grand Lodges North America
- General list of masonic Grand Lodges
- History of Freemasonry
