= List of Masonic Grand Lodges in Central America and the Caribbean =

This is a list of all verifiable organizations that claim to be a Masonic Grand Lodge in the Caribbean.

A Masonic "Grand Lodge" (or sometimes "Grand Orient") is the governing body that supervises the individual "Lodges of Freemasons" in a particular geographical area, known as its "jurisdiction" (usually corresponding to a sovereign state or other major geopolitical unit). Some are large, with thousands of members divided into hundreds of subordinate lodges, while others are tiny, with only a few members split between a handful of local lodges. Sometimes there will only be one Grand Lodge in a given area, but the majority of the time there will be at least two. More often, there will be several competing Grand Lodges claiming the same jurisdictional area, or claiming overlapping areas. This fact leads to debates over legitimacy: Not all Grand Lodges and Grand Orients recognize each other as being legitimate. However, such recognition is not relevant to this list, yet recognition is foundational within the fraternal order. Inclusion in this list only requires the establishment of a physical (as opposed to a virtual, or online) presence, and lodges (regular, unrecognized or clandestine) which acknowledge their governance.

Membership numbers are subject to change; for current figures, check the sources which are indicated in the reference section.

== List of Grand Lodges ==
Country or greater geographical area	Name	Founded	Lodges	Members	Notes
Bahamas	Prince Hall Grand Lodge, Commonwealth of the Bahamas	1950	28		PHCGM, PHA
Belize	Most Worshipful Grand Lodge of Belize (Grand Lodge of Belize)	2012	6	65	
Caribbean Islands	Prince Hall Grand Lodge of the Caribbean	1993	10		PHCGM, PHA
Costa Rica	Gran Logia de Costa Rica (Grand Lodge of Costa Rica)	1899	14	270	CMI, CMCA
Cuba	Grand Lodge of Cuba (Gran Logia de Cuba)	1859	322	25,108	CMI
Dominican Republic	Grand Lodge of the Dominican Republic (Gran Logia de la República Dominicana, Inc.)	1858	18	375	CMI
El Salvador	Gran Logia Cuscatlán	1912	12	265	CMI / COMACA
El Salvador	Gran Oriente de El Salvador (Grand Orient of El Salvador)	2007	5		CLIPSAS
Guatemala	Gran Logia de Guatemala (Grand Lodge of Guatemala)	1903	32	573	CMI
Haiti	Grand Orient of Haiti (Grand Orient d'Haiti)	1824	50	10,000	CMI
Honduras	Gran Logia de Honduras (Grand Lodge of Honduras)	1922	11	250	CMI / COMACA
Nicaragua	Gran Logia Simbólica de Nicaragua (Grand Symbolic Lodge of Nicaragua)	1922	11	170	CMI / CMCA
Panama	Grand Lodge of Massachusetts, lodges in Panama	1906	4	4	A unit of the GL of MA, CGMNA
Panama	Gran Logia de Panamá (Grand Lodge of Panama)	1916	21	434	CMI
Puerto Rico	Grand Lodge of Puerto Rico (Gran Logia Soberana de Puerto Rico)	1885	67	2,700	CMI Grand Lodge in Barrio Obrero, San Juan, Puerto Rico

== See also ==
- List of Masonic Grand Lodges
