= List of Masonic Grand Lodges in Mexico =

This is a list of all verifiable organizations that claim to be a Masonic Grand Lodge in Mexico.

A Masonic "Grand Lodge" (or sometimes "Grand Orient") is the governing body that supervises the individual "Lodges of Freemasons" in a particular geographical area, known as its "jurisdiction" (usually corresponding to a sovereign state or other major geopolitical unit). Some are large, with thousands of members divided into hundreds of subordinate lodges, while others are tiny, with only a few members split between a handful of local lodges. Sometimes there will only be one Grand Lodge in a given area, but the majority of the time there will be at least two. More often, there will be several competing Grand Lodges claiming the same jurisdictional area, or claiming overlapping areas. This fact leads to debates over legitimacy: Not all Grand Lodges and Grand Orients recognize each other as being legitimate. However, such recognition is not relevant to this list, yet recognition is foundational within the fraternal order. Inclusion in this list only requires the establishment of a physical (as opposed to a virtual, or online) presence, and lodges (regular, unrecognized or clandestine) which acknowledge their governance.

Membership numbers are subject to change; for current figures, check the sources which are indicated in the reference section.

== Mexico ==
Country or greater geographical area	State, province, or other geographical area	Name	Founded	Lodges	Members	Notes
Mexico		Gran Logia Valle de Mexico	1862	263	16,977	CMI
Mexico		Most Worshipful York Grand Lodge of Mexico, F.&A.M	1862	18	376	CGMNA
Mexico	Aguascalientes	Gran Logia “Edmundo Games Orozco” del Estado de Aguascalientes (Grand Lodge of the State of Aguascalientes, “Edmundo Games Orozco”)	1998	8		CGLREU
Mexico	Baja California	Gran Logia de Estado de Baja California (Grand Lodge of Baja California)	1933	34	550	CGLREU
Mexico	Baja California Sur	Gran Logia de Estado de Baja California Sur (Grand Lodge of Southern Baja California)	1978	123	210	CGLREU
Mexico	Campeche	Gran Logia del Estado de Campeche (Grand Lodge of the State of Campeche)	1928	19		CMI, CGLREU
Mexico	Chiapas	Gran Logia del Estado de Chiapas (Grand Lodge of the State of Chiapas)	1933	12		CMI, CGLREU
Mexico	Chihuahua	Gran Cosmos Asociación Civil del Rito Escocés Antiguo y Acceptado del Estado de Chihuahua (Grand Civil Association Cosmos of the Scottish Rite, State of Chihuahua)	1990			
Mexico	Chihuahua	Gran Logia "Cosmos" del Estado de Chihuahua (Grand Lodge of the State of Chihuahua, "Cosmos")	1883	30		CMI, CGLREU
Mexico	Ciudad de México	Gran Logia de la Ciudad de México (Grand Lodge of Mexico City)	2010	12		
Mexico	Coahuila	Gran Logia "Benito Juarez" del Estado de Coahuila (Grand Lodge of the State of Coahuila, "Benito Juarez")	1890	24	284	CGLREU
Mexico	Colima	Gran Logia “Sur Oeste” del Estado de Colima (Grand Lodge of the State of Colima, “Southwest”)	1937	24		CGLREU
Mexico	Durango	Gran Logia "Guadalupe Victoria" del Estado de Durango (Grand Lodge of the State of Durango, "Guadalupe Victoria")	1923	12	250	CMI, CGLREU
Mexico	Estado de México	Gran Logia del Estado de México (Grand Lodge of Estate of Mexico)	1997	18		CGLREU
Mexico	Guanajuato	Gran Logia del Estado de Guanajuato (Grand Lodge of the State of Guanajuato)	1996	10		CMI, CGLREU
Mexico	Guerrero	Gran Logia del Estado de Guerrero (Grand Lodge of the State of Guerrero)	1999	17		CGLREU
Mexico	Hildalgo	Gran Logia del Estado de Hidalgo de AA:.LL:.AA:.MM:. del R:.E:.A:.A:.(Grand Lodge of the State of Hidalgo)	1940	20		CMI, CGLREU
Mexico	Jalisco	Gran Logia "Occidental Mexicana" (Grand Lodge of Western Mexico, in the State of Jalisco)	1912	25	520	CGLREU
Mexico	Michoacán	Gran Logia “Lázaro Cárdenas” del Estado de Michoacán (Grand Lodge of the State of Michoacán, “Lázaro Cárdenas”)	1969	40		CGLREU
Mexico	Morelos	Gran Logia “Soberana e Independiente” del Estado de Morelos (Grand Lodge of the State of Morelos, “Sovereign and Independent”)	1997	13		CGLREU
Mexico	Nayarit	Gran Logia del Estado de Nayarit (Grand Lodge of the State of Nayarit)	1954	8		CGLREU
Mexico	Nuevo León	Gran Logia de Nuevo León (Grand Lodge of Nuevo León)	1905	77	1,714	CMI, CGLREU
Mexico	Oaxaca	Gran Logia “Benito Juárez García” del Estado de Oaxaca (Grand Lodge of the State of Oaxaca, “Benito Juárez García”)	1885	22		CMI, CGLREU
Mexico	Puebla	Gran Logia “Benemérito Ejército de Oriente” del Estado de Puebla (Grand Lodge of the State of Puebla, “Distinguished Army of the East”)	1996	15		CGLREU
Mexico	Querétaro	Gran Logia del Estado de Querétaro (Grand Lodge of the State of Querétaro)	1924	14		CMI, CGLREU
Mexico	Quintana Roo	Gran Logia del Estado “Andrés Quintana Roo” (Grand Lodge of the State "Andrés Quintana Roo")	1980	32	659	CMI, CGLREU: Recognized by the Grand Lodges of the CGMNA: North Carolina, Massachusetts, Illinois, Texas, California, New York, Maryland, Florida, Virginia, Puerto Rico.
Mexico	San Luis Potosí	Gran Logia de Estado Soberana e Independiente "El Potosi" (Grand Lodge of the Sovereign and Independent State of "El Potosi")	1891	13		CMI, CGLREU
Mexico	Sinaloa	Gran Logia del Estado de Sinaloa (Grand Lodge of the State of Sinaloa)	1985	17		CMI, CGLREU
Mexico	Sonora	Gran Logia del Pacifico (Grand Lodge of the Pacific)	1923	19		CMI, CGLREU
Mexico	Tabasco	Gran Logia “Restauración” del Estado de Tabasco (Grand Lodge of the State of Tabasco, "Restoration")	1923	38		CMI, CGLREU
Mexico	Tamaulipas	Gran Logia del Estado de Tamaulipas (Grand Lodge of the State of Tamaulipas)	1909	94	2,278	CMI, CGLREU
Mexico	Veracruz	Gran Logia "Unida Mexicana" de Veracruz (Grand Lodge of Veracruz, "United Mexico")	1885 (1869)	70	1,800	CMI, CGLREU
Mexico	Yucatán	Gran Logia “La Oriental Penínsular” del Estado de Yucatán (Grand Lodge of the State of Yucatán, "Eastern Peninsula")	1928 (1883)	9		CGLREU
Mexico	Zacatecas	Gran Logia “Jesús González Ortega” del Estado de Zacatecas (Grand Lodge of the State of Zacatecas, “Jesús González Ortega” )	1994	17		

== See also ==
- List of Masonic Grand Lodges North America
