= Grand Lodge of Cyprus =

- Seal of the Grand Lodge of Cyprus; A.F. & A.M.
- Established: 2006
- Location: Republic of Cyprus
- Website: Grand Lodge of Cyprus website (Greek language)

The Grand Lodge of Cyprus, or in the Greek language, Μεγάλη Στοά της Κύπρου, is the sovereign governing body of freemasonry within the Republic of Cyprus. Its formal English name is "The Most Worshipful Grand Lodge of Cyprus, Ancient Free and Accepted Masons." While four of its constituent lodges are approaching 100 years of age, the Grand Lodge of Cyprus itself came into being on February 15, 2006. Thus it is one of the youngest grand lodges in the world.

The Grand Lodge of Cyprus is recognized internationally as the sovereign masonic authority of the Republic of Cyprus, which, in turn, is the sole state on the island recognized by both the United Nations and the European Union. The Grand Lodge of Cyprus was derived from originally Greek chartered lodges but now works in at least four languages, including Greek, English, German and Italian. Another group, now in amity with the Grand Lodge of Cypress, is the District Grand Lodge of Cyprus, a unit of the United Grand Lodge of England and subordinate to the UGLE. Lodges of this District operate in English to serve mainly British citizens living on military bases or elsewhere on the island: Cyprus is a Commonwealth nation, and besides these military bases is a favored Mediterranean holiday and retirement destination for citizens of the UK.

In July 1974, Turkey invaded Cyprus and since then, approximately 33% of the republic's territory is under their military occupation, essentially the northern peninsula. Even though the jurisdiction of the Grand Lodge of Cyprus covers the entire territory of the Republic, sufficient control cannot be exercised by them over the occupied areas due to the current status quo.

Hence, any masonic lodge operating in the occupied areas of the Republic of Cyprus is doing so without the authorization of the Grand Lodge of Cyprus; intervisitation from lodges belonging to the Grand Lodge of Cyprus is not permitted.

Lodges operating under the auspices of the Grand Lodge of Cyprus may be found throughout the non-occupied area of the island, including in Nicosia, Larnaca, Famagusta, Limassol and Pafos.

== History ==
=== Freemasonry in Cyprus ===
Freemasonry in Cyprus may be traced back well into the Ottoman era over 200 years ago. Historical records place freemasons in the Larnaca district, where at that time all consulates were located. Coastal Larnaca was then considered the capital, and is a main port of the island. This is documented by the presence of graves bearing Masonic marks in the enclosure of the Church of Ayios Lazarus, also by the 1751 handwritten manuscript of Petrakis Karydes, and by an 1815 circular against Masons, written by the Archbishop of Cyprus, Kyprianos. It is believed that lodge meetings were held whenever there were sufficient brethren visiting as officers or passengers of ships in port to augment the Masons of the island. However, since Cyprus was then under Ottoman occupation, and even though there were Cypriot Masons who had joined the craft while studying abroad, it was not possible to create permanent lodges.

This period was marked by several competing claims for ownership of this much-trafficked and much-contested land. Control by the fraying Ottoman Empire ended when Cyprus was leased by the British Empire, with its administration beginning in 1878.

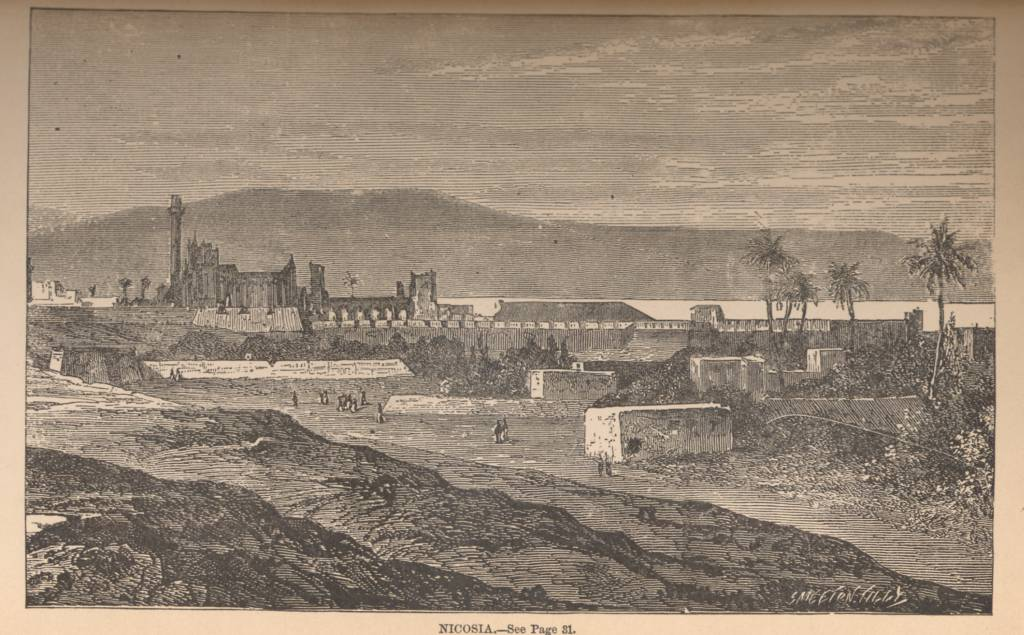
Nicosia in 1878, the year the British first began their administration of Cyprus, and just ten years before the first lodges were formed.

In 1888, ten years after the British occupation of Cyprus, the United Grand Lodge of England established its first lodge in Cyprus, St. Paul Lodge number 2277, which is the mother of all lodges in Cyprus. The Grand Lodge of Greece followed in 1895 with Zenon Lodge number 18. ^{[a]} Politically, Britain formally annexed Cyprus as a Crown Colony in 1925. Thirty five years later, on 16 August 1960, Cyprus attained independence and recognition by the UN, with the allowance of two independently administered military bases that remained under British control. As positive as this milestone seemed, independence has not been easy.

British colonial policies had promoted ethnic polarization. The British had applied the principle of "divide and rule", setting the two groups against each other to prevent combined action against colonial rule. Newly independent, these native factions vied for control. Cyprus' newly formed government attempted to mollify the demands of the restive and even combative native Cypriot parties, most of which were influenced by external meddling from either the Turkish government, the British, the US, or by Greece. (At the time, Greece was controlled by a coup with its own designs on the island.) After a tumultuous 14 years, two separate invasions were sponsored by the Turkish government in 1974, a land grab ostensibly aimed at protecting the 18.3% of the population that was ethnically Turkish. US and British threats ended the incursion, but not before large amounts of territory were seized in the north of the island.

Various peace initiatives have been studied over the years, with non-aggression assured by the presence of UN observers in the fenced border between the two sides. Meanwhile, despite Article 49 of the Fourth Geneva Convention, which prohibits an occupier from transferring or deporting parts of its own civilian population into an occupied territory, Turkey has systematically settled in excess of 100,000 of its citizens into the sparsely populated north, increasing the ratio of Turkish citizens living on the island. The situation remains peaceful, but watchful, awaiting a final resolution of the conflict.

Masonic control is not directly exercised in the Turkish Republic of North Cyprus (which declared itself an independent country in 1983) by the Grand Lodge of Cyprus, however, some Masons who are members of the Grand Lodge of Cyprus live in the TRNC. Moreover, the Grand Lodge of Turkey has three lodges in the TRNC. Today, the northern 37% of its land mass is the TRNC which is NOT recognized internationally except by the Republic of Turkey, 2-3% is controlled by the UN or leased by Britain's two military bases, and 59% remains under the authority of the Republic of Cyprus.

International Masonic protocol allows three or more regular Masonic lodges in every sovereign state the right to form a Grand Lodge, under which it would operate all willing lodges in its territory. Many of England's former colonies have seen formation of their own grand lodges, while by Masonic treaty still accepting lodges of earlier jurisdictions such as England, Ireland or Scotland. Shared territorial jurisdiction is allowable by mutual agreement.

Although the Republic of Cyprus was established in 1960, the Masons of Cyprus, for many reasons, primarily an emotional attachment to the existing control of their lodges by the Greek Grand Lodge, did not immediately move to form their own grand lodge. After several attempts, the Cypriots Masons, on 4 December 2005, eventually met in General Assembly and made the historic decision of establishing their own Grand Lodge of Cyprus, by an overwhelming majority.

=== Founding of the Grand Lodge of Cyprus ===
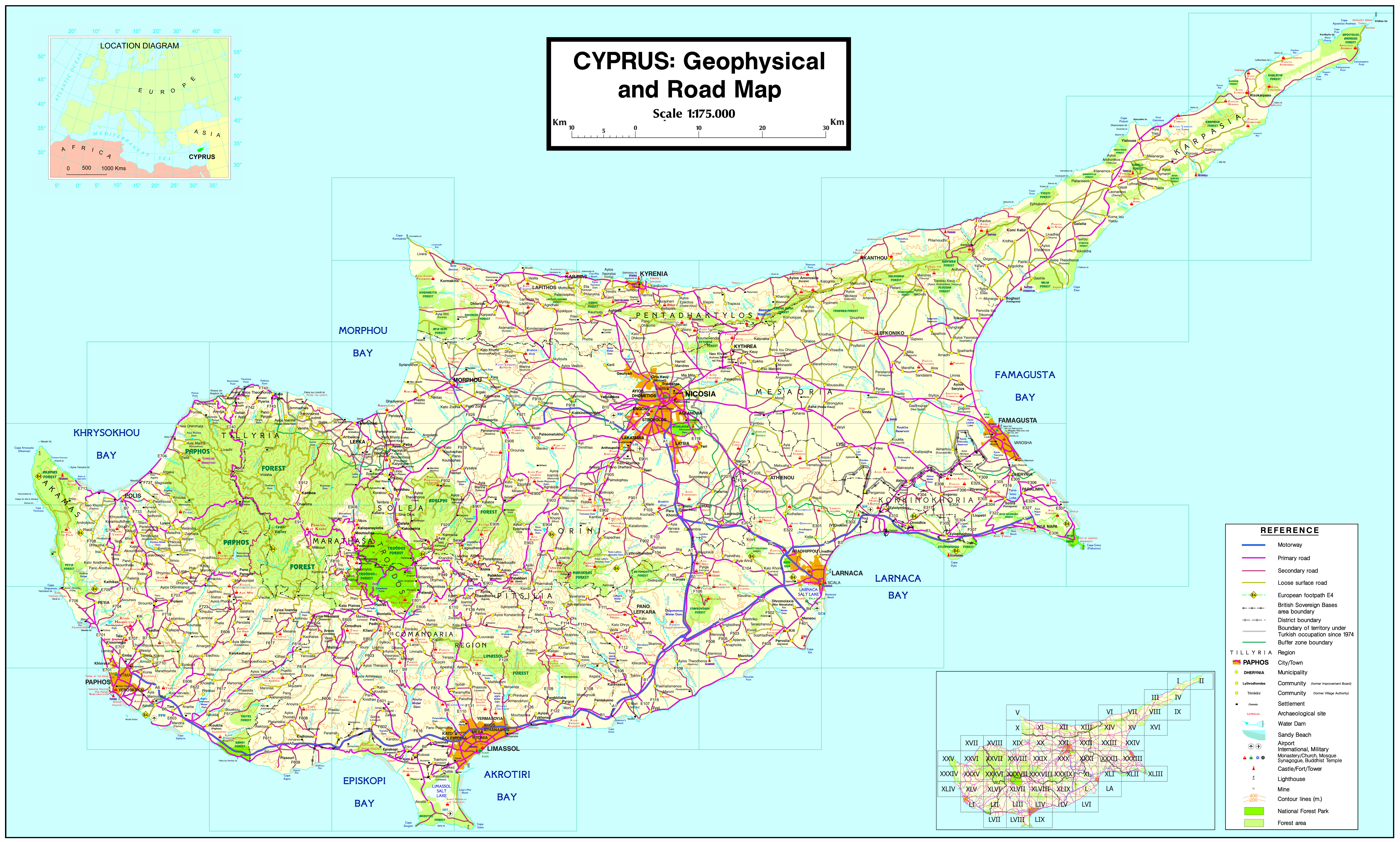
A map showing the main roads and cities of Cyprus

Founding members were the following Lodges, which until then, were under the auspices and constitution of the Grand Lodge of Greece:

- ΚΙΜΩΝ or "KIMON", in Larnaca, founded in 1918
- ΣΟΛΩΝ or "SOLON" in Nicosia, founded in 1921
- ΚΙΝΥΡΑΣ or "KINYRAS" in Paphos, founded in 1923
- ΕΥΑΓΟΡΑΣ or "EVAGORAS" in Famagusta, founded in 1928 and removed to Limassol in 1974
- ΑΔΟΝΙΣ or "ADONIS" in Nicosia, founded in 1961
- ΚΟΙΝΟΝ ΚΥΠΡΙΩΝ or "KINON KYPRION", Nicosia, founded in 1977

ΖΗΝΩΝ ("ZENON") Lodge of Limassol remained under the jurisdiction of the Grand Lodge of Greece, and PHOENIX of Nicosia opted to join the District Grand Lodge of Cyprus, organized in the 1980s as a unit of the United Grand Lodge of England, rather than the newly-forming Grand Lodge of Cyprus.

On 15 January 2006, the Grand Lodge of Cyprus held its first organizing meeting and elections, during which the following members were elected to become the first Grand Council:

- Grand Master - M∴ W∴ Bro. Iacovos Vorkas
- Deputy Grand Master - R∴ W∴ Bro. Andreas Assiotis
- Grand Senior Warden - R∴ W∴ Bro. Panayiotis M. Joannou
- Grand Junior Warden - R∴ W∴ Bro. Savvas Pilacoutas
- also as Grand Junior Warden - R∴ W∴ Bro. Harutune Arakelian
- Grand Treasurer - R∴ W∴ Bro. Kyriakos Neocleous
- Grand Almoner - R∴ W∴ Bro. Antonis Neofytou
- Grand Director of Ceremonies - R∴ W∴ Bro. Athanasios Papadopoulos
- Grand Deacon - R∴ W∴ Bro. Panayiotis Vavlitis
- Grand Inner Guard - R∴ W∴ Bro. Christodoulos Kyperoundas

Note that there have been several regular elections held since 2006, each ushering in several new grand officers.

As of the 28th of May, 2022 with the unanimous decision of its members, ΖΗΝΩΝ ("ZENON") Lodge of Limassol joined the Grand Lodge of Cyprus.

=== Consecration ===
The Grand Lodge of Cyprus was legally constituted and founded by the Grand Lodge of Greece, the Grand Lodge of Austria, and the Grand Lodge of Pennsylvania on October 8, 2006. Members of the following jurisdictions were also present for the ceremony:

=== Significant Events Since Founding ===
==== Steady Growth ====
The Grand Lodge of Cyprus has experienced steady growth since its founding, a trend that has increased with the expansion of recognition by other international bodies of freemasons and with 2010's normalization of relations with the United Grand Lodge of England and with their District Grand Lodge of Cyprus. The Grand Lodge of Cyprus is now made up of 14 lodges. In addition to Greek, specific lodges conduct their meetings in English, German, Italian, or other languages as noted:

- ΚΙΜΩΝ or "KIMON" #1, Larnaca, Founding lodge of the Grand Lodge of Cyprus
- ΣΟΛΩΝ or "SOLON" #2, Nicosia, Founding lodge of the Grand Lodge of Cyprus
- ΚΙΝΥΡΑΣ or "KINYRAS" #3, Paphos, Founding lodge of the Grand Lodge of Cyprus
- ΕΥΑΓΟΡΑΣ or "EVAGORAS" #4, Limassol, Founding lodge of the Grand Lodge of Cyprus
- ΑΔΟΝΙΣ or "ADONIS" #5, Nicosia, Founding lodge of the Grand Lodge of Cyprus
- ΚΟΙΝΟΝ ΚΥΠΡΙΩΝ or "KINON KYPRION" #6, Nicosia, Founding lodge of the Grand Lodge of Cyprus
- "GOETHE" #7, in Larnaca, German speaking
- "GIUSEPPE GARIBALDI" #8, Nicosia, Italian speaking
- "ACROPOLIS AMATHUSIA" #9, Limassol
- "HIRAM ABIF" #10, Nicosia
- "SALINA" #11, Larnaca, English speaking
- "STRICT OBSERVANCE 'Old 73' " #12, Limassol, English Speaking
- "ST. ANDREWS" #13, Limassol, English Speaking
- "PERSEAS" #14, Nicosia, English Speaking
- "UNITY" #15, Limassol
- ΖΗΝΩΝ or "ZENON" #18, Limassol

==== Celebrations and International Conferences ====
The Fifth Anniversary of the founding of the Grand Lodge of Cyprus was celebrated with a meeting and banquet for members and guests in Nicosia on 5–6 November 2011.

A scholarly symposium on freemasonry, the 10th European Masonic Meeting, was held in the city of Paphos on 26–28 October 2012, bringing together 212 freemasons from 14 countries.

== Lodge Halls or Temples ==
The Grand Lodge of Cyprus maintains four lodge halls or temples, at the following locations:

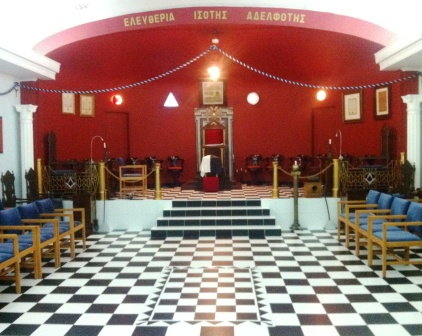
Interior of Larnaca Lodge Hall

Larnaca Lodge Hall The home of KIMON, GOETHE, and SALINA Lodges

Zachariadou 10
Larnaca

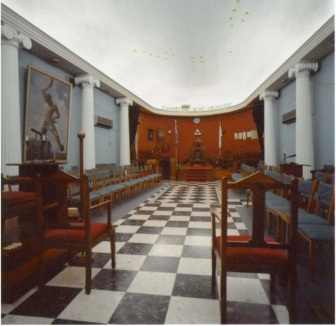
Interior of Nicosia Lodge Hall

Nicosia Lodge Hall (Main Temple) The home of SOLON, ADONIS, KINON KYPRION, GIUSEPPE GARIBALDI, HIRAM ABIF and PERSEUS Lodges

Freemason’s Hall – Main Temple
Onasagorou Street 59A, 1011 Nicosia

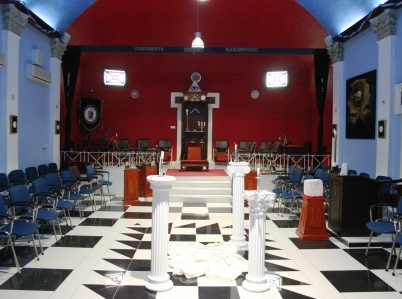
Interior of Paphos Lodge Hall

Paphos Lodge Hall The home of KINYRAS Lodge

Ermou 5
Paphos

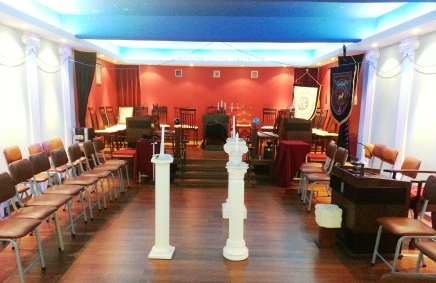
Interior of Limassol Lodge Hall

Limassol Lodge Hall The home of EVAGORAS, ACROPOLIS AMATHUSIA, STRICT OBEDIENCE '73', ST. ANDREWS, and UNITY Lodges

Vasileos Constantinou 62
Limassol

== Shared Masonic Control ==
The Grand Lodge of Cyprus shares control, or jurisdiction over Masonic activity in Cyprus due to the historical and continuing presence of the United Grand Lodge of England’s District Grand Lodge of Cyprus, formed in 1980, which serves Freemasons from the UK’s twin military bases on Cyprus and other British citizens and English speakers residing there. In the north three lodges with charters granted by the Grand Lodge of Turkey operate, but are only recognized by the Turkish grand lodge. A treaty of full amity was reached by the Grand Lodge of Cyprus with the UGLE, defining terms of mutual recognition, free intervisitation and good will and was ratified by the UGLE on June 6, 2010.

=== Recognition Among Worldwide Freemasonry ===
Now widely recognized among international freemasonry, the Grand Lodge of Cyprus holds mutual recognition treaties with over 140 of the world's Masonic grand jurisdictions, as of the end of 2012. Such agreements exist in the form of letters or patents that proclaim that, as of a certain date, freemasons from one jurisdiction may visit and attend lodge meetings or other Masonic functions in another. These agreements are reciprocal, and foster the cherished Masonic principle of intervisitation. Within freemasonry, such decisions about amity are made as sovereign determinations. Without such treaties Masonic law and custom prohibits interaction on a Masonic level, which is also known as communicating Masonically.

For the purpose of this section and for brevity, formal names of jurisdictions are sometimes shortened. Therefore, "The Grand Lodge of Cyprus" is rendered as "Cyprus," and other jurisdictional names may be similarly shortened.

The achievement of such broad recognition did not come easily for the Grand Lodge of Cyprus.

Shortly after its Consecration, the new Cypriot Grand Lodge wrote letters seeking recognition by the other grand lodges of the world. While the jurisdiction was legally formed by the older and broadly recognized jurisdictions of Greece, Austria and Pennsylvania, and complied with the commonly accepted standards of recognition requirements, the co-existing District Grand Lodge of Cyprus ("District GL") was unwilling to accept a rival jurisdiction on the island. It claimed a similarly long pedigree on the island, dating from 1888; its members were made up largely of British military or ex-pat British who had moved to Cyprus at retirement, many of these transferring their lodge memberships from England proper to its District GL in Cyprus. Their lodges and district structure were stable, as a unit of the United Grand Lodge of England (UGLE), and District GL leadership was unwilling to embark on shared jurisdiction, fearing a threat to the status quo, and possible decrease in interest in the District GL's own lodges. Although many freemasons from both sides maintained friendships with members of the other group, District GL leadership advised London that any treaty of amity was ill-advised. The District GL's parent, the United Grand Lodge of England, demurred to the wishes of local District leadership in this matter. This brought Cyprus' efforts to gain recognition around the world to a standstill, because, as one of the three premier, or first, grand lodges of the world (with Ireland and Scotland), UGLE's acceptance or denial of recognition is seen as a bellwether among Masonic jurisdictions. Hence, even with the founding endorsement of three respected grand lodge 'parents', many jurisdictions chose to hold off taking any action on Cyprus' request.

A loose organization of North American grand lodges, the "Conference of Grand Masters in North America" ("COGMNA" website) sponsors a sub-committee, called the Commission on Recognition ("Commission"). This Commission works as a study group on behalf of the 64 member organizations of COGMNA on matters of recognition, and its recommendations work similarly as a bellwether to help North American grand lodges determine their independent courses of action on recognition requests. The Commission takes special care to determine adherence to several points of legitimacy, including that of exclusivity of territory claimed by each jurisdiction. In the case of Cyprus, the Commission followed the lead of UGLE, and in 2007 recommended to its member jurisdictions that "An agreement should be reached within the Grand Lodge of Cyprus that recognizes the rights [of] those Lodges chartered by the United Grand Lodge of England to co-exist within the jurisdiction of Cyprus." This effectively told the new Cypriot grand lodge to find agreement with the rival District grand lodge before the Commission would accept them into amity, with similar polite deferrals coming from the UGLE.

With nothing driving the District GL to seek amity, for over three years this remained the status quo. Cyprus' letters requesting amity were politely declined as rumor spread about a territorial dispute. The District GL was the sole Cypriot masonic body recognized by England, and while a few European grand lodges moved to accept Cyprus, North American grand lodges especially were unwilling to act on the matter out of deference to UGLE. Only two US state jurisdictions had accepted Cyprus: Pennsylvania and Washington. No movement was forthcoming from the others, nor from the Commonwealth grand lodges.

Stimied at every turn, the founding Grand Master of Cyprus, Iakovos (or Jakob) Vorkas, was at a loss for how he might move the situation forward.

=== A Chance Meeting ===
Pursuing his dream of building amity between the Grand Lodge of Cyprus and the other jurisdictions of the Masonic world, Grand Master Iakovos Vorkas traveled to the 275th Anniversary Celebration of the Grand Lodge of Massachusetts, held on 3-6 October 2008 in Boston, Massachusetts. There, his intent was to meet the many visiting delegates from other jurisdictions around the world, and to press his case for recognition of Cyprus. He was frustrated: although the delegates smiled and listened, he could elicit no firm, positive responses to his earnest requests for consideration of the many recognition requests that his grand lodge had issued. On a break after dinner, Vorkas sat outside his hotel for a rest. Another delegate, Thomas C. Jackson, then newly elected as Grand Master of the Grand Lodge of Minnesota, happened to join him at the same bench. (Note: This fraternal leader is not the same 'Tom Jackson' as a now-deceased Pennsylvania Mason who served the World Conference of Grand Masters as its Secretary. The Pennsylvania Mason's name was Thomas W. Jackson, and the Minnesotan's name is Thomas C. Jackson.) ^{[c]}

This chance meeting, which began with the mundane action of Vorkas offering Jackson a cigar as he began to explain his troubles, led to the eventual breakthrough that Vorkas had long worked to achieve. In Jackson's words, from a speech he later gave to the Grand Lodge of Cyprus:

"I met Jakob Vorkas several years ago in Washington DC, at a meeting of grand masters from around the world. The year was 2008. A formal dinner was winding down, and as is my practice, I stepped outside for a breath of fresh air on that cool evening, where I met a small, white-haired man, hunched over a bit from the cold. He offered me a cigar, which I was pleased to accept, and we proceeded to tell each other our stories.

"I learned that in this ancient land, though Masonry had existed here for well over a century, only recently had sponsoring jurisdictions moved to form a new grand lodge. [I learned too], that for various reasons, although well-formed by Greece, Austria and Pennsylvania, very few of the world’s jurisdictions had as yet embraced this new entity. Jakob, your first Grand Master, was sorely troubled. Apparently only two US jurisdictions had stretched out the hand of brotherly love, and the process of earning recognition from the others was at a standstill. We ended up talking well past that single cigar, and a second one each. We met the next evening as well, and I for one was delighted in his company, and moved by his story.

"They say that the softest voice can sometimes carry the most meaning. Jakob, bless his memory, asked me with a tear in his eye to help him, to consider the request he had doubtless sent to my own grand lodge office, and to learn what I could about Cyprus, his grand lodge, and the brethren he had served his entire adult life.

"On that day, I made a promise to an old man, as grand master of my jurisdiction and man of my word, that I would do so."

Jackson investigated Vorkas' claims concerning Cyprus' legitimacy, and the recalcitrance of the UGLE to move on the matter. Jackson confirmed with the Chancellor of the UGLE, R.W. Bro. Alan Englefield, as then-Grand Chancellor and the officer responsible for matters of foreign relations, that the Grand Lodge of Cyprus appeared to the UGLE as fully regular, and that their decision to defer recognition of Cyprus would have no bearing on the independent actions of other jurisdictions. The UGLE saw this as a territorial disagreement that he wished the parties would resolve, but which had nothing to do with Masonic regularity. Englefield offered this advice in the presence of several members of the Commission. With this understanding, Jackson then invited other Masonic leaders among his acquaintance to investigate the matter for themselves. His opinion, shared while endorsing Cyprus, was that freemasons should work to correct wrongs they perceive; that the Cypriot Grand Lodge was worthy of recognition and had been treated unfairly and with little recourse, echoing the political turmoil that had wrested this island from occupier to occupier to occupier. The Grand Lodge of Cyprus had done everything right, and now needed the aid of the other grand lodges in the world.

This personalized activism led numerous North American jurisdictions to take positive action to recognize Cyprus. At the same time, Cypriot leaders such as MWB Vorkas, his Deputy Grand Master Panayiotis Joannou, and Grand Secretary Constantinos Agrotis, continued their diligent work to build masonic relationships around the globe. Jackson became an ally in their struggle.

=== The Breakthrough At Last ===
Two years later, at the 2010 annual meeting of COGMNA and the Commission on Recognition, with 20 US jurisdictions now recognizing Cyprus, Jackson assisted new Cypriot Grand Master Panayiotis Joannou to press the English grand lodge for a new decision on Cyprus. The Chancellor of UGLE, to his lasting credit, agreed to look into the matter, moved perhaps by Joannou's carefully worded letter pledging that English Constitution lodges would be welcomed to remain as a part of the fabric of Cypriot freemasonry if UGLE were to recognize the Grand Lodge of Cyprus. This letter had the effect of nullifying the key objection that the District Grand Lodge had regarding recognition of the home grown grand lodge. Joannou and Jackson both spoke before the COGMNA Commission on behalf of Cyprus and together, drafted a request that the Commission provide much-needed clarity for the North American grand lodges on this thus-far intractable situation.

Shortly after the COGNMA meeting, the Chancellor of the UGLE made good on his promise and, with Joannou, worked out over a series of letters a definitive agreement on amity between the two jurisdictions. This letter was ratified at the Quarterly Communication of the UGLE on 6 June 2010. Responding to this letter, the COGMNA Commission published an update to their 2010 report and, at Jackson's request, an even clearer follow-up in 2011, noting that the UGLE and the Grand Lodge of Cyprus had entered into a treaty of amity, paving the way for many North American jurisdictions to take positive action toward the Grand Lodge of Cyprus. Quoting the Commission's website: The United Grand Lodge of England and the Grand Lodge of Cyprus have reached an accord whereby they will both share the jurisdiction of Cyprus, and have established fraternal relations among themselves. The Grand Lodge of Cyprus therefore now meets all the standards for recognition. With this action, and the grant of recognition by other influential jurisdictions such as Ireland, Scotland and the Netherlands, as of the end of 2013, over 140 regular jurisdictions, including the following national, state or provincial grand lodges, now recognize the Grand Lodge of Cyprus:

==== European & Middle Eastern Recognition of Cyprus ====
Albania; Andorra; Armenia; Austria; Azerbaijan (National); Belgium (Regular); Bulgaria (United); Croatia; Czech Republic; Denmark; England; Estonia; Finland; France (National); Germany; Greece; Hungary (Symbolic); Iran (in Exile, meeting in Massachusetts and California); Ireland; Israel; Italy (Grand Orient); Latvia; Lithuania; Luxembourg; Malta; Moldova; Monaco; Montenegro; Netherlands; Norway; Poland; Portugal (Legal); Romania (National); Russia; San Marino; Scotland; Serbia (Regular); Slovakia; Slovenia; Spain; Sweden; Switzerland (Alpina); and Ukraine

==== Jurisdictions in the U.S. that recognize Cyprus ====
Alabama; Alaska; Arkansas; California; Colorado; Connecticut; Delaware; District of Columbia; Florida; Georgia; Hawaii; Idaho; Illinois; Indiana; Iowa; Kansas; Kentucky; Louisiana; Maine; Maryland; Massachusetts; Michigan; Minnesota; Mississippi; Missouri; Montana; Nebraska; Nevada; New Hampshire; New Jersey; New Mexico; New York; North Carolina; North Dakota; Ohio; Oklahoma; Oregon; Pennsylvania; Rhode Island; South Carolina; South Dakota; Tennessee; Texas; Utah; Vermont; Virginia; Washington; West Virginia; Wisconsin; Wyoming; Prince Hall Grand Lodge of Alaska; Prince Hall Grand Lodge of Colorado and Jurisdiction; Prince Hall Grand Lodge of Missouri and Jurisdiction; Prince Hall Grand Lodge of Nevada and Jurisdiction; Prince Hall Grand Lodge of New Mexico; Prince Hall Grand Lodge of North Carolina; Prince Hall Grand Lodge of Pennsylvania; Prince Hall Grand Lodge of Virginia

==== Canadian Jurisdictions that Recognize Cyprus ====
All - Alberta; British Columbia and Yukon; Manitoba; New Brunswick; Newfoundland & Labrador; Nova Scotia; Ontario; Prince Edward Island; Quebec; Saskatchewan;

==== Pacific Zone & Australian Recognition of Cyprus ====
Australia: Queensland (United); South Australia and Northern Territories; Tasmania; Victoria; Western Australia; China (reconstituted in Taipei); India; Japan; Tahiti (Regular);

==== African & Indian Ocean Zone Recognition of Cyprus ====
Gabon; Ivory Coast; Madagascar (National); Mauritius; Morocco (Regular); South Africa; Togo (National)

==== Latin & South American Recognition of Cyprus ====
Argentina; Bolivia; Brazil (Grande Oriente); Brazil (Bahia); Brazil (Ceara); Brazil (Espirito Santo); Brazil (Goias); Brazil (Minas Gerais); Brazil (Rio Grande do Norte); Brazil (Rio Grande do Sul); Brazil (Santa Catarina); Brazil (São Paulo); Brazil (Sergipe); Chile; Colombia (Cartagena); Colombia (Oriental); Dominican Republic; Guatemala; Mexico (Baja California); Mexico (Cosmos); Mexico (Unita Mexicana); Panama; Peru; Puerto Rico; Uruguay

=== Recognition Information ===
The Grand Lodge of Cyprus remains amenable to recognition by any regularly constituted grand lodge in the world. The Grand Lodge of Cyprus fulfills the commonly accepted standards of recognition requirements used by Masonic grand lodges of: Legitimacy of Origin; Adherence to the Ancient Landmarks, specifically an unalterable and continuing belief in God, the volume of the Sacred Law as an indispensable part of the furniture of the Lodge, and the prohibition of the discussion of religion and politics.

== Charitable and Educational Programs ==
The Grand Lodge of Cyprus serves members, their families and all of Cyprus with Charitable and Educational programming. These include blood drives, scholarships and educational events.

Economic pressure and a resulting recession caused by the EU-required seizure of depositor assets on the island in 2013 has inspired numerous acts of charity between lodge members and externally to the local communities near Grand Lodge of Cyprus lodge halls.

== Current Statistics, Officers and Contact Information ==
The Grand Lodge of Cyprus has 15 Lodges, and a roster of over 500 members.
The Grand Lodge of Cyprus has lodges working in Greek, German, Italian and English, and has stated an intention to establish lodges working in Armenian and Turkish in the near future.
The Grand Lodge of Cyprus permits Dual Membership out of the State, (that is, external to its own lodges) only, which may be granted upon permission by the Grand Master. Plural Membership in the State, (that is, in two or more of its lodges), is not permitted.
The Annual Communication (~Meeting) of the Grand Lodge of Cyprus is held at the end of January or early February.
Appendant Bodies present in Cyprus which operate in harmony with the Grand Lodge of Cyprus include the Scottish Rite and the Red Cross of Constantine,

=== Current Grand Officers ===
Grand Master: M∴ W∴ Bro. Chrysanthos K. Chrysanthis (#2)
Deputy Grand Master: R∴ W∴ Bro. Michalis G. Agathos (#4)
Senior Grand Warden: R∴ W∴ Bro. Xenophon A. Solomonides (#1)
Junior Grand Warden: R∴ W∴ Bro. Aristotelis A. Komodromos (#1)
Grand Secretary: R∴ W∴ Bro. Andreas C. Asprou (#2)
Grand Treasurer: R∴ W∴ Bro. Pantelis G. Evangelou (#3)
Grand Almoner: R∴ W∴ Bro. Nikolaos G. Sarlis (#3)
Grand Chancellor of Foreign Affairs: M∴ W∴ Bro. Andreas Chr. Charalambous, IPGM (#3)
Grand Orator: R∴ W∴ Bro. George M. Kalopedis (#5)
Grand Director of Ceremonies: R∴ W∴ Bro. Ioannis K. Trochidis (#2)
Grand Deacon: R∴ W∴ Bro. Costas O. Lambrou (#3)
Grand Inner Guard: R∴ W∴ Bro. Christos N. Tsoundas (#6)
Grand Sword Bearer: R∴ W∴ Bro. Marios A. Couvas (#9)

The foregoing officers were duly elected on 29 Jan 2023 and installed for the period 2023-2026 AD.

=== Past Grand Masters ===
- M∴ W∴ Bro. Iakovos (Jakob) Vorkas (deceased)
- M∴ W∴ Bro. Panayiotis M. Joannou
- M∴ W∴ Bro. Petros S. Machalepis
- M∴ W∴ Bro. Andreas Chr. Charalambous

=== Contact Information ===
Street Address
Grand Secretary, Freemasons Hall
59A Onasagorou Street
1011 Nicosia – Cyprus

- or -

Postal Address
Grand Secretary, Freemasons Hall
P. O. Box 21791
1513 Nicosia – Cyprus
Website: http://grandlodgeofcyprus.com/

== Notes ==
- a. Many records relating to the formation of Cypriot lodges by the Grand Lodge of Greece were routinely transferred back to the headquarters of that Grand Lodge for archiving. Regrettably, these were all destroyed (burned) by the Nazis during WWII during the occupation of Greece and the suppression of Masonic activity there.
- b. For further information about The Invasion, please see the Talk page.
- c. The two "Tom Jacksons" were further intertwined, relative to Cyprus. Both are writers and speakers. Thomas W. Jackson had been deeply involved in global Masonry, and played an active role in the 2006 Consecration of the Grand Lodge of Cyprus by virtue of his status as the Grand Secretary of the World Conference of Grand Masters. At the time he was Past Grand Secretary of the Grand Lodge of Pennsylvania, one of the three sponsoring lodges that formed the Grand Lodge of Cyprus. Thus "Thomas W." was well known in international Masonic work at this writing. His younger but unrelated counterpart, Thomas C. Jackson began his work as a strong advocate for Cyprus in 2008, while he was Grand Master of the Grand Lodge of Minnesota, and is known for his US lodge revitalization efforts. Until the death of the Pennsylvanian in December of 2021, the two men were friends, and often found their hotel reservations bobbled because of the similarity of their names when they had met frequently at various Masonic meetings around the world.
