= List of Masonic Grand Lodges in North America =

This is a list of all verifiable organizations that claim to be a Masonic Grand Lodge in North America. A Masonic "Grand Lodge" (or sometimes "Grand Orient") is the governing body that supervises the individual "Lodges of Freemasons" in a particular geographical area, known as its "jurisdiction" (usually corresponding to a sovereign state or other major geopolitical unit). Some are large, with thousands of members divided into hundreds of subordinate lodges, while others are tiny, with only a few members split between a handful of local lodges. Sometimes there will only be one Grand Lodge in a given area, but the majority of the time there will be at least two. More often, there will be several competing Grand Lodges claiming the same jurisdictional area, or claiming overlapping areas. This fact leads to debates over legitimacy: Not all Grand Lodges and Grand Orients recognize each other as being legitimate. However, such recognition is not relevant to this list, yet recognition is foundational within the fraternal order. Inclusion in this list only requires the establishment of a physical (as opposed to a virtual, or online) presence, and lodges (regular, unrecognized or clandestine) which acknowledge their governance.

Membership numbers are subject to change; for current figures, check the sources which are indicated in the reference section.

== See also ==
- History of Masonic Grand Lodges in North America
- List of Masonic Grand Lodges
