= Freemasonry in Montenegro =

The Freemasonry in Montenegro (Montenegrin: Slobodno zidarstvo u Crnoj Gori) is becoming more and more numerous, and as a result, their influence on all parts of social life is growing. Although the work of the Montenegrin masons has become more transparent than it was before, it is difficult to know the exact number of those who are in the fraternity. However, according to Dnevne Novine research, there are almost 400 masons in Montenegro.

== Lodges active in Montenegro ==
The Grand Lodge of Montenegro has jurisdiction over 6 Montenegrin masonic lodges with around 400 members. The Grand Master is Božo Šibalić.

There are 5 lodges under its protection:

- Montenegro (Podgorica)
- Zora (Kotor)
- Luča Mikrokozma (Cetinje)
- Garibaldi (Nikšić)
- Evropa
