= Freemasonry in Ukraine =

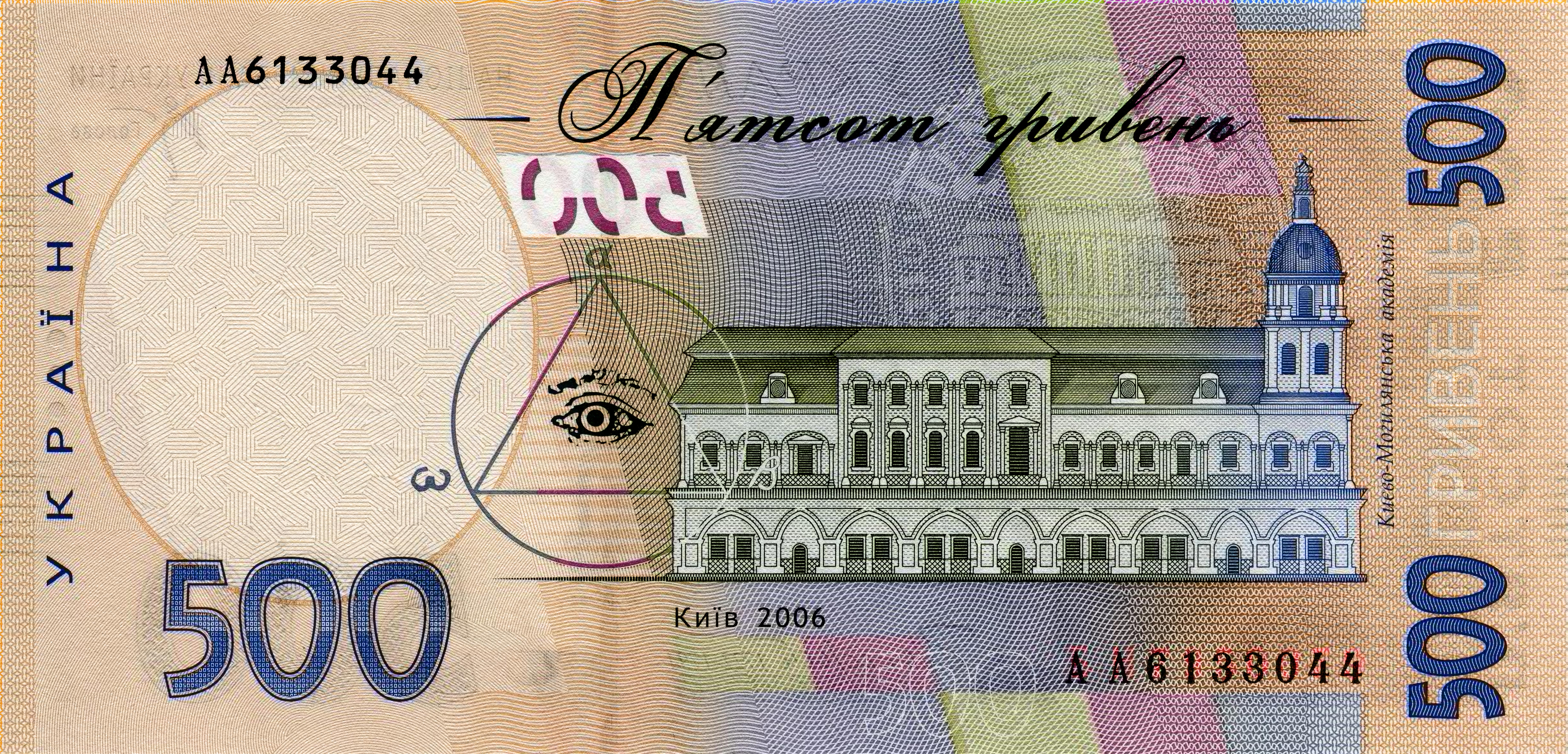
Eye of Providence on the Ukrainian hryvnia

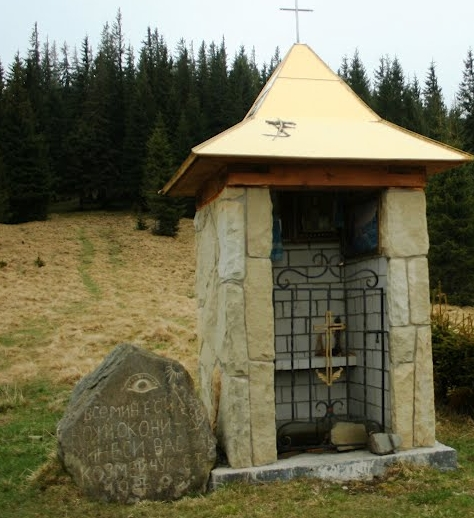
Near a village of Mykulychyn, the rock inscription reads: "All will pass but God eye does not pass you."

Freemasonry in Ukraine (Ukrainian: Вільне мулярство, Вільне каменярство) has appeared sometime in the mid 18th century when the first lodges were created on its territory at that time within the Polish–Lithuanian Commonwealth.

== Development of the freemasonry movement ==
On a record the first lodge of Three Brothers was created in the village of Vyshnivka in Volhynia in 1742 by Polish noblemen. In Lviv the first lodge of Three Goddesses appeared in 1758 (part of Austro-Hungary).

The first lodge in Malorossiya (Russian Empire) was established in Kyiv in 1784 by Russian officers. One of the members of that lodge which was named Bessmertie was Hryhoriy Skovoroda. The lodge was created eventually after the first Partition of Poland. The next year 1784 three lodges have appeared in Kremenchuk: Mars, Dobry Pastyr, and Minerva. The last one Minerva was transferred to the Dnieper banks from the city of Podolie Nemyriv. It is known that freemasonry existed in Kharkiv, Vinnytsia, Yekaterinoslav, Berdichev, others. Later (1780-90s) couple lodges existed in each of the following cities Dubno, Kremenchuk, Zhytomyr, and Kyiv (Bessmertie and Tri kolonny). (Tri kolonny was recreated in 1993.) In the 19th century the popularity of them only increased throughout Ukraine and Crimea.

In the Sloboda Ukraine existed a lodge "Palitsynska Akademia". The "Malorusian Secret Brotherhood" that was created by V.Lukashevych and sought the independence of Ukraine also was connected with freemasonry movement that continued to spread rapidly. In Kharkiv the most famous was the lodge "Umirayushchiy Sfinks" (Dying Sphinx) that was created sometime after 1764 when Kharkiv was visited by a Moscow University professor Viganda.

In 1822 Aleksandr I issued an order prohibiting freemasonry and it seemed that it will stop, however, the movement since then simply went underground.

== See also ==
- Brotherhood of Saints Cyril and Methodius
