= Grand Lodge of Colombia =

Grand Lodge in Colombia

Coordinates: 11°00′40.55″N 74°50′06.78″W

The Grand Lodge of Colombia (or National Grand Lodge of Colombia in Barranquilla) is a regular masonic obedience with a territorial jurisdiction corresponding to the department (state) of Atlántico, Colombia.

== History ==
Founded in 1918, it is the oldest symbolic Grand Lodge of the Republic of Colombia. In such departments, it is the only regular masonic obedience and the only Grand Lodge officially recognized by the United Grand Lodge of England (UGLE) and the regular masonic bodies of the world, including the United States Grand Lodges and the many Grand Lodges of Latin America and Europe.

== Location ==
The National Grand Lodge of Colombia Based in Barranquilla and its Main Temple (including a couple of smaller temples under the same building) is located in the west of Barranquilla in the neighborhood called "Villa Santos", Colombia. 11° 0'40.55"N 74°50'6.78"W.
