= Grand Lodge of North Dakota =

- Seal of the Grand Lodge of North Dakota
- Formation: 1889
- Location: North Dakota, United States
- Region served: North Dakota
- Website: www.ndmasons.com

The Grand Lodge of North Dakota, formally known as the Grand Lodge of Ancient, Free & Accepted Masons of North Dakota, is the governing body of the largest group of masonic lodges in North Dakota. It follows the Anglo-American tradition of Freemasonry common in the United States.

== Early history ==
The first known Mason to arrive in what would eventually become North Dakota was Meriwether Lewis, a member of Saint Louis Lodge No. 111 of Missouri.

The first lodge in Dakota was created by the Grand Master of the Grand Lodge of Iowa on April 27, 1862, when Thomas H. Benton Jr., Grand Master, issued a dispensation to T. J. Dewitt; A. G. Fuller; M. R. Luse, and seven others to open Dakota Lodge at Fort Randall.

Dakota Lodge's dispensation was apparently not renewed, but by 1875 the Grand Lodge of Iowa had chartered six more lodges in Dakota: Saint John's Lodge No. 166 at Yankton, Incense Lodge No. 257 at Vermillion, Elk Point Lodge No. 288, Minnehaha Lodge No. 328 at Sioux Falls, Silver Star Lodge No. 345 at Canton, and Mount Zion Lodge No. 346 at Springfield. All of these lodges were located in what eventually became South Dakota. In the northern part of the territory, meanwhile, the Grand Lodge of Minnesota had chartered two lodges: Shiloh Lodge No. 105 at Fargo and Bismarck Lodge U.D. The Grand Lodge of Minnesota also chartered the Yellowstone Lodge No. 88 at Fort Buford in NW North Dakota. The site was active from January 1871 to June 1874. The Yellowstone Lodge occupied the first Masonic hall in what became North Dakota.

On June 22, 1875 five of these lodges (Saint John's, Incense, Elk Point, Minnehaha, and Silver Star) convened at Elk Point and voted to form a grand lodge. The next day the convention adopted a constitution and code of by-laws and elected T. H. Brown as the first Grand Master. Later that day, after the remaining necessary business was concluded, the brethren adjourned to the Baptist church where the officers of the Grand Lodge of Dakota were installed by Theodore S. Parvin, Past Grand Master of Iowa.

The Grand Lodge was constituted in due and ancient form; the procession [then] returned to the hall of Incense Lodge and the officers of the Grand Lodge entered upon the discharge of their respective duties.

Mount Zion, Shiloh, and Bismarck did not participate. This created - or revealed - a difficulty with regard to Shiloh and Bismarck, they having been chartered by the Grand Lodge of Minnesota instead of Iowa, but things were eventually worked out and those two lodges soon came into the fold, along with Mount Zion.

Lodges began to grow in the north as well as in the south. On June 9, 1880, the Grand Lodge issued charters to a number of lodges, among them Pembina Lodge No. 10, Casselton Lodge No. 12, and Acacia Lodge No. 15, at Grand Forks.

On June 11, 1889, at the 15th annual session of the Grand Lodge of Dakota, the Grand Master reported that Congress was preparing to divide the territory and create the states of North and South Dakota. The Grand Master appointed a committee to study the matter. The committee met and reported back immediately with the following suggestion:

Resolved, That in response to the unanimously expressed desire of the representatives from the lodges existing in Dakota north of the seventh standard parallel, this Grand Lodge does hereby accord to the representatives from what is known as North Dakota, with fraternal regard and kind wishes, full, free, and cordial consent to withdraw from this Grand Lodge for the purpose of organizing a Grand Lodge, to be known as the "Grand Lodge of North Dakota, A.F. & A.M.," to occupy and hold exclusive Masonic jurisdiction in all that portion of Dakota north of the seventh standard parallel.

There were 73 lodges at the time in southern Dakota and 26 in the north. The committee took an inventory of Grand Lodge property, "was pleased to state that their work [had] been characterized by the most perfect harmony and good feeling," and proposed a proportional division of the property, based on the number of lodges, between the new Grand Lodge of North Dakota and the Grand Lodge of Dakota, which was to continue under a new name as the Grand Lodge of South Dakota.

The North Dakota lodges, having met and held elections on June 12, they were then installed, George V. Ayres being the first Grand Master of North Dakota. The Grand Lodge of Dakota presented the officers of the new Grand Lodge of Dakota with jewels of office as a tender and unexpected gift, and the Grand Lodge of Dakota was then closed in ample form and ceased to be on June 13, 1889.

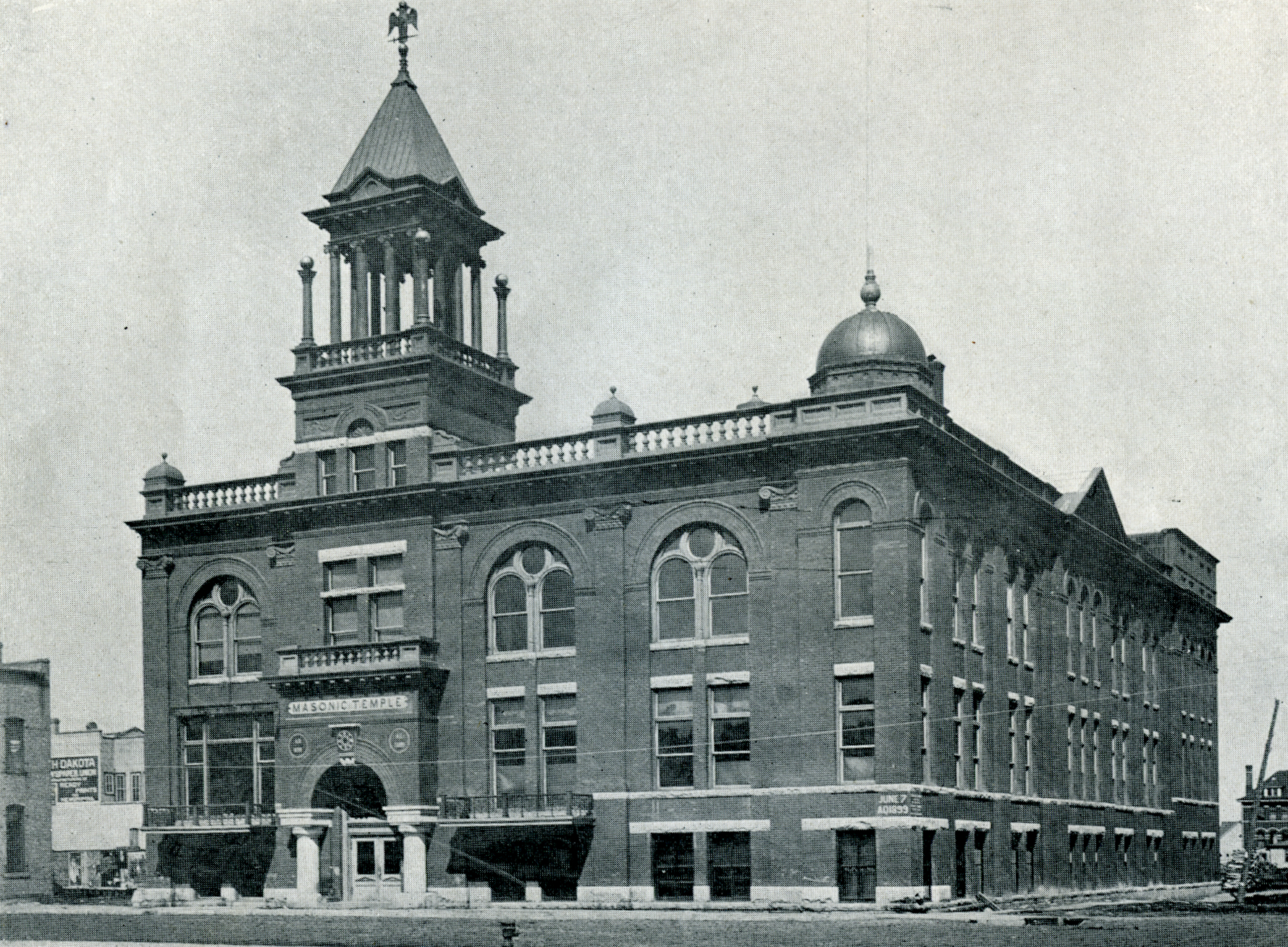
Masonic Temple in Fargo, N.D., circa 1900

The Grand Lodge made, and as of this writing (April, 2017) continues to make, its home at the Fargo Masonic Temple. This building was for many years the most imposing building in the area. Planning for the building began in 1894 when the local masonic organizations started a construction fund.

The cornerstone was laid in 1899 and the building was occupied one year later, in June 1900. The building was faced in Menominee red pressed brick and trimmed in Little Falls granite. It featured over 55,000 square feet of floor space, a banquet all which seated 455 and a two-story, 1,100-seat auditorium. There were lodge rooms, a kitchen, billiard room, library, and offices. In 1902, two years after the building was opened, Maj. Rufus Fleming, who had been a major force in the local Scottish Rite bodies for twenty years, and who was instrumental in the construction of the building, died. He was interred floor of the Scottish Rite room.

In 1959, the El Zagel Shrine moved out of the building and the decreased activity contributed to the decline in the maintenance of the building. Then, in 1968, the building masonic bodies sold the building to the Fargo Parking Authority. Maj. Fleming, was disinterred and reinterred in Sunset Gardens in south Fargo.

== Formation ==
On June 12, 1889, 20 of the 26 lodges from northern Dakota were present at the 15th annual session of the Grand Lodge of Dakota They were: Shiloh No. 8, Pembina No. 10, Cassleton No. 12, Acacia No. 15, Bismarck No. 16, Jamestown No. 19, Valley City No. 21, Cereal No. 29, Hillsboro No. 32, Crescent No. 36, Cheyenne Valley No. 41, Ellendale No. 49, Sanborn No. 51, Mackey No. 63, Hiram No. 74, Minnewaukan No. 75, Tongue River No. 78, Bathgate No. 80, Euclid No. 84, and Golden Valley No. 90.

In their convention held during Grand Lodge, these lodges met and "Resolved, That this convention deem it expedient, and for the good of Masonry, that a Grand Lodge be organized for North Dakota." They adopted a constitution and code of by-laws, elected officers, and then adjourned until 9:00 a.m. the following day, at which time the officers of the Grand Lodge of North Dakota were installed by the officers of the Grand Lodge of Dakota. Installation of the North Dakota officers was apparently the last item of business on the agenda when the Grand Lodge of Dakota - which lived on as the Grand Lodge of South Dakota - closed for the last time.

Fargo Masonic Temple, ca. 1920

At noon on June 13, 1889, an hour which has symbolic importance in masonic ritual, the Grand Lodge of North Dakota met at the hall of Resurgam Lodge No. 31 in Mitchell, South Dakota, and was opened, for the first time, in ample form.

== Prince Hall recognition ==
Prince Hall Masonry in North Dakota falls under the jurisdiction of the Most Worshipful Grand Lodge of Minnesota, Inc., with whom intervisitation was approved in 1991, and then expanded in 1998. The Grand Lodge of North Dakota recognizes several other Prince Hall grand lodges as well.
