= Grand Lodge of Ohio =

US freemasonry governing body

Coordinates: 40.086381°N 83.017899°W

- Seal of the Grand Lodge of Ohio
- Established: 1808
- Location: USA
- Region served: Ohio
- Website: freemason.com

The Grand Lodge of Ohio, formally known as the Grand Lodge of Free & Accepted Masons of Ohio, is the governing body of the largest group of Masonic lodges in Ohio. (The next largest being the Most Worshipful Prince Hall Grand Lodge of Ohio.) The Grand Lodge of Ohio follows the Anglo-American tradition of Freemasonry that is common in the United States. In 2023, the Grand Lodge reported a total membership of 75,000 Master Masons.

== Formation ==
The Grand Lodge of Ohio was formed on January 4–8, 1808 by a convention of five of the six Masonic lodges then meeting in Ohio. The convention was held in the statehouse at Chillicothe and, on January 7, Rufus Putnam was elected Grand Master.

Prior to formation of the Grand Lodge of Ohio, six lodges operated under authority of charters issued by their individual parent grand lodges in the eastern United States:

1. American Union Lodge No. 1 – chartered in 1776 by the Provincial Grand Lodge of New England (Moderns), one of the predecessors of the current Grand Lodge of Massachusetts. Originally a military traveling lodge, it settled permanently in Marietta in June 1790.
2. Cincinnati Lodge No. 13 – chartered in 1806 by the Grand Lodge of Kentucky and located in Cincinnati. Its members had originally formed Nova Caesarea Lodge No. 10, chartered by the Grand Lodge of New Jersey in 1791, which charter they returned to that Grand Lodge previous to requesting a new one from the Grand Lodge of Kentucky.
3. Erie Lodge No. 47 – chartered in 1803 by the Grand Lodge of Connecticut and located in Warren.
4. New England Lodge No. 48 – chartered in 1803 by the Grand Lodge of Connecticut and located in Worthington.
5. Lodge of Amity No. 105 – chartered in 1805 by the Grand Lodge of Pennsylvania and located in Zanesville.
6. Scioto Lodge No. 2 – chartered in 1805 by the Grand Lodge of Massachusetts and located in Chillicothe.

Erie Lodge was the driving force behind the formation of the Grand Lodge, and proposed the idea to the other lodges in the state. Due to a dispute over the credentials of its representative, James Kilbourne, New England Lodge was not present at the convention but is considered a founding lodge nevertheless.

The Grand Lodge of Ohio has been in continual existence since 1808 and as of May, 2023 had over 430 chartered lodges and more than 64,000 members.

== Prince Hall recognition ==
On December 4, 1994, Steven Reece, Grand Master of The Most Worshipful Prince Hall Grand Lodge of Ohio, formally requested recognition of his grand lodge by the Grand Lodge of Free & Accepted Masons of Ohio. The Grand Lodge granted fraternal recognition at its 186th annual session on October 20, 1995. The agreement between the two grand lodges states:

In recognition of the fact that both Grand Lodges are regular in origin and legitimate in nature, now therefore be it resolved that: It is mutually agreed by The Most Worshipful Grand Lodge of Free and Accepted Masons of Ohio and The Most Worshipful Prince Hall Grand Lodge of Free and Accepted Masons of Ohio, Inc. on this 20th day of October, 1995, that we dwell together in peace and harmony, and each do hereafter fraternally recognize the other as legitimate proponents of Brotherly Love, Relief and Truth within the state of Ohio and do accord to the other rights of visitation in Grand Lodge and constituent lodges wheresoever assembled, subject to the rights, powers and authority of the Grand Masters and the Masters of the constituent lodges to preside over their respective Grand Lodges and lodges.

The agreement was signed by Steven Reece, Grand Master, and Frederick E. Kelley Sr., Deputy Grand Master of the Most Worshipful Prince Hall Grand Lodge of Ohio as well as James E. Olmstead, Grand Master, and Neil M. Smalley, Deputy Grand Master of the Grand Lodge of Free & Accepted Masons of Ohio.

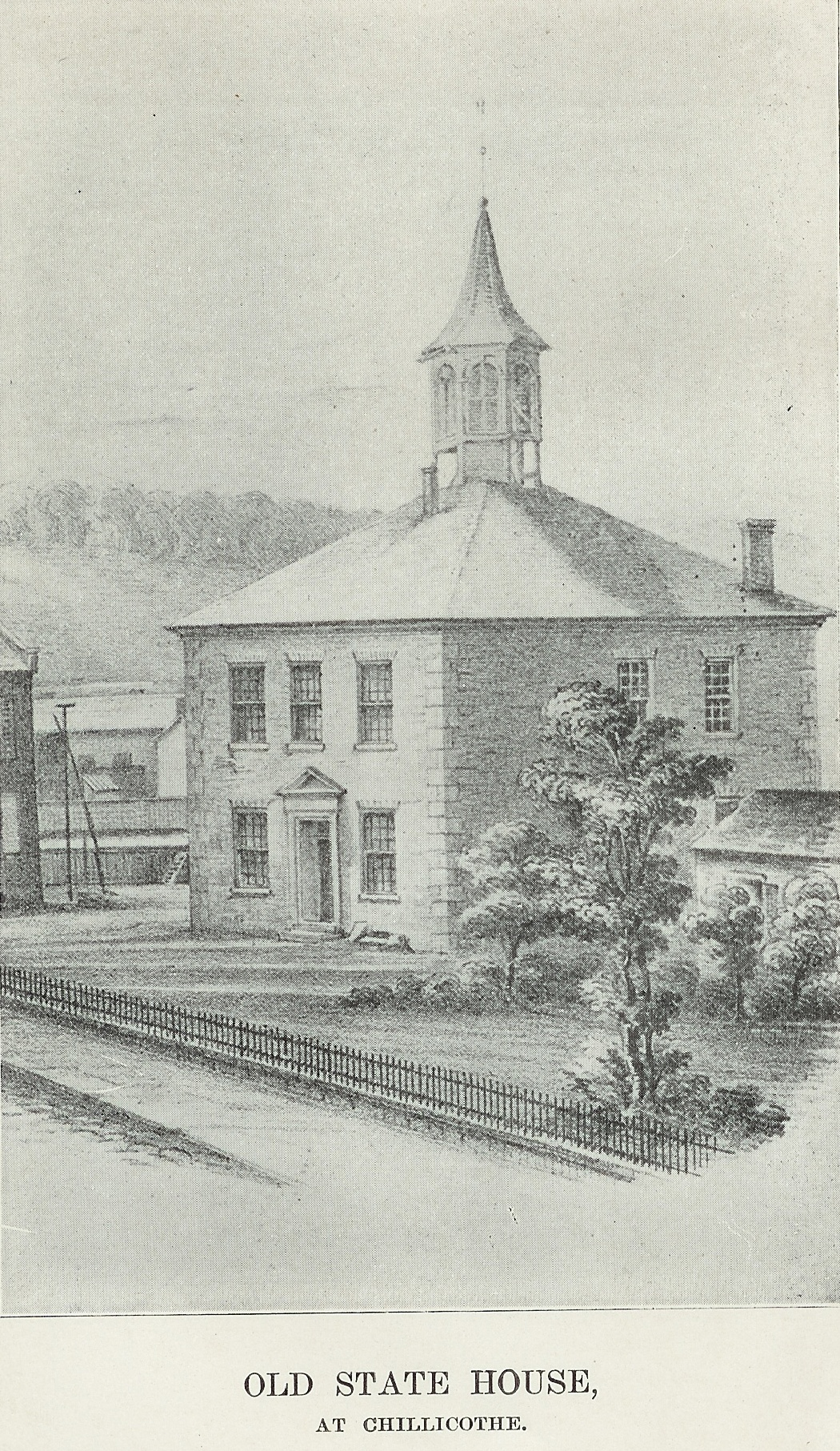
Ohio Statehouse at Chillicothe, 1808

== Officers ==
There are six officers who are elected annually:

- Grand Master
- Deputy Grand Master
- Senior Grand Warden
- Junior Grand Warden
- Grand Treasurer
- Grand Secretary

and six officers who are appointed by the Grand Master:

- Grand Chaplain
- Grand Orator
- Grand Marshal
- Senior Grand Deacon
- Junior Grand Deacon
- Grand Tyler

== Voting membership ==
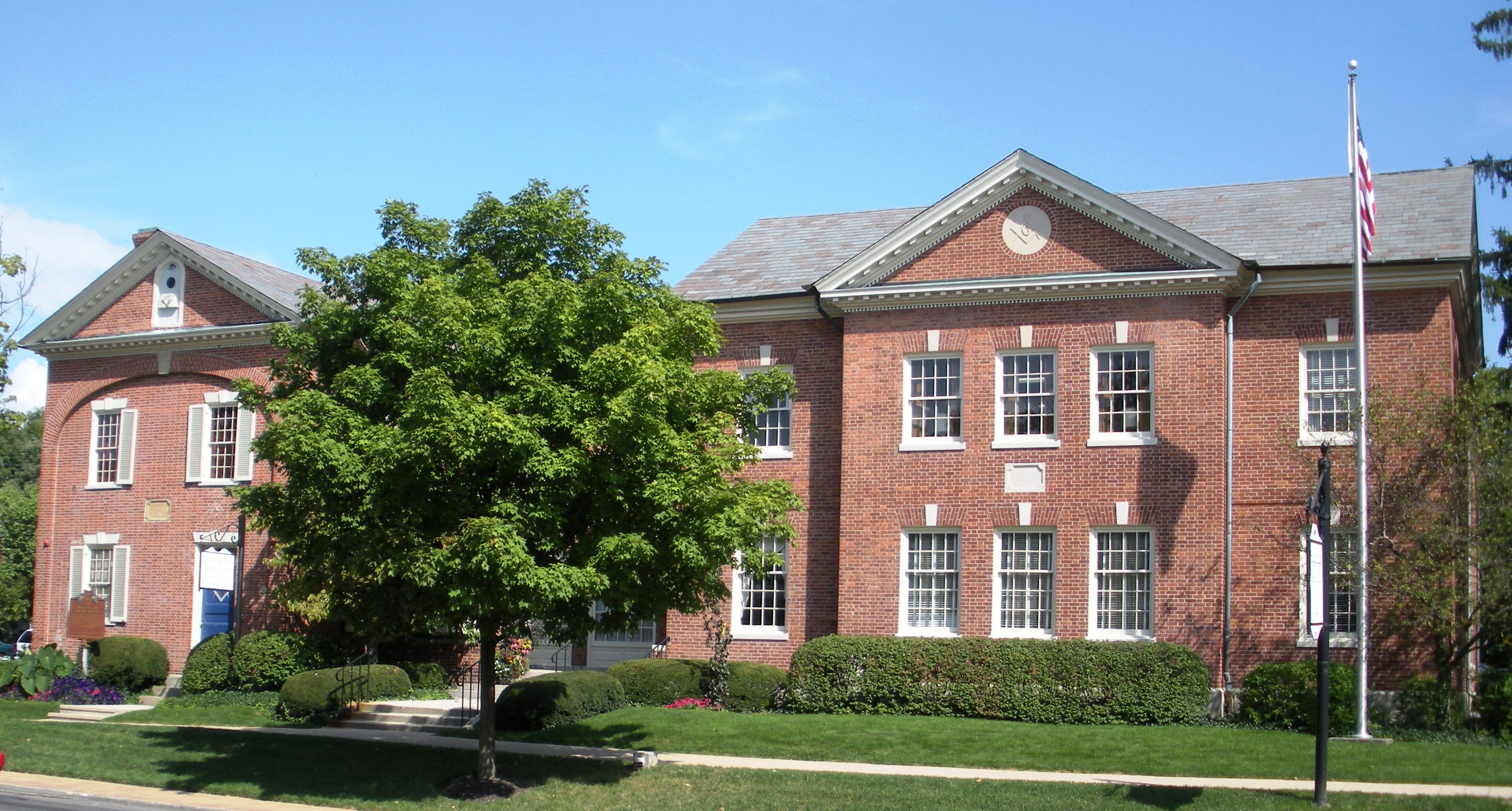
Former Grand Lodge building at Worthington, Ohio

The voting membership of the Grand Lodge consists of its elected and appointed officers, together with the Masters and Wardens of the chartered lodges under its jurisdiction, the District Deputy Grand Masters and District Education Officers during their term of office, and such Past Grand Masters and Past District Deputy Grand Masters as are members of such lodges.

Until 2012, the Grand Lodge's headquarters and museum were located in Worthington, Ohio. The Worthington building was built in 1955 and adjoined the lodge hall built in 1820 by New England Lodge No. 4. The 1820 building is said to be the oldest Masonic lodge hall west of the Appalachian Mountains. In 2012, the Grand Lodge moved its headquarters and museum to the campus of the Ohio Masonic Home in Springfield.
