= Grand Lodge of the Dominican Republic =

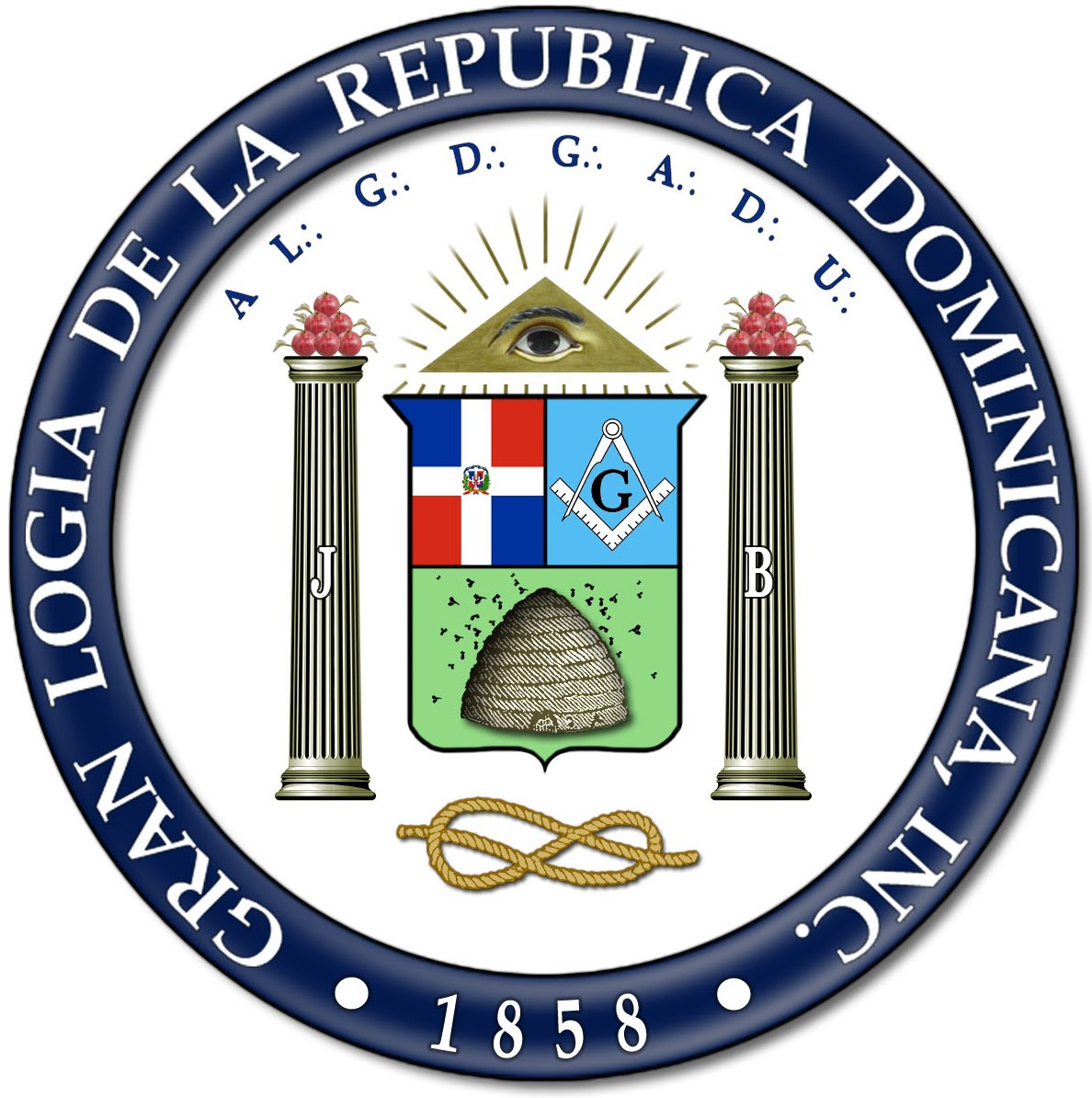
Emblem of the Grand Lodge of the Dominican Republic

The Grand Lodge of the Dominican Republic is a federation of Masonic lodges with jurisdiction in the Dominican Republic. Founded October 24, 1858, it holds relations with the United Grand Lodge of England and is a member of the Inter-American Masonic Confederation (Confederación Masónica Interamericana).
