= Grand Lodge of Manitoba =

The Grand Lodge of Manitoba is the Grand Lodge, or governing body, of the masonic organization in the jurisdiction or Manitoba, Canada. Manitoba contains 54 lodges with 1,873 members. The Grand Lodge was established on 12 May 1875.

== History ==
Freemasonry came to the area in 1813 when John Palmer Bourke, a member of Wellington Persevering Lodge No. 20 in Montreal, settled there. In 1864, several years after Bourke's death, the Northern Light Lodge was formed by John Christian Schultz, A.G.B. Bannatyne and William Inkster. By 12 May 1875, there were three lodges in the region, which joined to form the Grand Lodge of Manitoba. wIts first Grand Master was William C. Clark. At that time, Alberta, Assiniboia, Saskatchewan and the Yukon Territories were all under the jurisdiction of the Grand Lodge. In its first years, the Grand Lodge, which consisted of 200 Freemasons, was challenged by a rift between two rituals, with practitioners divided over the "American", or "Ancient York", ritual and the "English", or "Canadian", work. To resolve these differences, the Grand Lodge of Manitoba recognized both.

The jurisdiction of the Grand Lodge of Manitoba was diminished in 1905 and 1908 with the formation of the Grand Lodges of Alberta and Saskatchewan. The numbers were further reduced in 1907, when two of the Yukon lodges decided to affiliate with the Grand Lodge of British Columbia.

== See also ==
- List of Masonic Grand Lodges in Canada

== Sources ==
- Official site
- History and Development of Freemasonry
- One Hundred Years of Free Masonry in Manitoba
