= Grand Lodge of Minnesota =

US Masonic Lodge

- Logo of the Grand Lodge of Minnesota
- Established: 1853; 173 years ago
- Location: United States
- Region served: Minnesota
- Grand Master: MW Robert S. Davis
- Website: https://mnfreemasons.org

The Grand Lodge of Minnesota, formally known as "The Most Worshipful Grand Lodge, Ancient Free and Accepted Masons of Minnesota," is the oldest independent Masonic Grand Lodge established in Minnesota, United States. It was formed in 1853.

== History ==
Many early settlers from the eastern and southern states brought Freemasonry with them to their new homes in the frontier west. In the growing and thriving villages of Stillwater and Saint Paul these men sought the companionship of other Masons.

The first recorded Masonic meeting in the Territory was held on May 31, 1849, in Saint Paul. A meeting notice had been published in the first newspaper in the Territory, the Minnesota Pioneer. The meeting was held in a room above the newspaper office. No written record exists as to what transpired at this, or at two subsequent meetings; it may be surmised, however, that this group of Masons discussed the varied forms of the masonic work from their home jurisdictions. They would have also made plans for obtaining a dispensation to confer the degrees on willing and deserving candidates. Similarly, other Masons were meeting and talking about the formation of a lodge in Stillwater as early as November 1849. Not until 1851 would a third group of Masons seek to form a lodge in the hamlet of Saint Anthony.

The Grand Lodge of Minnesota was formed by the union of three chartered Lodges: Saint Johns Lodge No. 1, operating under a charter from the Grand Lodge of Wisconsin, dispensation granted October 12, 1850; Cataract Lodge No. 2, operating under a charter granted by the Grand Lodge of Illinois, dispensation granted February 5, 1852; and St. Paul Lodge No. 3, operating under a charter granted by the Grand Lodge of Ohio, dispensation granted August 8, 1849.

The creation of the Grand Lodge took place at a convention held on February 23–24, 1853 in Saint Paul, five years before Minnesota was admitted as a state. The Grand Lodge was formally constituted on February 24, 1853, with its headquarters in Saint Paul. It later relocated to Bloomington in 2006, where it remains to this day.
