= Grand Lodge of Nebraska =

US Freemasonry body

Grand Lodge, A.F. & A.M. of Nebraska
- Established: September 23, 1857
- Location: US
- Region served: Nebraska
- Grand Master: Mike Jones (2002, 2026)
- Website: glne.org

The Grand Lodge of Ancient, Free and Accepted Masons of Nebraska is the primary governing body of Freemasonry in the U.S. state of Nebraska. It was established on September 23, 1857. The Grand Lodge of Nebraska is headquartered at Lincoln, Nebraska.

== History ==
The Grand Lodge Of Nebraska was formed in 1857, when the Masters and Wardens of three lodges organized a Grand Lodge for the then newly established Nebraska Territory. Those subordinate lodges were: Nebraska Lodge No. 184 (chartered from the Grand Lodge of Illinois), Giddings Lodge No. 156 (chartered from the Grand Lodge of Missouri) and Capitol Lodge No. 101 (chartered from the Grand Lodge Of Iowa). With the formation of the Grand Lodge, these three lodges went on to become: "Nebraska Lodge No. 1," "Western Star Lodge No. 2," and "Capitol Lodge No. 3," respectively.

== Prince Hall Mason Grand Lodge of Nebraska ==
The first Prince Hall Masonic Lodges first formed in Nebraska in the 1890s. On February 3, 1990, during the 133rd Annual Communication of the Grand Lodge, a resolution was passed extending fraternal recognition to the Prince Hall Grand Lodge, F.&A.M. of Nebraska. That same year, the Prince Hall Grand Lodge reciprocated that recognition. During next year's Annual Communication, it was reported that members of both Grand Lodges participated in each other's degree work, and even participated in a Table Lodge together. Today, Prince Hall Masons meet at the former Druid Hall of the Woodmen of the World in the Saratoga neighborhood of North Omaha.

== Notable Freemasons from Nebraska ==
For a list of notable Freemasons from other jurisdictions, see the List of Freemasons.

- Robert C. Jordan: Capitol Lodge No. 3 - First Grand Master of Nebraska.
- Robert Wilkinson Furnas: Brownville Lodge No. 4 - Second Elected Governor of Nebraska (1873-1875), Fourth Grand Master of Nebraska (1865-1866)
- George W. Lininger: Capitol Lodge No. 3, Grand Master of Nebraska, 1877
- William Jennings Bryan: Lincoln Lodge No. 19.
- William F. "Buffalo Bill" Cody: Platte Valley Lodge No. 32.
- Peter Kiewit: George W. Lininger Lodge No. 268.
- John J. Pershing, 33°: Lincoln Lodge No. 19.
- Nathan Roscoe Pound: Lancaster Lodge No. 54.

== See also ==
- History of Omaha
