= Grand Lodge of California =

Masonic group in San Francisco, California, US

Grand Lodge of Free and Accepted Masons of California
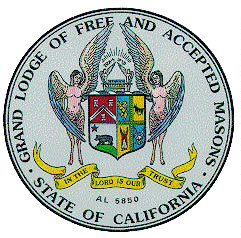
- Official seal
- Established: April 17, 1850; 176 years ago
- Legal status: Operating
- Headquarters: SF Masonic Auditorium
- Coordinates: 37.791°N 122.413°W
- Region served: California
- General Secretary: R.W. Allan L. Casalou
- Grand Master: M.W. Ara Maloyan
- Website: Official website

The Grand Lodge of Free & Accepted Masons of California, commonly called the Grand Lodge of California, is one of the two Masonic Grand Lodges in the state recognized by the United Grand Lodge of England, the other being the Most Worshipful Prince Hall Grand Lodge of California Free & Accepted Masons. The Grand Lodge of California is headquartered in San Francisco, California.

== History ==
The Grand Lodge of California was established in Sacramento in 1850, a few months before California became a state. A decade later, California Freemasonry had over 5,000 members, and lodges up and down the state. Many of the leaders of early California counted themselves among its members.

== Auditorium ==
Its administrative offices are located on the upper floors of the SF Masonic Auditorium, also known as the Nob Hill Masonic Auditorium.

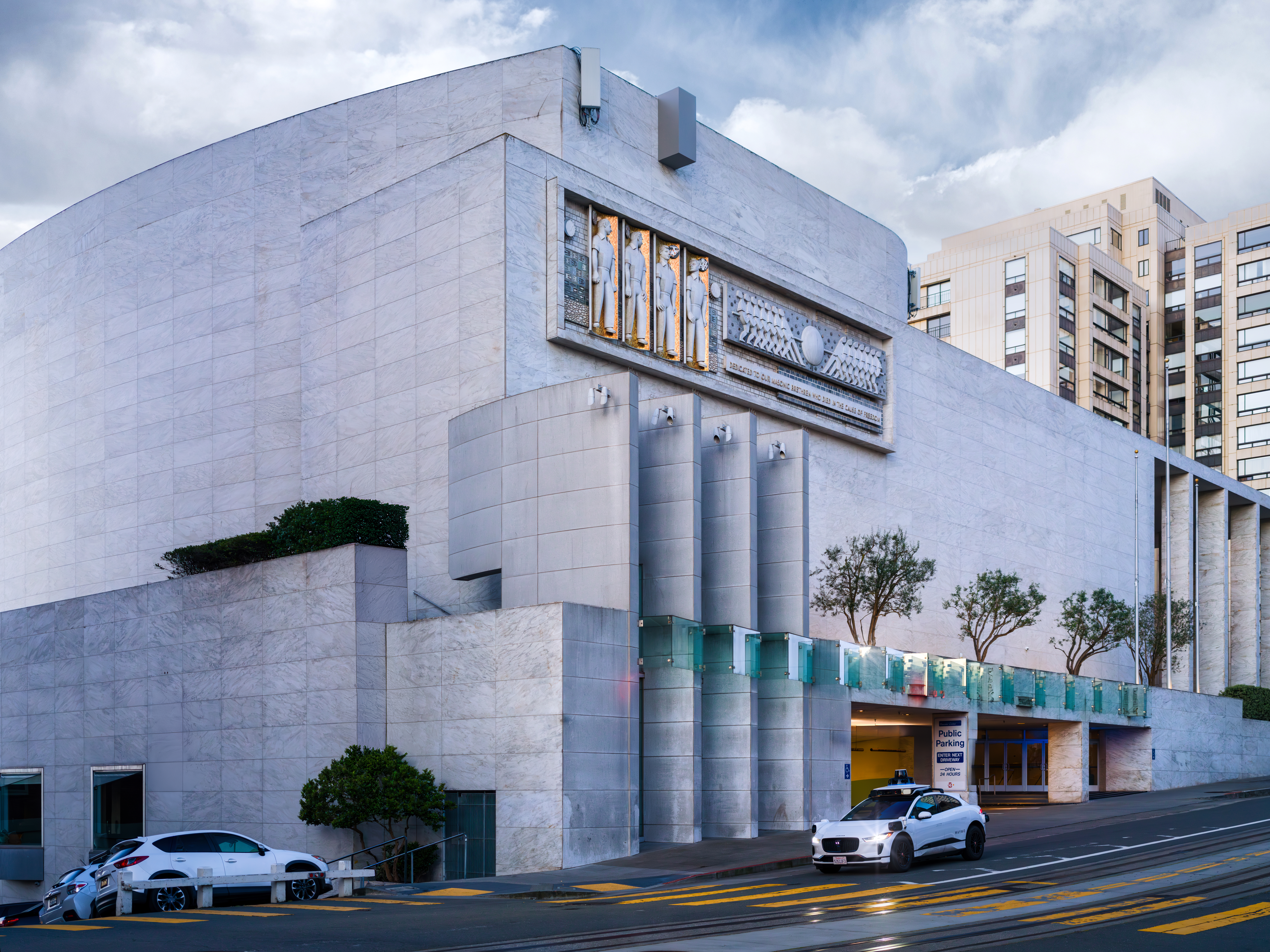
San Francisco Masonic Auditorium, home of the Grand Lodge of California

== Leadership ==
The current Grand Master of Masons in California is Ara Maloyan, who was elected at the 177^{th} Annual Communication of the Grand Lodge that took place from October 9^{th}–11^{th}, 2026.

== See also ==
- List of notable Masonic buildings in California
