= Grand Lodge of Wisconsin =

Grand Lodge of Wisconsin F. & A.M.
- Established: January 17, 1844
- Location: US
- Region served: Wisconsin
- Members: over 14,000
- Website: www.wimasons.org/

The Grand Lodge of Wisconsin, Free and Accepted Masons is the largest of several governing bodies of Freemasonry in Wisconsin, being solely of the Ancients' tradition and descending from the Ancient Grand Lodge of England, founded in 1751. Freemasonry in Wisconsin first took organized form on the night of December 27, 1823 when seven army officers and three civilians met at the home of Brother George Johnston on the west bank of the Fox River in what is now Green Bay. The soldiers were attached to the 3rd Regiment and stationed at Fort Howard under the command of Col. John McNeil, also a Freemason. Wisconsin was then part of the Michigan Territory and very lightly settled. The Grand Lodge of Wisconsin was formed and charters granted to representatives from Mineral Point # 1, Melody #2 of Platteville and Kilbourn #3 of Milwaukee on January 17, 1844. Wisconsin has 180 Lodges with a membership totaling over 10,400.

== History ==
Freemasonry in Wisconsin first took organized form on the night of December 27, 1823 when seven army officers and three civilians met at the home of Brother George Johnston on the west bank of the Fox River in what is now Green Bay. The soldiers were attached to the 3rd Regiment and stationed at Fort Howard under the command of Col. John McNeil, also a Freemason. Wisconsin was then part of the Michigan Territory and very lightly settled. Native Americans still roamed freely and played havoc with traders on the Fox and the soldiers were there to maintain order and protect the settlers in this vast wilderness.

Desiring to form a lodge, the men sent a petition to the Grand Lodge of New York requesting a charter. Dispensation for the formation of a lodge was granted, and on September 2, 1824, the interested brethren met again to organize it. Their charter from the Grand Lodge of New York was dated December 3.

During the following year, Menomanie Lodge #374 ceased to be a military lodge and became a public one. An 1854 address given in Green Bay showcased the lodge’s records dating back to 1827 and its cessation as a lodge in 1830. It was, therefore, never chartered as a “Wisconsin” lodge; moreover, its New York charter was destroyed in a fire during 1870 at Washington Lodge #21, Green Bay.

Carved out of the original Michigan Territory in 1836, the rich lead mines of the southwestern Wisconsin territory attracted a large influx of settlers, including influential men from Missouri and Illinois. These men too, looked forward to organizing lodges of Freemasonry.

Melody Lodge No. 49 under the Grand Lodge of Missouri received a dispensation at Mineral Point on October 8, 1840. Organized on July 27, 1841, it was granted a charter in October 1842 and began work on February 15, 1843.

Meanwhile, on January 10, 1843, a second dispensation came from Missouri to form Lodge No. 65, about 20 miles from Mineral Point in Platteville. With dispensation granted on June 12, 1843, The Grand Lodge of Illinois, as that area’s Grand jurisdiction, chartered Milwaukee Lodge No. 22.

The Grand Lodge of Wisconsin was formed and charters granted to representatives from Mineral Point # 1, Melody #2 of Platteville and Kilbourn #3 of Milwaukee on January 17, 1844.
