= List of Masonic Grand Lodges =

This is a list of all verifiable organizations that claim to be a Masonic Grand Lodge.

A Masonic "Grand Lodge" (or sometimes "Grand Orient") is the governing body that supervises the individual "Lodges of Freemasons" in a particular geographical area, known as its "jurisdiction" (usually corresponding to a sovereign state or other major geopolitical unit). Some are large, with thousands of members divided into hundreds of subordinate lodges, while others are tiny, with only a few members split between a handful of local lodges. Sometimes there will only be one Grand Lodge in a given area, but the majority of the time there will be at least two. More often, there will be several competing Grand Lodges claiming the same jurisdictional area, or claiming overlapping areas. This fact leads to debates over legitimacy: Not all Grand Lodges and Grand Orients recognize each other as being legitimate. However, such recognition is not relevant to this list, yet recognition is foundational within the fraternal order. Inclusion in this list only requires the establishment of a physical (as opposed to a virtual, or online) presence, and lodges (regular, unrecognized or clandestine) which acknowledge their governance.

Membership numbers are subject to change; for current figures, check the sources which are indicated in the reference section.

External organizations or affiliations are higher governing bodies where grand lodges are grouped, within each external organization, the grand lodges may have treaties of friendship and recognition with each other. This does not mean that there is a direct relationship or recognition between external organizations.

== External organizations or affiliations ==
Abbreviation	Name	Founded	Notes
AACEE	Adogmatic Associations of Central and Eastern Europe	2001	The AACEE brings together all Liberal Masonic Obediences from Central and Eastern Europe respecting the same values and willing to participate to a common mission.
L'AMIL	L'Association maçonnique intercontinentale libérale	1996	
CATENA	International Masonic Union Catena	1961	Grand lodges with male and female membership.
CGLREU	Confederación de Grandes Logias Regulares de los Estados Unidos Mexicanos		An association of Mexican state grand lodges, many of whom are in amity with CGMNA jurisdictions and UGLE. Some older and larger CGLREU jurisdictions have also joined the multi-national association of CMI, although the two organizations are not linked.
CGLEM	Confederation of Grand Lodges of Europe and Mediterranean		An association of grand lodges in the Mediterranean area and Southern Europe. Not to be confused with GLUDE. Established by the Traditional and Modern Grand Lodge of France, the National Grand Lodge of Freemasons of Italy, Grand Lodge communities of Andalusia, The Regular Grand Lodge of Portugal, and The National Grand Lodge of Morocco ( GLNM).
CGMNA or COGMNA	Conference of Grand Masters in North America	1928	An organization of Grand Lodge leaders, representing 64 sovereign jurisdictions located throughout the US, Canada, Mexico and Germany. Its members are broadly recognized by jurisdictions throughout the world. Today, these CGMNA jurisdictions serve over 2 million Freemasons in North America. Its oldest constituent Grand Lodge dates itself to 1733.
CIMAS	Confederación Interamericana de Masonería Simbólica	2002	Independent Liberal and Adogmatic body.
CIGLU formerly known as GLUE	Confédération Internationale des Grandes Loges Unies	2000	Confédération des Grandes Loges Unies d'Europe (GLUE) was founded in Paris on June 18, 2000. It only admits grand lodges using the Ancient and Accepted Scottish Rite, founded by the Grand Lodge of France (GLdF), la Grande Loge Traditionnelle et Symbolique Opéra (of France) and la Grande Loge Nationale de Serbie (then Yugoslavia). In 2014, they increase their influence beyond Europe, changing their name to Confédération Internationale des Grandes Loges Unies (CIGLU).
CLIMAF	Centre de Liaison International de la Maçonnerie Féminine	1982	An association of women's grand lodges, mostly in Europe.
CLIPSAS	Centre de Liaison et d'Information des Puissances maçonniques Signataires de l'Appel de Strasbourg	1961	Organized by the Grand Orient of France (GOF), member jurisdictions reject Anderson's 1723 constitutions, do not require belief in a supreme being, and make no distinction regarding participation by men or women.
CMI	Confederación Masónica Interamericana (CMI) (Interamerican Masonic Confederation)	1947	An organization of South and Central American Grand Lodges. Its members are broadly recognized by CGMNA grand lodges and the United Grand Lodge of England. Founded by the grand lodges of Argentina, Chile and Uruguay, by 2014 the CMI had almost 75 member grand lodges.
CMB	Confederacion Masonica Bolivariana	1990	An organization of grand lodges in South America (Colombia, Bolivia, Ecuador, Panamá, Perú and Venezuela).
CMC	Confederacion Masonica Colombiana	1982	An organization of state and national lodges within Colombia.
CMCA	Confederacion Masonica Centroamericana		An organization of state and national lodges in Central America.
COMAB	Confederação Maçônica do Brasil	1973	An association of independent Grand Orients in Brazil
COMAM	Conferencia Masónica Americana (American Masonic Conference)		This Masonic organization, formed by Grand Lodges and Grand Orient of the American continent, was created in Santiago de Chile in order to serve as a nexus and union of the Liberal and adogmatic, male, female and mixed Obediences that aim at the work of individual perfection with absolute freedom of conscience.
CMSB	Confederação da Maçonaria Simbólica do Brasil	1965	An association of grand lodges in Brazil
DH	Le Droit Humain	1893	International mixed (male and female) Freemasonry. Also known as "Co-Masonry".
EMA	European Masonic Alliance		The EMA (AME) is referenced in the Register of Transparency of the European Commission, and has several meetings a year with the president or vice-president of the European Commission, as well as meeting European Senators.
EME	L'Espace Maçonnique Européen	2002	Promotion of human rights and secularism
GLIM	Gran Logia Itinerante de Mexico	1788	A military-founded masonic body. The itinerant lodges were established by the Spanish soldiers that arrived to Mexico previous to the Independence Movement. Their lodges were inherited by their founders descendants, all part of the freemasonry on their cities. This lodges have the attribution to work anywhere there are at least 3 Master Masons.
GLMAE	Gran Logia Mixta de los Andes Ecuatoriales (GLMAE)	2011	Ecuadorian association of mixed (male and female) lodges
HC	High Council (HC) or Masonic High Council (MHC)	2005	An association of jurisdictions styling themselves as High Councils. Organized by the Regular Grand Lodge of England (RGLE), which serves as the HC's Mother High Council. Highly volatile, These groups do not publish member counts nor addresses, and may exist only on the internet or as a function of one or two persons. External citations needed.
IMF	Institut Maçonnique de France	2002	Instigated by the GOF, with collaboration by the GLdF and seven other French masonic bodies, the IMF allows low-level cooperation on promotion of Masonic book fairs and events that address the conditions of man and society. The GLdF left this organization in 2006.
Int. FM	International Freemasons		An African-American oriented group of grand lodges in the United States founded in 1950.
LFB	Les Franc-maçons Belges		An organization of Belgian grand lodges
National Compact	Prince Hall - National Compact	1847	Subordinate Grand Lodges of the Prince Hall National Grand Lodge
NUGLB	National United Grand Lodges of Bulgaria	2016	Association of Grand Lodges in Bulgaria (Shared United Bulgarian Orient - shared jurisdiction)
PHA	Prince Hall Affiliation (PHA)	1870	An association of 49 historically black Grand Lodges located throughout North America, the Caribbean, and Liberia, which trace their origin to Prince Hall, of Massachusetts. Many of these GLs are in amity with their CGMNA counterparts and with the United Grand Lodge of England. Today there are over 4,500 PHA lodges worldwide, and of them, the oldest constituent PHA lodge dates itself to 1797.
PHCGM	Prince Hall Conference of Grand Masters	1887	An organization of Prince Hall Affiliated (PHA) Grand Lodge leaders, from 49 Prince Hall Affiliated (PHA) grand lodges.
REHFRAM	Rencontres Humanistes et Fraternelles Africaines et Malgaches		An organization of African regular and liberal lodges, meeting annually in an African capital.
SCIC	Suprême Conseil International du Canada (International Supreme Council of Canada)	2019	SCIC is the governing body that maintains uniformity for the 4^{th}–33^{rd} degrees of the Ancient and Accepted Scottish Rite practiced by the Grand ANI Lodge of Canada and the Grand Orient of Quebec.
SIMPA	Secrétariat international Maçonnique des Puissances Adogmatiques	1998	Some of the larger Grand Lodges in CLIPSAS left in 1998 to form their own organisation. Most have now rejoined and SIMPA is currently dormant.
SOGLIA	Society of Grand Lodges in Alliance	2010	SOGLIA is confederation of Grand freemason Obedience's which all members obey principles of Regularity. Assembled annually, in different places of the world, in order to share fellowship and to promote Masonic tradition, SOGLIA members are respecting the autonomy of each Grand Lodge. That is expressed by variety of accepted and recognized Rituals practiced in our Grand Lodges around the world. Our association was born in the year 6010.Y:T:L: by signing the Treaty of Arezzo, in the city that welcomed eight Grand Masters representing eight Grand Lodges. Subsequently, more Grand Lodges have join SOGLIA spanning our society to the five continents.
UMM	L’Union Maçonnique de la Méditerranée (UMM) (Masonic Union of the Mediterranean)	2000	An association of fifteen adogmatic and liberal jurisdictions from countries bordering the Mediterranean and Mediterranean culture. Since 2012, the UMM has been controlled by the Grande Loge Féminine de France and the Fédération Française du Droit Humain.
UMMT	Unione Mondiale Massonica Tradizionale (UMMT) (World Traditional Masonic Union)	2013	Self-reported as "approximately 30 members", the UMMT includes European jurisdictions not in amity with UGLE or the larger jurisdictions in their nations. Admits mixed Grand Lodges and use of the Ancient and Primitive Rite de Memphis-Misraïm.
VGLvD	Vereinigte Großlogen von Deutschland (United Grand Lodges of Germany)	1958-04-27	A sovereign federation of five autonomous Grand Lodges, it serves as the national Grand Lodge of Germany to all outside German Masonry (Masons of other nations and the German public)
GLM	Grand Lodges of the Mediterranean	2024	The Grand Lodges of the Mediterranean (GLM), a transcontinental Masonic alliance that unites Brothers from Europe, the Orient, and Africa. Drawing from the rich cultural, intellectual, and spiritual heritage of Mediterranean civilizations, the GLM is committed to promoting fraternity, freedom, and tolerance. Together, we aim to build a vibrant, inclusive Masonic community that transcends cultural and geographical boundaries.
UMA	Universal Masonic Alliance	2025	International Masonic Confederation, open to all Sovereign obediences that uphold diverse canons of regularity in accordance with the Masonic Constitution, with the purpose of strengthening the Chain of Union.

== See also ==
- History of Masonic Grand Lodges in North America
- Masonic bodies
