= Grand Lodge of Connecticut =

Grand Lodge of Connecticut A.F. & A.M.
- Seal of the Grand Lodge of Connecticut A.F. & A.M.
- Established: May, 1789
- Location: USA
- Region served: Connecticut
- Website: ctfreemasons.net

The Grand Lodge of Ancient Free & Accepted Masons of the State of Connecticut is the main governing body of Freemasonry in the U.S. state of Connecticut as recognized by the United Grand Lodge of England. The Grand Lodge of Connecticut is headquartered at Wallingford, Connecticut.

== History ==
Freemasonry was first established in Connecticut from the city of New Haven in 1750. David Wooster was the charter Master of "The Lodge at New Haven", which later became Hiram Lodge No. 1. This lodge was formed under warrant from St. John's Provincial Grand Lodge at Boston.

The Grand Lodge of Connecticut was founded on July 8, 1789 with Pierpont Edwards as its first Grand Master. At the founding of the Grand Lodge of Connecticut, it had 14 lodges with five more being chartered in the following two years. The first lodge chartered by the Grand Lodge of Connecticut was Moriah Lodge No. 15 in Brooklyn Connecticut constituted on October 15, 1790.

In 1887, Hiram Lodge challenged the authority of the Grand Lodge of Connecticut to dictate the style of ritual it would use.

== Membership ==
As in most Masonic jurisdictions, membership in a Masonic Lodge under the jurisdiction of the Grand Lodge of Connecticut is open to any male over 18 years of age who believes in a Supreme Being and is of sound moral character. One member of a Local Lodge being petitioned must be willing to sign his petition as Recommender, and any other Master Mason must sign as Avoucher. His election is by unanimous consent. In addition, Connecticut Lodges require a candidate to be a Connecticut resident for at least one year.

== Prince Hall Freemasonry in Connecticut ==
On October 14, 1989, the Grand Lodge of Connecticut became the first Mainstream Grand Lodge in the United States to formally recognize and maintain the recognition of Prince Hall Freemasonry. Both Grand Lodges allow dual-membership rights for its members.

== Notable Connecticut Freemasons ==
- Benedict Arnold - American Revolutionary War General and Traitor - Hiram Lodge No. 1, New Haven
- Samuel Colt - American inventor and industrialist - St. John's Lodge No. 4, Hartford
- Pierpont Edwards - Delegate to the American Continental Congress and United States Federal judge - Hiram Lodge No. 1, New Haven
- Israel Putnam - American Revolutionary War general, who fought with distinction at the Battle of Bunker Hill - Military lodge in Crown Point
- Rob Simmons - Retired U.S. Army Colonel and former U.S. Congressman from Connecticut - Coastal Lodge No. 57, Stonington
- David Wooster - American Revolutionary War general - Hiram Lodge No. 1, New Haven
- Lyman Law - Member of the U.S. House of Representatives and Sixth Grand Master of the Grand Lodge of Connecticut - Wooster Lodge No. 10, Colchester
- Hiram Bingham III - American academic, explorer and politician. He made public the existence of the Inca citadel of Machu Picchu. Later, Bingham served as a member of the United States Senate for the state of Connecticut - Hiram Lodge No. 1, New Haven
- Oliver Wolcott Jr. - 2nd United States Secretary of the Treasury, a United States circuit judge of the United States Circuit Court for the Second Circuit and the 24th Governor of Connecticut St. John's Lodge No. 4, Hartford.

== See also ==
- List of notable Masonic buildings in Connecticut
