= Grand Lodge of New Jersey =

State freemasonry governing body

Grand Lodge of New Jersey F. & A.M.
- Established: January 30, 1787
- Location: USA
- Region served: The State of New Jersey
- Grand Master: MW Omar S. Morris
- Website: newjerseygrandlodge.org

The Grand Lodge of New Jersey Free & Accepted Masons is the official governing body of New Jersey Masonic Lodges as recognized by other Grand Jurisdictions throughout the world. As early as 1730, New Jersey was one of the first states with active Freemasonry. The Grand Lodge of NJ was formally established in 1787. The Most Worshipful Prince Hall Grand Lodge of State of New Jersey and The Most Worshipful Grand Lodge of New Jersey recognize each other as Masonic Grand Lodges.

== History of the Lodge ==
=== Background ===
The first known Freemason to live in the "New World" is believed to be John Skene, who was a member of Aberdeen Lodge #1 in Scotland. His name appears as the 27th listed in one of the oldest written records of Freemasons, the Mark Book of Aberdeen Lodge#1 (1670), as "Merchand and Meason". Records being vague of the membership to protect trade secrets, John Skene's name is the first that can be traced to the new world. John Forbes, another Freemason from Aberdeen Lodge #1, moved to Plainfield, New Jersey in 1684 only to go back to Scotland the following year. Several other Masons from Aberdeen Lodge #1 moved to West Jersey during the same period but most shortly moved back to Scotland.

The passage for many of these Masons was secured by Harrie Elphingson (Master of Aberdeen Lodge #1 at the time of the Mark Book of 1670) as booking agent and under the patronage of the Earl of Perth, himself a Freemason. Skene moved to the Province of West Jersey in 1682. According to The National Society of The Colonial Dames of America (NSCDA), Skene purchased a 300 arce property in 1674 (though there is no evidence that he came to Jersey before 1682) that he named Peachfield. It was in the Second Tenth of the Province, an area that would become Northampton Township, Burlington County, New Jersey (Nov. 6th, 1688) and then Westampton Township, New Jersey (March 6, 1850) near Burlington, New Jersey. Skene served as Deputy Governor of West Jersey from 1684 until 1692.

=== Freemasonry in the Early American Colonies ===
On June 5 of 1730, the Grand Master of England, Thomas Howard, 8th Duke of Norfolk, appointed Daniel Coxe, Jr., of West Jersey as Provincial Grand Master of Freemasons for the provinces of New York, New Jersey and Pennsylvania. It has been said that he died before he had chartered a single lodge and that there is no evidence that Coxe ever did any Masonic work whatsoever while serving as Grand Master, but certain records indicate differently. His authority would have been brought to practical operation for the forming of a Lodge in Philadelphia, which the press of the day indicates existed in 1732 with William Allen as the Master. Also made a Mason during this period was Benjamin Franklin on February 1, 1731 at St. John's Lodge, which was itself founded in 1730 (perhaps St. John's Day, June 24). It is also indicated that it was not customary for Provincial Grand Masters abroad (away from England) to send any reports of their doings. Franklin later went on to form another Lodge in Philadelphia, seeking authority from Henry Price, the Grand Master of Masons for New England.
