= Universe (Masonic Lodge) =

Universe Masonic Lodge of the Grand Orient of Poland
- Respectable Lodge Universe, Grand Orient of Poland
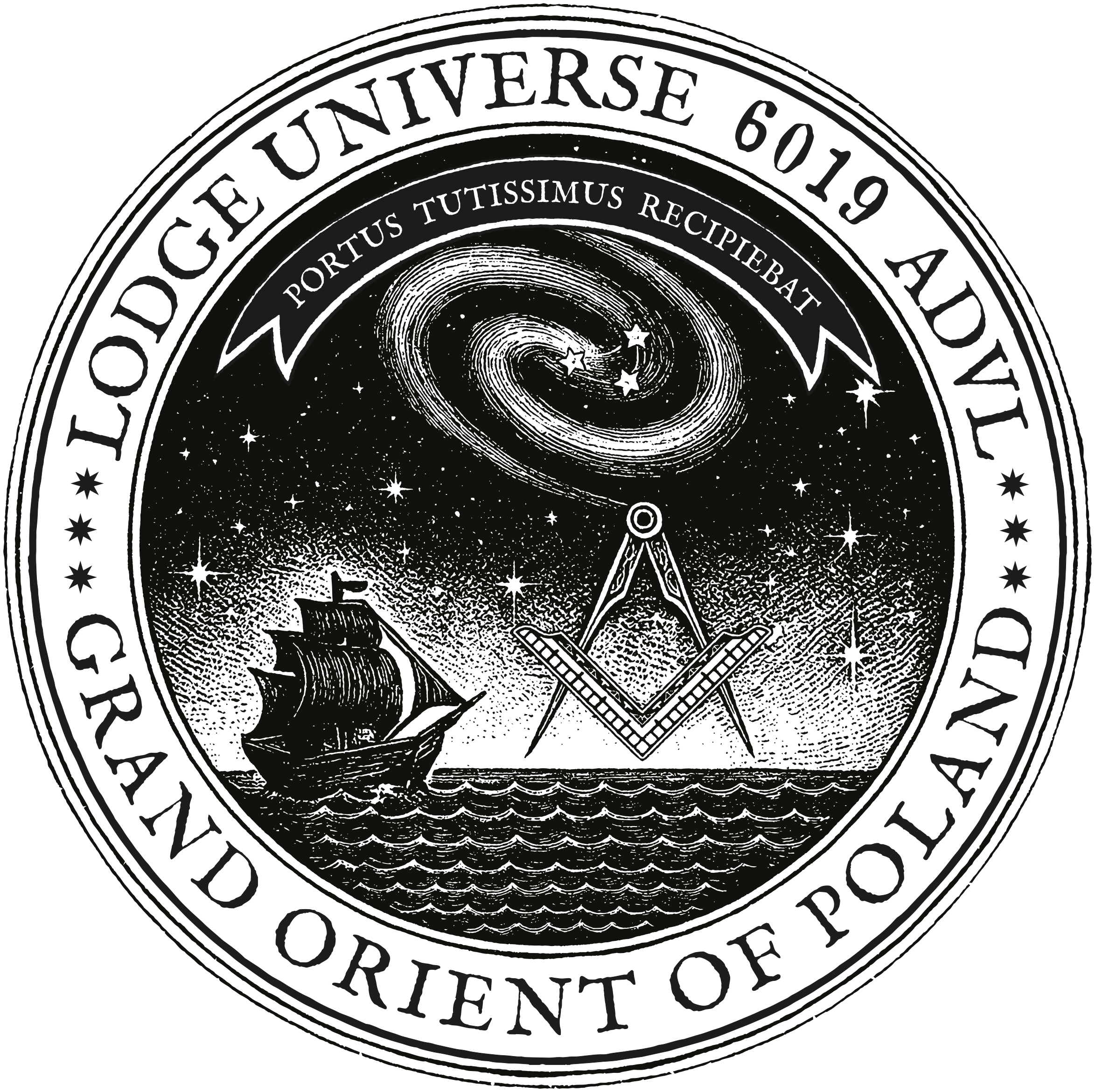
- Seal of the Lodge Universe
- Established: 29th of September 2019
- Founder: Grand Orient of Poland
- Type: Masonic Lodge
- Headquarters: Warsaw, Poland
- Members: adults of all gender & religion, or lack thereof
- Official language: English
- Worshipful Master: Cecilia Bernal de Siloé
- Parent organization: Grand Orient of Poland
- Affiliations: Grand Orient of Poland, Grand Orient of France, Grand Orient of Switzerland, Grand Lodge of Italy, Grand Orient of Romania, Grand Orient of Ireland, Grand Lodge Lemuria, Traditional Masonic Order - Mauritius, Grand Orient of Slovenia, International Masonic Order DELPHI, Grand Orient of Belgium, Grand National Lodge of Croatia, Grande Loge féminine de France, Symbolic Grand Lodge of Spain, Grand Orient of Bulgaria, Grand Orient of Austria, Grand Orient of Estonia, Grande Loja Feminina de Portugal, Grande Loge indépendante et souveraine des Rites unis, Grand Orient of Portugal, LIBERTAS International Grand Lodge of Freemasons for Women and Men, Grand Lodge of Cultures and Spirituality, Sovereign Grand Lodge of the Philippine Archipelago
- Website: Lodge Official Page

The Universe is a liberal Masonic lodge operating under the jurisdiction of the Grand Orient of Poland. Established in 2019 in Warsaw, it represents the first English-speaking Masonic lodge in Poland to admit candidates and visitors irrespective of their gender and ethnicity. The Lodge promotes the Freemasonic values of liberty, equality, and fraternity, welcoming all Freemasons regardless of background. Its primary mission is to serve as a safe harbour for worldwide Freemasons seeking the craft in Poland.

== History ==
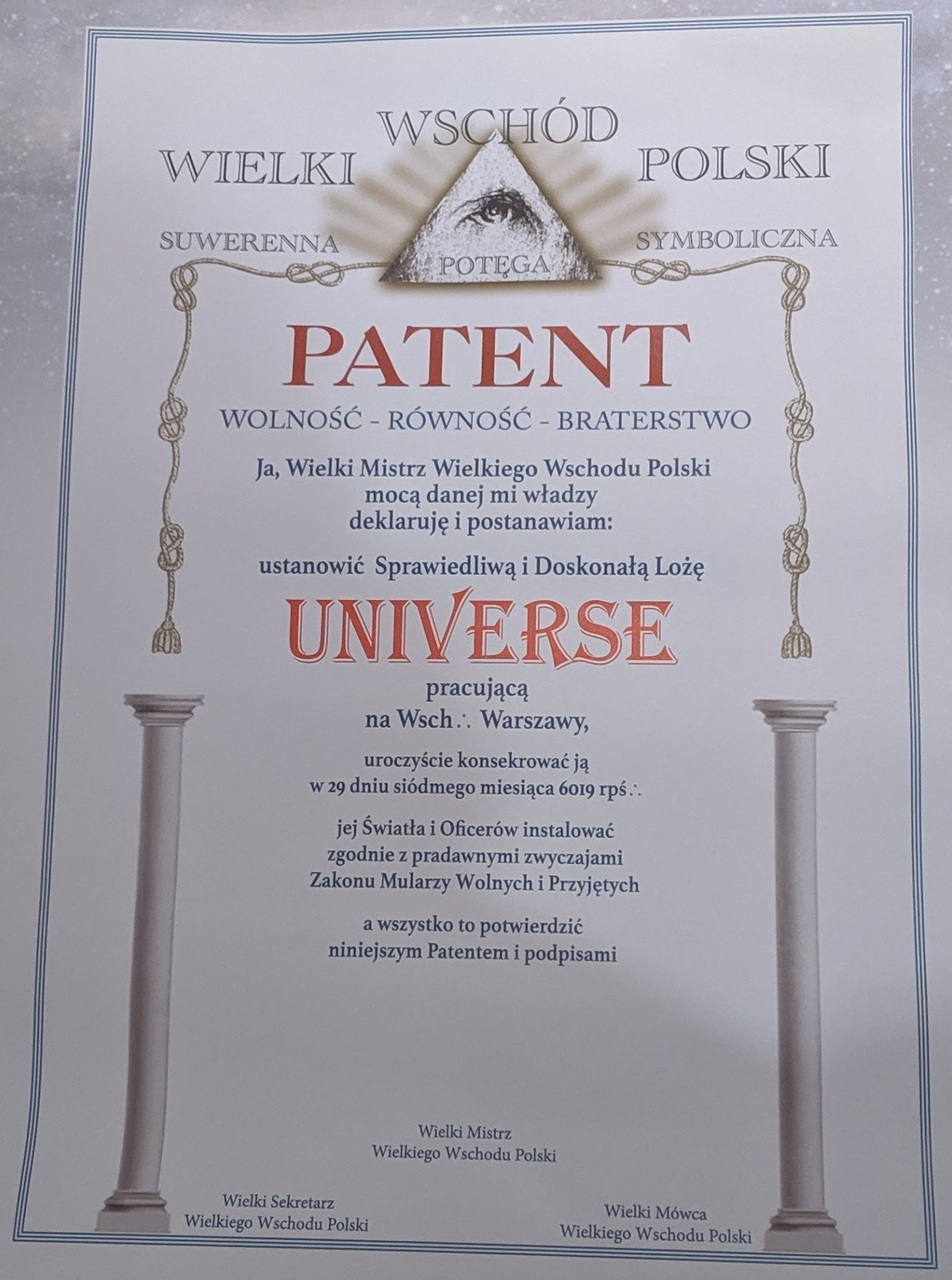
Patent of the Lodge Universe granted by the Grand Orient of Poland

Lodge was founded to fulfill the necessity for an inclusive Masonic environment conducting its proceedings in English in Poland. As a constituent body of the Grand Orient of Poland, a liberal Masonic obedience, it champions the principles of freedom of conscience, secularism, and the respect for human rights. Established in Warsaw in 2019, the Lodge was duly recognized by its Founding Lodge, Liberty Restored, which is the oldest masonic lodge in Poland, originally established in 1796.

As an integral component of the Grand Orient of Poland, the Lodge plays a significant role in advancing liberal Freemasonry within the nation. Its establishment was highlighted across both Polish and international Masonic publications.

== Principles and philosophical orientation ==
The Respectable Lodge Universe is structured as a secular, non-denominational entity that remains strictly neutral on matters of religious faith, supporting no single belief system. During Lodge proceedings, participants are prohibited from engaging in political or religious debates to ensure a respectful and objective setting welcoming to individuals of all ideological backgrounds. Anchored in the philosophy of the Enlightenment, the Lodge centers its foundational principles on liberty, equality, and fraternity.

== Worshipful Masters ==
In Freemasonry, the Lodge's leader (‘’Worshipful Master’’) is typically succeeded every three years after annual elections, where all eligible members of the Lodge cast their vote.

- 2019 – 2023: Franz Solon
- 2023 – 2026: Marcin Stanczak
- 2026 – currently: Cecilia Bernal de Siloé

== Membership ==
The Lodge is composed of individuals from North and South America, Africa, Asia, and Europe, as well as Polish nationals who were the initial founders. It extends a welcome to candidates of all nationalities, genders, and cultural backgrounds, provided they adhere to the liberal and progressive principles of the Grand Orient of Poland. In accordance with this inclusive ethos, the Lodge actively invites interested parties to make direct contact to express their desire for membership. The Lodge has steadfastly maintained that it remains open to all applications submitted freely and voluntarily, consistent with the tenets of liberal Freemasonry.

== Structure and organization ==
The Lodge operates within the established framework of the three traditional degrees: Entered Apprentice, Fellowcraft, and Master Mason. English serves as the official language of the Lodge, thereby enabling participation by both international and national members, as well as visiting dignitaries. The Lodge extends regular invitations to visiting Brethren from other Lodges affiliated with comparable liberal Masonic obediences, including, but not limited to, the Grand Orient of France, the Grand Orient of Belgium, the Grand Lodge of Italy, and the Symbolic Grand Lodge of Spain. Similarly to the Grand Orient of Poland and its Founding Lodge Liberty Restored, all members adhere to the tenets of the liberal French Rite, and all candidates for Lodge offices are selected through a democratic electoral procedure.

== Freemasonry and religion ==
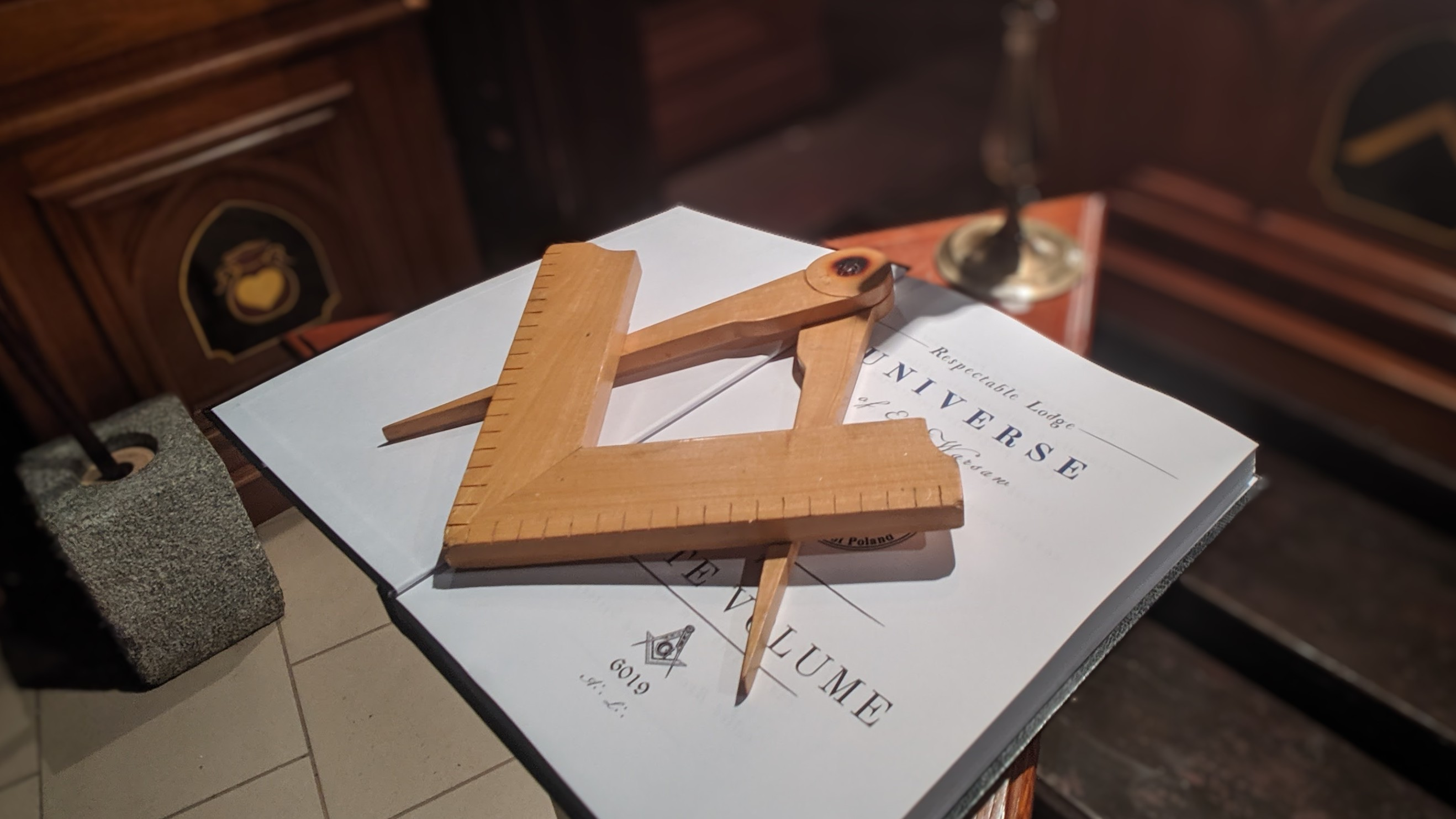
Altar of the Lodge Universe with the Volume of Sacred Law

In line with the principles of liberal Freemasonry as practiced by the Grand Orient of Poland, Lodge Universe is neither a religious organization nor a religious movement. It does not promote any specific faith, creed, or system of worship. Membership is open to individuals of all religions as well as those without religious affiliation, provided they support the Lodge’s philosophical and Enlightenment-based values. This is further indicated by the blank pages of the Volume of Sacred Law resting upon the Temple's altar. In accordance with this approach, religious and political discussions are excluded from Lodge meetings, to preserve a neutral space dedicated to ethical reflection, personal development, and fraternal cooperation.

== Activities and cultural engagement ==
The Lodge, beyond its internal Masonic proceedings, undertakes initiatives directed at promoting international and cross-cultural discourse, preserving civic values, and championing human dignity.

Periodically, the Lodge organizes public addresses and symposia focused on matters of freedom, human rights, and moral advancement. These gatherings are accessible to individuals external to the organization's membership.

== International cooperation ==
Pursuant to reciprocal agreements of amity and collaboration, the Lodge Universe, operating under the jurisdiction of the Grand Orient of Poland, engages in international cooperation with masonic organizations affiliated with the following organizations and Orders

1. Grand Orient of France
2. Grand Orient of Switzerland
3. Grand Lodge of Italy
4. Grand Orient of Romania
5. Grand Orient of Ireland
6. Grand Lodge Lemuria (Mauritius)
7. Traditional Masonic Order - Mauritius
8. Grand Orient of Slovenia
9. International Masonic Order DELPHI - Greece
10. Grand Orient of Belgium
11. Grand National Lodge of Croatia
12. Grande Loge Féminine de France
13. Symbolic Grand Lodge of Spain
14. Grand Orient of Bulgaria
15. Grand Orient of Austria
16. Grand Orient of Estonia
17. Grande Loja Feminina de Portugal
18. Grande Loge Indépendante et Souveraine des Rites Unis
19. Grand Orient of Portugal
20. LIBERTAS International Grand Lodge of Freemasons for Women and Men
21. Grand Lodge of Cultures and Spirituality
22. Sovereign Grand Lodge of the Philippine Archipelago

== Additional facts ==
- The name "Universe" was chosen to emphasize the Lodge's open and inclusive character, aiming to reflect the universality of Freemasonry beyond national, cultural, or religious boundaries.
- The Lodge's seal features symbolic elements inspired by both traditional Freemasonry and Enlightenment Era iconography.
- Meetings are held in English to allow participation from members of over a dozen nationalities, making it one of the most internationally diverse Lodges in Poland.
- It is one of few Lodges of its kind in Central Europe where women and men are admitted on completely equal footing, following the principles of mixed-gender Freemasonry.
- The members of the Lodge have diverse backgrounds in academia, literature, diplomacy, the arts, science, business, philosophy, engineering and more, contributing to a rich and multidisciplinary internal culture.

== Emblem and symbolism ==
The seal of the Lodge is rich in symbolic meaning, reflecting the Masonic principles of universality, enlightenment, and personal transformation.

- "Universe 6019" – The number refers to the Masonic calendar, where the Anno Della Vera Luce (Year of True Light) is calculated by adding 4000 to the Gregorian calendar. This marks the Lodge's foundation in 2019.
- The galaxy and stars – Represent the infinite nature of the cosmos and the universality of Freemasonry. Each star can symbolize a Brother or Sister under a shared sky.
- Square and Compasses – The central symbols of Freemasonry, denoting moral guidance, balance, and the tools for building a better self and society.
- The ship on water – Symbolizes the initiatory journey through the unknown toward knowledge and inner light.
- The waves – Evoke movement, life, and the constant transformation of the human spirit.
- "Grand Orient of Poland" – Signifies the Lodge's affiliation within a liberal Masonic structure known for its values of secularism, freedom of conscience, and human rights.

The seal combines traditional and cosmic elements, reinforcing the Lodge's commitment to open, inclusive, and philosophical Freemasonry.

== See also ==
- Grand Orient of Poland
- Continental Freemasonry
- Freemasonry in Poland
