= Symbolic Grand Lodge of Spain =

Spanish masonic organisation

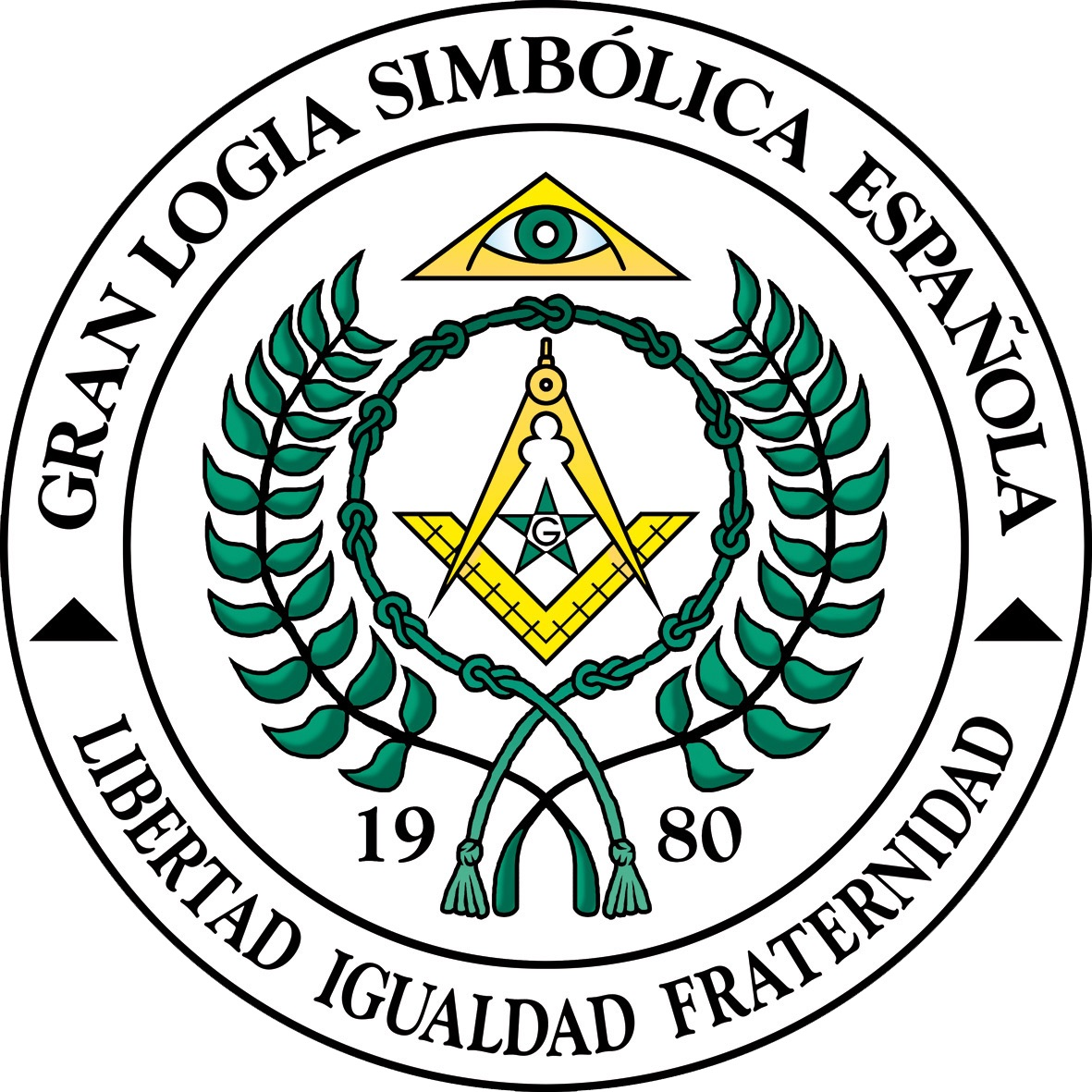
Emblem of the Spanish Symbolic Grand Lodge

The Symbolic Grand Lodge of Spain (Gran Logia Simbólica Española as per Spanish) is one of the main grand obediences (federations of several masonic lodges) in Spain. It is one of a group of obediences included in CLIPSAS, and can be defined as a mixed or egalitarian, liberal and non-dogmatic Grand Lodge.

== Membership principles ==
The GLSE belongs to the French or continental tradition of world Masonry. It differs from the English tradition, itself called “regular”, in that the latter obliges Masons to believe in a revealed god and in soul immortality; also, access by women is forbidden. As with many other Masonic organisations around the world, the GLSE does not embrace any of those two conditions.

An egalitarian organization, it accepts men as well as women to become members of its lodges, without any difference either in rights or in duties.

The organization embraces no dogma. GLSE members are not forced to be theistic or deistic; on the contrary, the GLSE considers that religious beliefs, or the lack of them, are part of every single mason's privacy. Therefore, the GLSE embraces the secularism, meaning that no one can impose their faith on the others and considering that defending a common and civil cohabitation space, a space in which all these beliefs, or the lack of them, may live together with equality, full freedom and with no privilege for anyone, is a critical matter.

The GLSE is liberally governed. There are no positions for life, and every representative is freely chosen by all Masons for a fixed period which is only to be renewed once.

== Affiliations ==
GLSE belongs to CLIPSAS as well as the Masonic Mediterranean Union (MMU), the European Masonic Alliance (EMA), the Contribution des Obédiences Maçonniques Libérales et Adogmatiques à la Construction Européenne (COMALACE). It is a founder of the Espacio Masónico de España (EME).

== History ==
After the end of the Francoist dictatorship, Freemasonry was pronounced legal again in Spain by a National High Court's judgement of 19 May 1979. This judgement set aside a decision of the Ministry of Interior (ruled by Rodolfo Martín Villa) intended to keep Freemasonry underground.

The Symbolic Grand Lodge of Spain was established the next year, on 15 May 1980. Its headquarters was built in Barcelona, at Avinyó Street. Its name comes from another Obedience established in Catalonia in 1920. The GLSE was created as a federation of lodges for men, as custodian and as representative of the identity signs and archetypes from Spanish historical freemasonry, since the GLSE embrace Spanish Grand Orient principles (a federation virtually extinguished after its persecution during Francoist Dictatorship).

Just as it had happened in London 263 years before, the GLSE included lodges which started out in secrecy even before Franco’s death. A number of GLSE’s sponsors became from European and American exile. Some of the first lodges were Minerva i Lleialtat, in Barcelona, Spain, founded in February 1977; Justicia, also in Barcelona, and shortly afterwards Hermes-Tolerancia, in Madrid. The first GLSE’s Grand Master (1980-1987) was Rafael Vilaplana Fuentes. From its beginnings, GLSE’s official masonic rite was the Ancient and Accepted Scottish Rite, although some years later French Rite was embraced too. In August of 2018 two more rites were incorporated: the Ancient and Primitive of Memphis-Mizraïm and the Emulation rite, of English origin.

Shortly afterwards, in 1983, GLSE was welcomed in the Centre of Liaison and Information of Masonic Powers Signatories of Strasbourg Appeal of 22 January 1961, or CLIPSAS. CLIPSAS is a liberal Freemasonry organisation. International relationships were held, from the beginning, with the Grand Orient of France, the Belgic Droit Human Federation, the Grand Orient of Belgium and the Grand Lodge of Italy. Close relationships were also held with the Lusitanian Grand Orient (LGO), in Portugal, from 1986 to today.

In 1990 the Symbolic Grand Lodge of Spain agreed to declare secularism as one of the key values.

=== Admission of women ===
Another decisive moment in GLSE history took place in 1992, under the command of the second Grand Master, Roger Leveder Le Pottier. In 1990, the discussion about “mixticity”, or women's admission, had already begun. This discussion was concluded at the General Assembly of 27 June 1992, held in Barcelona under the approval of a key amendment of the organisation's regulations. The GLSE has allowed, since then, mason women as members with full right and completely equal to mason men. This was called the “triple option”. The first woman entering in a GLSE's lodge was Josefina Saló. She was introduced in the Respectable Lodge Justicia #7, in Barcelona, on 14 November 1992.

In 2000, the first woman (Ascensión Tejerina) was appointed as a Grand Master. In 2012, Nieves Bayo, from Aragon, was also appointed as a Grand Master. Both of them were reappointed for a second command.

=== Intern and international consolidation ===
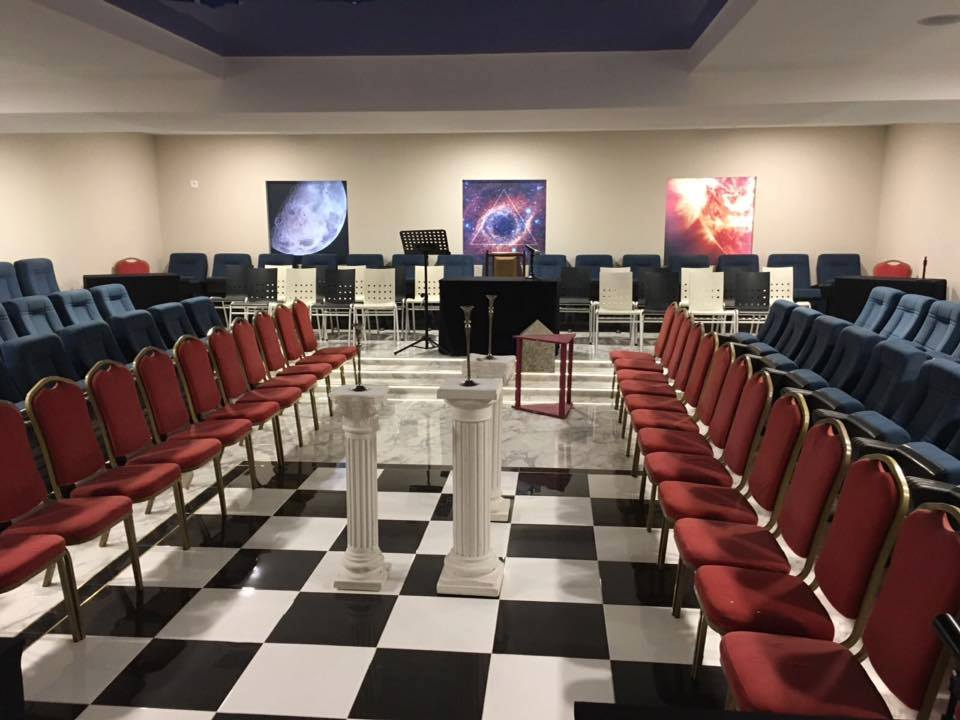
Roger Leveder's Temple, in the GLSE headquarters

In 1986, three years after being admitted to the organisation, the GLSE hold the CLIPSAS's Yearly General Assembly in Madrid, Spain, which led to the recognition of the Spanish masons’ international effort by world freemasonry. However, ultimate support to that effort came in 1998, when CLIPSAS met again in Spain (then, in Barcelona) and the fourth GLSE's Grand Master was appointed its president, Javier Otaola Bajeneta, Basque writer and lawyer. Otaola led CLIPSAS between 1997 and 1999.

Since then, the GLSE went on enhancing its relations with other obediences and masonic organisations all around the world. Currently, the GLSE maintains mutual recognition relations with 43 masonic obediences from Europe, Africa, Asia and America, and its footprint has reached every major forum in world freemasonry. In April 2005, the GLSE hold the Masonic Mediterranean Union (MMU) Meeting in Tarragona, Spain; and the GLSE did it again in Toledo, Spain, in 2016. Today, the UMM includes representatives from ten coastal countries and it works promote the dialogue, cohabitation and collaboration among all these countries.

On the 9 May 2009, during the Grand Master Jordi Farrerons's command, the GLSE was involved in the Espacio Masónico de España (EME) foundation, coordinating the four major freemasonic obediences with a footprint in Spain –the GLSE, Le Droit Humain, the Feminine Grand Lodge of Spain and the Grand Orient of France. On the 1 October 2016, the new GLSE's headquarters was established at Vallès Street, in Barcelona. The old temple in Avinyò Street was abandoned.

On October 29, 2019, Grand Master Xavier Molina presided the inauguration of the new and extensive Madrid headquarters, owned by the GLSE and located on the Belianes Street, in whose temples works Lodges of several Masonic organizations.

As of 2022 the Symbolic Grand Lodge of Spain includes 64 active lodges in four countries (Spain, France, Belgium and Sweden), in which more than 900 men and women work.

== Lodges affiliated to GLSE ==
- Respectable Lodge Minerva Lleialtat, #1 (Barcelona, Spain)
- Respectable Lodge La Luz #4 (Ghent, Belgium)
- Respectable Lodge Justícia #7 (Barcelona, Spain)
- Respectable Lodge Hermes-Tolerancia #8 (Madrid, Spain)
- Respectable Lodge Manuel Iradier, #26 (Vitoria, Spain)
- Respectable Lodge Obreros de Hiram, #29 (Seville, Spain)
- Respectable Lodge Resurrección #30 (San Roque, Cádiz, Spain)
- Respectable Lodge Amanecer #31 (Madrid, Spain)
- Respectable Lodge Descartes #35 (Barcelona, Spain)
- Respectable Lodge Lluis Vives, #37 (Valencia, Spain)
- Respectable Lodge Justícia VII, #38 (Barcelona, Spain)
- Respectable Lodge François Aragó #42 (Perpignan, France)
- Respectable Lodge Concordia-Barcino #43 (Barcelona, Spain)
- Respectable Lodge Arte Real #44 (Madrid, Spain)
- Respectable Lodge La Fraternitat del Vallès #45 (Terrassa, Barcelona, Spain)
- Respectable Lodge Miguel Servet #46 (Zaragoza, Spain)
- Respectable Lodge Indivisible, #51 (Valladolid, Spain)
- Respectable Lodge Altuna, #52 (Donostia/San Sebastián, Spain)
- Respectable Lodge Logos #53 (Palma de Mallorca, Spain)
- Respectable Lodge Iod del Maresme, #59 (Mataró, Barcelona, Spain)
- Respectable Lodge Manuel Fabra #60 (Castellón, Spain)
- Respectable Lodge Artesanos de la Luz #62 (Stockholm, Sweden)
- Respectable Lodge Luz del Norte, #63 (Bilbao, Spain)
- Respectable Lodge Renacimiento #64 (Madrid, Spain)
- Respectable Lodge Nueva Era 93, #65 (La Laguna, Tenerife, Spain)
- Respectable Lodge Mediodía #66 (Sevilla, Spain)
- Respectable Lodge Llum i Llibertat #67 (Tarragona, Spain)
- Respectable Lodge Bentayga, #68 (Las Palmas de Gran Canaria, Spain)
- Respectable Lodge Puerta de Oriente, #69 (Almería, Spain)
- Respectable Lodge Pedra Tallada #70 (Palafrugell, Girona, Spain)
- Respectable Lodge Odisea #71 (Jerez de la Frontera, Cádiz, Spain)
- Respectable Lodge Aurora #72 (Marbella, Málaga, Spain)
- Respectable Logia Lux Malacitana nº 74 (Málaga, Spain)
- Respectable Lodge Icària, #75 (Barcelona, Spain)
- Respectable Lodge Mariana de Pineda #76 (Granada, Spain)
- Respectable Lodge Galicia, #77 (A Coruña, Spain)
- Respectable Lodge Sapere Aude, #78 (Palma de Mallorca, Spain)
- Respectable Lodge Xavier Mina #79 (Pamplona, Spain)
- Respectable Lodge Obradoiro-Keltoy, #80 (Vigo, Spain)
- Respectable Lodge Ágora, #81 (Valencia, Spain)
- Respectable Lodge Ciència i Llibertat n2 82 (Sant Andreu del Palomar, Barcelona)
- Respectable Lodge Mediterrània nº 83 (Barcelona)
- Respectable Lodge Porta de Denderah nº 84 (Barcelona, Spain)
- Respectable Lodge Acacia nº 85 (Barcelona, Spain)
- Respectable Lodge Ariadna nº 86 (Sevilla, Spain)
- Respectable Lodge Sapientia-Ars Vivendi nº 87 (Salamanca)
- Respectable Lodge Siste Viator nº 88 (St.a Cruz de Tenerife)
- Respectable Lodge Atanor nº 89 (A Coruña)
- Respectable Lodge Librepensamiento n.º 90 (Zaragoza)
- Respectable Lodge Mitra n.º 91 (Murcia)
- Respectable Lodge Dos de Mayo n.º 92 (Las Rozas, Madrid)
- Respectable Lodge Liberación n.º 93 (La Línea de la Concepción, Cádiz)
- Respectable Lodge de las Artes y las Ciencias n.º 94 (Madrid)
- Respectable Lodge Maxorata n.º 95 (Fuerteventura, Canarias)
- Respectable Lodge Terre de Grenades nº 96 (Perpignan, Francia)
- Respectable Lodge El Olivo y la Acacia nº 97 (Jaén)
- Respectable Lodge Fraternité Universelle Hypatie nº 98 (Alicante)
- Respectable Lodge Gea nº 99 (Madrid)
- Respectable Lodge Cagliostro n.º 100 (Las Palmas de Gran Canaria)
- Respectable Lodge Hispanoamericana n.º 101 (Valencia)
- Respectable Lodge Migdia n.º102 (Castellón de La Plana)
- Respectable Lodge Antonio Machado n.º 103 (Sevilla)
- Masonic Triangle Arte Real-Toledo (Toledo, Spain)
- Masonic Triangle Luz del Alba (Guadalajara, Spain)
- Masonic Triangle Ágora II (Murcia)
- Respectable Lodge of Studies Theorema
- Respectable Lodge of Studies Heredom

== GLSE Grand Masters ==
1. Rafael Vilaplana Fuentes (1980–1987) †
2. Roger Leveder Le Pottier (1987–1993) †
3. Joan García Grau (1993–1997) †
4. Javier Otaola Bajeneta (1997–2000)
5. Ascensión Tejerina Hernández (2000–2006)
6. Jordi Farrerons Farré (2006–2012)
7. Nieves Bayo Gallego (2012–2018)
8. Xavier Molina Figueras (2018–2024)
9. Brenno Ambrosini (2024- )

== National and international organisations ==
The Symbolic Grand Lodge of Spain is affiliated with the following masonic organisations:

- CLIPSAS (Strasbourg Union)
- Masonic Mediterranean Union (MMU)
- European Masonic Alliance (EMA)
- COMALACE (Contribution des Obédiences Maçonniques Libérales et Adogmatiques à la Construction Européenne)
- Espacio Masónico de España (EME)

== Treaties of Amity ==
The Symbolic Grand Lodge of Spain signed Treaties of Amity and Mutual Recognition with the following masonic organisations:

=== Europe ===
==== Austria ====
- Grossorient von Österreich (2003)

==== Belgium ====
- Grande Loge Feminine de Belgique (GLFB) (2011)
- Grand Orient de Belgique (2009)
- Grande Loge de Belgique (GLB) (2014)

==== Croatia ====
- Grand National Lodge of Croatia (April 2017)

==== France ====
- Grande Loge Mixte Universelle (GLMU) (2006)
- Grand Loge Independante et Souverain des Rites Unis (GLISRU) (2007)
- Grand Orient de France (GOdF) (2008)

==== Greece ====
- Serene Grand Orient of Greece (1992)
- International Masonic Order “DELPHI” (2007)

==== Italy ====
- Gran Loggia d’Italia (2004)

==== Luxembourg ====
- Grand Orient of Luxembourg (2013)

==== Portugal ====
- Grande Oriente Lusitano (1990)
- Symbolic Grand Lodge of Portugal (2014)
- Symbolic Grand Lodge of Lusitania (June 2017)

==== Poland ====
- Grand Orient of Poland (November 2017)

==== Romania ====
- Grande Loge Féminine de Roumanie (2005)

==== Slovenia ====
- Grand Orient of Slovenia (April 2017)

==== Spain ====
- Freemasonry Supreme Council for Spain (SCME) (2003)
- Feminine Grand Lodge of Spain (2008)
- International Order of Freemasonry Le Droit Humain (2011)
- General Grand Chapter of Spain (2011)

==== Switzerland ====
- Grand Orient de Suisse (2014).

==== Turkey ====
- Grand Lodge of Free and Accepted Masons of Turkey (2006)

=== Africa ===
==== Congo ====
- Grands Orient et Loge Associés du Congo (2000)

=== America ===
==== Argentina ====
- Federal Grand Orient of the Republic of Argentina (2008)

==== Brazil ====
- Soberana Grande Loja Arquitetos de Aquário (1997)
- Grande Loja Maçónica Mista do Brasil (2002)

==== Canada ====
- Grande Loge Nationale du Canada (1996)

==== Chile ====
- Mixed Grand Lodge of Chile (2008)

==== Colombia ====
- Federación Colombiana de Logias Masónicas (2008)
- Symbolic Grand Lodge of Colombia (2011)

==== Ecuador ====
- Gran Oriente Latinoamericano (GOLA) (2007)

==== Peru ====
- Constitutional Grand Lodge of Peru (2008)

==== United States of America ====
- Spanish-Language Grand Lodge for the Americas (1992)
- George Washington Union Grand Lodge (2003)
- Grande Loge Haitienne de St. Jean des Orients d’Outremer (2003)
- Grand Orient of United States of America (2010)

==== Uruguay ====
- Gran Oriente de la Francmasonería Mixta Universal de Uruguay (GOFMU) (2008)

=== Mediterranean ===
==== Lebanon ====
- Grand Loge Unie du Liban (2010).
- Grand Unified Lebanese Lodge (April 2017)

Malta:

- Sovereign Grand Lodge of Malta (August 2017)

==== Marocco ====
- Grande Loge du Maroc (2011)
- Grande Loge Féminine du Maroc (2014)

=== Asia ===
==== Philippines ====
- Gran Logia Soberana del Archipielago (2025)
