= Grand Orient of Poland =

Masonic grand lodge

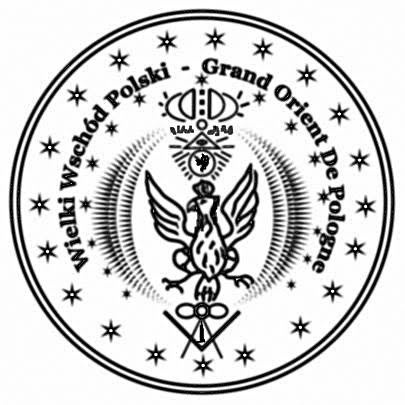
- Seal of the Grand Orient of Poland
- Established: 26 February 1784
- Location: Poland
- Region served: Poland
- Website: wielkiwschod.pl

The Grand Orient of Poland (Polish: Wielki Wschód Polski) is a Masonic grand lodge in Poland. It is a member of the European Masonic Association (EMA/AME), in the continental or liberal branch of Freemasonry.

Grand Orient of Poland was established on February 26, 1784 on the basis of a patent granted by the Grand Orient of France. In its first phase of his functioning, it was active until the beginning of the 19th century, when Freemasonry in the Polish lands occupied by The Russian Empire (under Russian partition) at that time was forbidden by the Russian Tsar.

At the beginning of the twentieth century, there were attempts to revive it by two progressive lodges of the Grand Orient of France operating in eastern Poland, but Grand Orient of France actually did it only in 1990 when its Lodge Victor Schoelcher set up the Polish Lodge "Liberty Restored" (La Liberté Recouvrée), which then, in 1997 became the main lodge of the restored Grand Orient of Poland. At that time the Grand Orient of France gave it a renewed founding patent and new patents for the French Rite, the Ancient and Accepted Scottish Rite, and the Scottish Rectified Rite. The Grand Orient of Poland is registered as an association in the provincial court in Warsaw on November 14, 1997 (KRS no. 0000120900, reference number WA.XII NS-REJ.KRS / 87318/16/404).

The first grandmaster of the reconstructed Grand Orient of Poland was the internationally known Polish philosopher and writer Andrzej Nowicki.

It is different from the Polish National Grand Lodge (Wielka Loża Narodowa Polski). The Grand Orient of Poland should also not be confused with so-called "Grand Orient of the Republic of Poland" - an unofficial association established in unclear circumstances on 25 February 2017.

== Lodges of the Grand Orient of Poland ==
1. Wolność Przywrócona ('Restored Liberty') (Warsaw) – French Rite
2. Galileusz (Bydgoszcz) – Scottish Rite
3. Cezary Leżeński (Warsaw) – Scottish Rite
4. Moria (Riga/Latvia) – Scottish Rite
5. Witelon (a travelling lodge) – Scottish Rite
6. Atanor (Warsaw) – Scottish Rite
7. Abraxas under the Light of Sirius (Warsaw/Poznań) – Rite of Memphis-Misraim
8. Universe (English speaking lodge) (Warsaw) – French Rite
9. Astrolabe (Kraków) – Scottish Rite
10. Synergy (Europe) – French Rite and Scottish Rite
11. Falcon and Owl (Poznań) – Scottish Rite
12. Pyramid of North (Toruń) – Scottish Rite
13. Free Plowmen (Lublin) – Scottish Rite
14. Three Compasses (Szczecin) – Scottish Rite
15. Fosforos (Wrocław) – Scottish Rite
16. Eye of Horus (Wrocław) – Scottish Rite

== International Cooperation ==
Based on mutual agreements of friendship and cooperation, the Grand Orient of Poland cooperates internationally with following organisations and Orders:

1. Grand Orient of France
2. Grand Orient of Switzerland
3. Grand Lodge of Italy
4. Grand Orient of Romania
5. Grand Orient of Ireland
6. Grand Lodge Lemuria (Mauritius)
7. Traditional Masonic Order - Mauritius
8. Grand Orient of Slovenia
9. International Masonic Order DELPHI - Greece
10. Grand Orient of Belgium
11. Grand National Lodge of Croatia
12. Grande Loge Féminine de France
13. Symbolic Grand Lodge of Spain
14. Grand Orient of Bulgaria
15. Grand Orient of Austria
16. Grand Orient of Estonia
17. Grande Loja Feminina de Portugal
18. Grande Loge Indépendante et Souveraine des Rites Unis
19. Grand Orient of Portugal
20. LIBERTAS International Grand Lodge of Freemasons for Women and Men
21. Grand Lodge of Cultures and Spirituality
22. Sovereign Grand Lodge of the Philippine Archipelago

The Grand Orient of Poland is also represented in international organisations:

1. European Masonic Alliance (founding member)
2. Adogmatic Association Central and Eastern Europe
3. Universal League of Freemasons
