= List of Masonic Grand Lodges in South America =

This is a list of all verifiable organizations that claim to be a Masonic Grand Lodge in Central and South America.

== Central and South America ==
| Country | State or Other Geographical Area | Grand Lodge Name | Founded | Lodges | Members | External Organizations |
|---|---|---|---|---|---|---|
| Continental | | Gran Oriente Latinoamericano (formerly Grande Oriente de Chile no Exílio) | 1984 | | | CLIPSAS |
| Argentina | | Gran Logia de la Argentina de Libres y Acceptados Masones (Grand Lodge of Argentina) | 1857 | 208 | 4,500 | CMI |
| Bolivia | | Gran Logia de Bolivia (GLB) (Grand Lodge of Bolivia) | 1929 | 81 | 4,600 | CMI, (CMB) |
| Bolivia | | Gran Logia Femenina de Bolivia (GLFB) (Women's Grand Lodge of Bolivia) | 2007 | 6 | 1,000 | CLIPSAS |
| Brazil | | Grande Oriente do Brasil (Grand Orient of Brasil) | 1822 | 2,652 | 81,277 | CMI |
| Brazil | | Grande Loja Maçonica Mista do Brasil | | | | CLIPSAS |
| Brazil | | Grande Loja Feminina do Brasil (Women's Grand Lodge of Brasil) | 2002 | | | CLIPSAS |
| Brazil | Acre | Grande Loja Maçônica do Estado do Acre (Grand Lodge of the State of Acre) (GLEAC) | 1973 | 18 | 762 | CMI, CMSB |
| Brazil | | Grande Loja Tradicional Do Brasil | 2019 | 10 | | CMSA CGLEM |
| Brazil | Alagoas | Grande Loja Maçônica do Estado de Alagoas (Grand Lodge of the State of Alagoas) | 1959 | 20 | 450 | CMI, CMSB |
| Brazil | Amapá | Grande Loja Maçônica do Amapá (Grand Lodge of the State of Amapa) (GLOMAP) | 1988 | 9 | 308 | CMI, CMSB |
| Brazil | Amazonas | Grande Loja Maçônica do Amazonas (Grand Lodge of Amazonas) (GLOMAM) | 1904 | 40 | 4,484 | CMI, CMSB |
| Brazil | Bahia | Grande Loja Maçônica do Estado da Bahia (Grand Lodge of the State of Bahia) | 1927 | 165 | 6,640 | CMI, CMSB |
| Brazil | Ceará | Grande Loja Maçônica do Estado da Ceará (Grand Lodge of the State of Ceara) | 1928 | 169 | 5,040 | CMI, UGLE, CMSB |
| Brazil | Distrito Federal | Grande Loja Maçônica do Distrito Federal (Grand Lodge of the Federal District) | 1963 | 38 | 1,000 | CMSB |
| Brazil | Espirito Santo | Grande Loja Maçônica do Estado do Espirito Santo (Grand Lodge of the State of Espirito Santo) (GLMEES) | 1970 | 98 | 7,511 | CMI, CMSB |
| Brazil | Goiás | Grande Loja Maçônica do Estado de Goiás (Grand Lodge of the State of Goiás) | 1951 | 115 | 2,936 | CMI, CMSB |
| Brazil | Maranhão | Grande Loja Maçônica do Estado do Maranhão (Grand Lodge of the State of Maranhão) (GLEMA) | 1960 | 46 | 1,190 | CMI, CMSB |
| Brazil | Mato Grosso | Grande Loja Maçônica do Estado de Mato Grosso (Grand Lodge of the State of Mato Grosso) | 1978 | 84 | 2,281 | CMI, CMSB |
| Brazil | Mato Grosso do Sul | Grande Loja Maçônica do Estado de Mato Grosso do Sul(Grand Lodge of the State of Mato Grosso do Sul) | 1962 | 61 | 2,475 | CMI, CMSB |
| Brazil | Minas Gerais | Grande Loja Maçônica de Minas Gerais (Grand Lodge of Minas Gerais) | 1927 | 303 | 9,889 | CMI, CMSB |
| Brazil | Minas Gerais | Grande Oriente de Minas Gerais | 1944 | 196 | 9,500 | COMAB |
| Brazil | Pará | Grande Loja Maçônica do Pará (Grand Lodge of Pará) | 1927 | 66 | 2,200 | CMI, CMSB |
| Brazil | Paraíba | Grande Loja Maçônica do Estado da Paraíba (Grand Lodge of Paraíba) | 1927 | 46 | 1,696 | CMI, CMSB |
| Brazil | Paraná | Grande Loja do Paraná (Grand Lodge of Paraná) | 1941 | 151 | 4,601 | CMI, CMSB |
| Brazil | Paraná | Grande Loja Unida do Paraná | 1981 | | | CLIPSAS |
| Brazil | Paraná | Grand Orient of Paraná | 1952 | 92 | 2,800 | COMAB |
| Brazil | Pernambuco | Grande Loja de Pernambuco (Grand Lodge of Pernambuco) | 1932 | 43 | 1,030 | CMI, CMSB |
| Brazil | Piauí | Grande Loja Maçônica do Piauí (Grand Lodge of Piauí) | 1948 | 44 | 1,346 | CMI, CMSB |
| Brazil | Rio de Janeiro | Grande Loja Maçônica do Estado do Rio de Janeiro (A.F.& A.M.) | 1927 | 188 | 6,100 | CMI, CMSB |
| Brazil | Rio de Janeiro | Grande Oriente do Rio de Janeiro | 1974 | 65 | 1000 | COMAB CMI |
| Brazil | Rio Grande do Norte | Grande Loja Maçônica do Estado do Rio Grande do Norte (Grand Lodge of the State of North Rio Grand) | 1974 | 25 | 710 | CMI, CMSB |
| Brazil | Rio Grande do Sul | Grande Loja Maçônica do Estado do Rio Grande do Sul (Grand Lodge of the State of South Rio Grand) | 1928 | 207 | 7,158 | CMI, CMSB |
| Brazil | Rondônia | Grande Loja Maçônica do Estado de Rondônia (Grand Lodge of the State of Rondônia) (GLOMARON) | 1985 | 37 | 1,035 | CMI, CMSB |
| Brazil | Roraima | Grande Loja Maçônica do Estado de Roraima (Grand Lodge of the State of Roraima) | 1981 | 11 | 350 | CMI, CMSB |
| Brazil | Santa Catarina | Grande Loja de Santa Catarina (Grand Lodge of Santa Catarina) (MRGLSC) | 1956 | 106 | 3,223 | CMI, CMSB |
| Brazil | Santa Catarina | Grande Oriente de Santa Catarina (Grand Orient of Santa Catarina) (GOSC) | 1950 | 120 | 3,954 | CMI, COMAB |
| Brazil | São Paulo | Grande Loja Maçônica do Estado de São Paulo (Grand Lodge of the State of São Paulo) | 1927 | 663 | 22,037 | CMI, CMSB |
| Brazil | São Paulo | Grande Oriente de São Paulo (Grand Orient of São Paulo) | 1921 | 350 | 8,500 | CMB |
| Brazil | São Paulo | Grande Oriente Paulista | 1981 | 360 | 9,500 | CMI, COMAB |
| Brazil | São Paulo | Grande Oriente Independente de São Paulo | 2012 | 15 | 225 | |
| Brazil | Sergipe | Grande Loja Maçônica do Estado de Sergipe (Grand Lodge of the State of Sergipe) (GLOMES) | 1983 | 14 | 398 | CMI, CMSB |
| Brazil | Tocantins | Grande Loja Maçônica do Estado do Tocantins (Grand Lodge of the State of Tocantins) | 1989 | 27 | 686 | CMI, CMSB |
| Chile | | Grand Lodge of Massachusetts, lodges in Chile | 1853 | 3 | | A unit of the GL of MA, CGMNA |
| Chile | | Gran Logia de Chile (Grand Lodge of Chile) | 1862 | 226 | 11,450 | CMI |
| Chile | | Gran Logia Feminina de Chile | | | | CLIPSAS |
| Chile | | Gran Oriente de Chile (Grand Orient of Chile) | 1961 | | | CLIPSAS |
| Chile | | Gran Logia Nacional de Chile (National Grand Lodge of Chile) | 2010 | | | #SOGLIA |
| Colombia | Santander | Gran Logia de Los Andes (Grand Lodge of Los Andes) | 1972 | 9 | | CMI, CMC, CMB |
| Colombia | Barranquilla | Muy Respetable Gran Logia Nacional de Colombia-Barranquillia (National Grand Lodge of Colombia) | 1918 | 10 | | CMI, CMC, CMB |
| Colombia | Bogotá | Gran Logia de Colombia-Bogotá, D.C. (Grand Lodge of Colombia) | 1922 | 48 | | CMI, CMC, CMB |
| Colombia | | Gran Logia Escocista de Colombia (Scottish Grand Lodge of Colombia) | | | | CIGLU |
| Colombia | Occidental | Gran Logia Occidental de Colombia-Cali (Grand Lodge of Western Colombia) | 1935 | 22 | | CMI, CMC, CMB |
| Colombia | Cartagena | Serenisima Gran Logia Nacional de Colombia-Cartagena de Indias (National Grand Lodge of Colombia, Cartagena) | 1920 | 19 | 330 | CMI, CMC, CMB |
| Colombia | Oriental | Gran Logia Oriental de Colombia "Francisco de Paula Santander" (Grand Lodge of Eastern Colombia, "Francisco de Paula Santander") | 1945 | 7 | 115 | CMI, CMC, CMB |
| Colombia | | Gran Oriente de Colombia (Grand Orient of Colombia) | 1989 | | | CIMAS, CLIPSAS |
| Ecuador | | Gran Logia Equinoccial del Ecuador-GLEDE | 1979 | 44 | 1300 | CMI |
| Ecuador | | Gran Logia del Ecuador (Grand Lodge of Ecuador) | 1921 | 28 | 471 | CMI |
| Ecuador | | Gran Logia Mixta de los Andes Ecuatoriales | 2011 | 8 | 140 | GLMAE / GLMNAC |
| Paraguay | | Gran Logia Simbólica del Paraguay (https://www.glsp.org.py/ Symbolic Grand Lodge of Paraguay) | 1869 | 92 | 3,120 | CMI / UGLE / WCRGL |
| Paraguay | | Gran Logia Simbólica del Paraguay (https://www.glsp.org.py/) | 2011 | 85 | 2.857 | |
| Perú | | Gran Logia de la República del Peru (Grand Lodge of the Republic of Peru) | 1882 | 183 | 4,508 | CMI |
| Perú | | Gran Logia Constitucional del Perú (Grand Constitutional Lodge of Perú) | 2005 | 13 | 357 | CLIPSAS |
| Uruguay | | Gran Logia de la Masonería del Uruguay (Grand Lodge of Uruguay) | 1856 | 108 | 4,750 | CMI |
| Venezuela | Puerto Cabello | Gran Logia Soberana de Libres y Aceptados Masones de Venezuela | 1918 | 14 | 250 | CLIPSAS, CIMAS, CCPOMA. |
| Venezuela | | Gran Logia de la Republica de Venezuela (Grand Lodge of Venezuela) | 1824 | 131 | 2,725 | CMI, CMB |

== See also ==
List of Masonic Grand Lodges
