= Sovereign Grand Lodge of the Philippine Archipelago =

Philippine masonic organisation

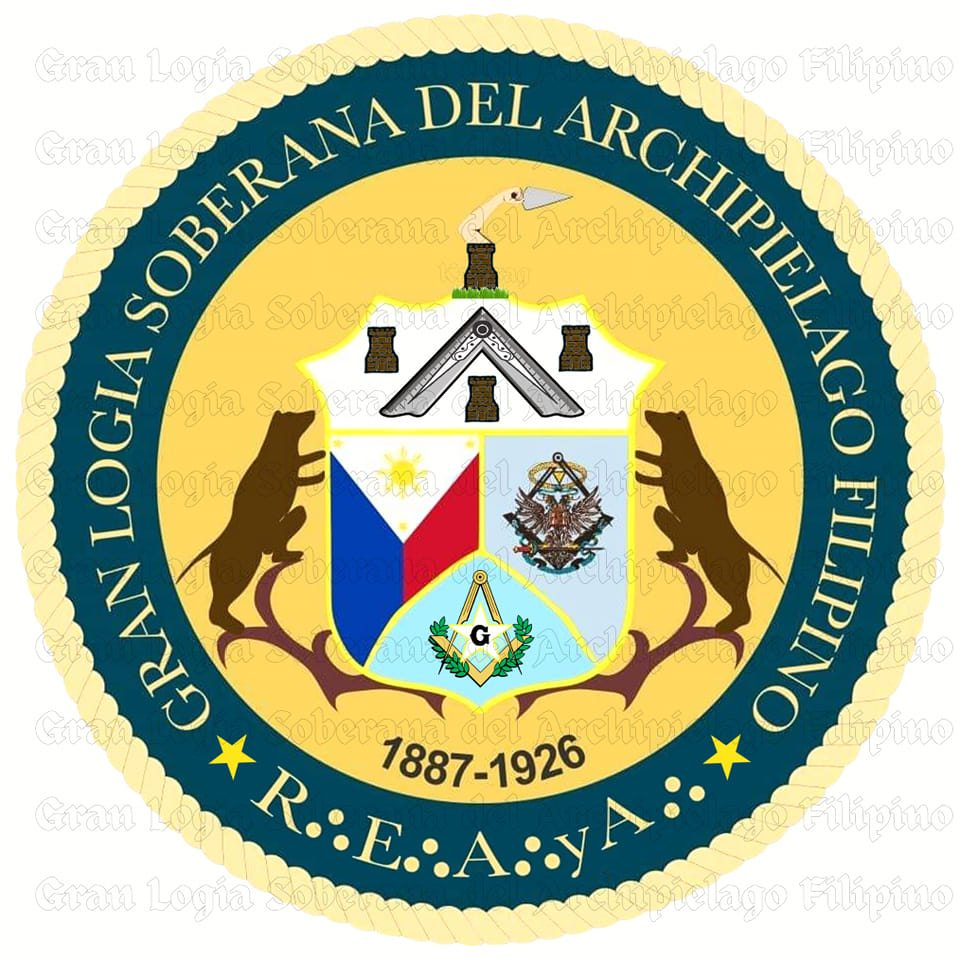
Logo of Gran Logia Soberana del Archipielago Filipino

The Sovereign Grand Lodge of the Philippine Archipelago (Gran Logia Soberana del Archipielago Filipino or GLSdAF as per Spanish) is one of the grand masonic obediences in the Philippines established in 1925, and traces its lineage as the direct and sole successor of the Grande Oriente Español. It is a member of the CLIPSAS, a major international organization for Liberal and Adogmatic Freemasonry worldwide, which was founded by prominent continental masonic obediences such as the Grand Orient of Austria, Grand Orient of Belgium, Grand Lodge of the Netherlands, and the Grand Orient de France, among others. The GLSdAF maintains amity and relationships with continental masonic obediences in Europe, such as the Gran Logia Simbólica Española.

== History ==
The history of the Gran Logia Soberana del Archipielago Filipino is deeply rooted in the introduction and flourishing of Spanish Masonry in the late 19th century. Early lodges under the Gran Oriente de España emerged by 1872, but the movement gained critical momentum after 1889, driven by the Hispanico-Filipino Association in Madrid dedicated to political reforms. The Grande Oriente Español (GOE) was pivotal, chartering the foundational Nilad Lodge in 1892 and overseeing the rapid growth to over twenty-four lodges by 1895. This success culminated in the organization of the Regional Grand Council in April 1893, led by prominent figures like Grand Master Ambrocio Flores and Grand Orator Apolinario Mabini. However, this period of development ended abruptly with the 1896 Revolution; Masons were violently persecuted, leading to the dissolution of most lodges and the execution of many brethren at Bagumbayan in 1897. Despite this "shipwreck," a few groups, notably the Modestia Lodge, persevered, maintaining the Spanish Masonic continuity and setting the stage for a limited revival, which included the election of Felipe Buencamino as Grand Master of a renewed Regional Grand Lodge under the GOE in 1907.

The formal quest for full Philippine sovereignty over the Spanish-rite tradition began shortly thereafter. In 1919, the GOE formally mandated the reorganization of its symbolic lodges and Scottish Rite Bodies, which resulted in the establishment of the Gran Logia Regional del Archipelago Filipino. This body served to revive the formal structure of the Spanish rite in the country. The final move toward independence was accelerated by an internal disagreement within the GOE's Philippine jurisdiction in 1924. This push for local control culminated in a decisive act of sovereignty in December 1925, when the GOE chartered the Gran Logia del Archipielago Filipino as "Soberana e Independiente" (Sovereign and Independent). This charter formally established a truly autonomous, self-governing Grand Lodge in the Spanish tradition, thereby creating the direct foundation for the present-day Gran Logia Soberana del Archipielago Filipino.

== Masonic Affiliation ==
The Sovereign Grand Lodge of the Philippine Archipelagi is affiliated with the following masonic organisations:

- CLIPSAS (Strasbourg Union)
