= Continental Freemasonry in North America =

Faction within Freemasonry

Continental Freemasonry in North America is relatively rare, but there are a few continental-style organizations active.

These organizations, often belonging to groups such as CLIPSAS, are not recognized by the Grand Lodges that form Anglo-American Freemasonry, including Prince Hall Masonry.

== History—differing Masonic traditions ==
Most American Freemasons belong to Grand Lodges that follow the Anglo-American Masonic tradition, which requires new candidates to have a belief in Deity, meaning that atheists are not allowed to join. In 1877 the Grand Orient de France (GOdF) dropped this requirement and the United Grand Lodge of England (UGLE) withdrew its recognition. Many masons believe that this caused the American Grand lodges to follow UGLE and withdraw recognition. However, the historical facts are more complicated. Several American Grand Lodges had withdrawn their recognition of GOdF as early as the 1860s, as the result of a jurisdictional dispute that had nothing to do with the change in the GOdF's stance on religion or the Bible in the lodge. Furthermore, during the First World War a half-century later, several American Grand Lodges briefly reinstated their recognition of the GOdF; this was "long after the GOF had changed its policy on religion, and the American grand lodges made detailed studies and were fully aware of the policies of the French bodies they were recognizing." The use of God as a tool for Masonic politics has a long history. Currently, none of the mainstream US Grand Lodges recognize GOdF.

=== Background on the belief in Deity ===
There is some debate as to exactly when Freemasonry in the Anglo-American tradition started requiring its members to have a belief in Deity. There are hints that this was the case from the earliest days of Freemasonry: The Regius Manuscript, the oldest known Masonic document dating from around 1390, states that a Mason "must love well God and holy church always." James Anderson's 1723 Constitutions state that "A Mason is oblig'd by his Tenure, to obey the moral Law, and if he rightly understands the Art, he will never be a stupid Atheist, nor an irreligious Libertine." Anglo-American Masons interpret this passage to mean that Atheists are barred from joining the fraternity, while Continental Freemasons disagree.

However one interprets Anderson's Constitution, it is important to remember that they only applied to the Grand Lodge of England. GOdF did not include this requirement in its original constitutions. While GOdF did add language that required belief in Deity in 1849, in 1877 GOdF changed it back to the original usage, without this requirement.

Whatever the historical rights and wrongs of the matter may be, the reasons for the disharmony between these two Masonic factions in the present day is primarily centered on whether a belief in Deity is required, although there is also disagreement as to whether women's Masonic groups can be recognized.

Today, the Grand Orient de France believes in Laïcité, which "imposes that all men are given, without distinction of class, origine or denomination, the means to be themselves, to have the freedom of choice, to be responsible for their own maturity and masters of their destiny."

=== The other French bodies ===
Complicating the issue of recognition is the fact that, in addition to the Grand Orient, there are at least twelve other Grand bodies in France, the two largest being: the Grand Lodge of France (GLF), and the Grand Lodge National of France (GLNF). The Grand Lodge National of France follows the Anglo-American tradition and is recognized by the mainstream American Lodges. The Grand Lodge of France falls between the Anglo-American and Continental traditions, though it allows atheists to join its own ranks and maintains relations with bodies that are considered irregular. For these and other reasons, it is also not currently recognized by any of the mainstream American Grand Lodges but were during the twentieth century recognized, or visitations were approved, by up to twenty-three of the US mainstream Grand Lodges.

The willingness of the Grand Lodge of France to recognize both sides in the larger Masonic Schism means that it is often the first to recognize small splinter groups that form out of both traditions. GLF can be seen as being the leader of a third faction in the larger Masonic schism, but is often grouped within the Continental Tradition by those in the Anglo-American tradition. As of 2010, there are no Masonic bodies that fall into this third grouping in North America, but there have been some in the past.

== Organizations ==
The Women's Grand Lodge of Belgium, the Grand Orient de France and the Women's Grand Lodge of France have lodges in North America.

The Grande Loge Nationale du Canada, which is a member of CLIPSAS, has 15 lodges, mostly in Québec and Montréal.

In Mexico there is the Spanish-speaking Grand Orient of Mexico (also a member of CLIPSAS).

There are several English-speaking groups that belong to the Continental tradition.

=== George Washington Union ===
The George Washington Union began as a single lodge, named "George Washington No.1", on December 10, 1976, to work under the concept of absolute freedom of conscience. The newly established Lodge received its Charter from the Grand Orient de France in accord with a covenant signed in August 1977 and ratified by the General Assembly of the Grand Orient de France in September 1978. In 1979, this lodge joined the Centre de Liaison et d'Information des Puissances maçonniques Signataires de l'Appel de Strasbourg (CLIPSAS). It was refounded in 1996.

By 2001 several other Continental-style lodges had been formed in North America. It was deemed appropriate in 2002 that the Grand Orient de France officially recognize and collaborate with the George Washington Union as a separate Grand Orient operating in North America with the ability to charter lodges.

=== Le Droit Humain ===
The International Order of Freemasonry for Men and Women Le Droit Humain, is a fraternal brotherhood that has many Federations and Jurisdictions worldwide. The Order has its headquarters in Paris. Every country works the Ancient and Accepted Scottish Rite, from the 1st to the 33rd degree.

The first Le Droit Humain Lodge in America was founded in 1903.

=== The Honorable Order of Universal Co-Masonry ===
Splitting from Le Droit Humain in 1994, Universal Co-Masonry works the Universal Rite, a combination of Scottish and English Rite Freemasonry. Founded in 1903 in the United States as The American Federation of Le Droit Humain, Universal Co-Masonry was originally called American Co-Masonry, but after the split in 1994 and after expanding outside the United States in the 1990's and 2000's the name Universal Co-Masonry was adopted in 2017.
