= Grand Constitutional Lodge of Peru =

- Established: 1882; 144 years ago
- Location: Peru
- Region served: Peru

The Grand Constitutional Lodge of Peru (Spanish: Gran Logia Constitucional del Perú) is a Masonic Grand Lodge that is in the tradition of Continental Freemasonry and is a member of CLIPSAS.
