= The Book of the Law (disambiguation) =

The Book of the Law is the central sacred text of the religious philosophy, Thelema.

The Book of the Law may also refer to:

- Canon of Laws, also known as the "Book of Law", a lost Chinese legal code
- Torah, the portion of the Hebrew Bible containing Jewish law
- Volume of Sacred Law, the religious or philosophical text displayed during a Masonic Lodge meeting.
