= Freemasonry in Malta =

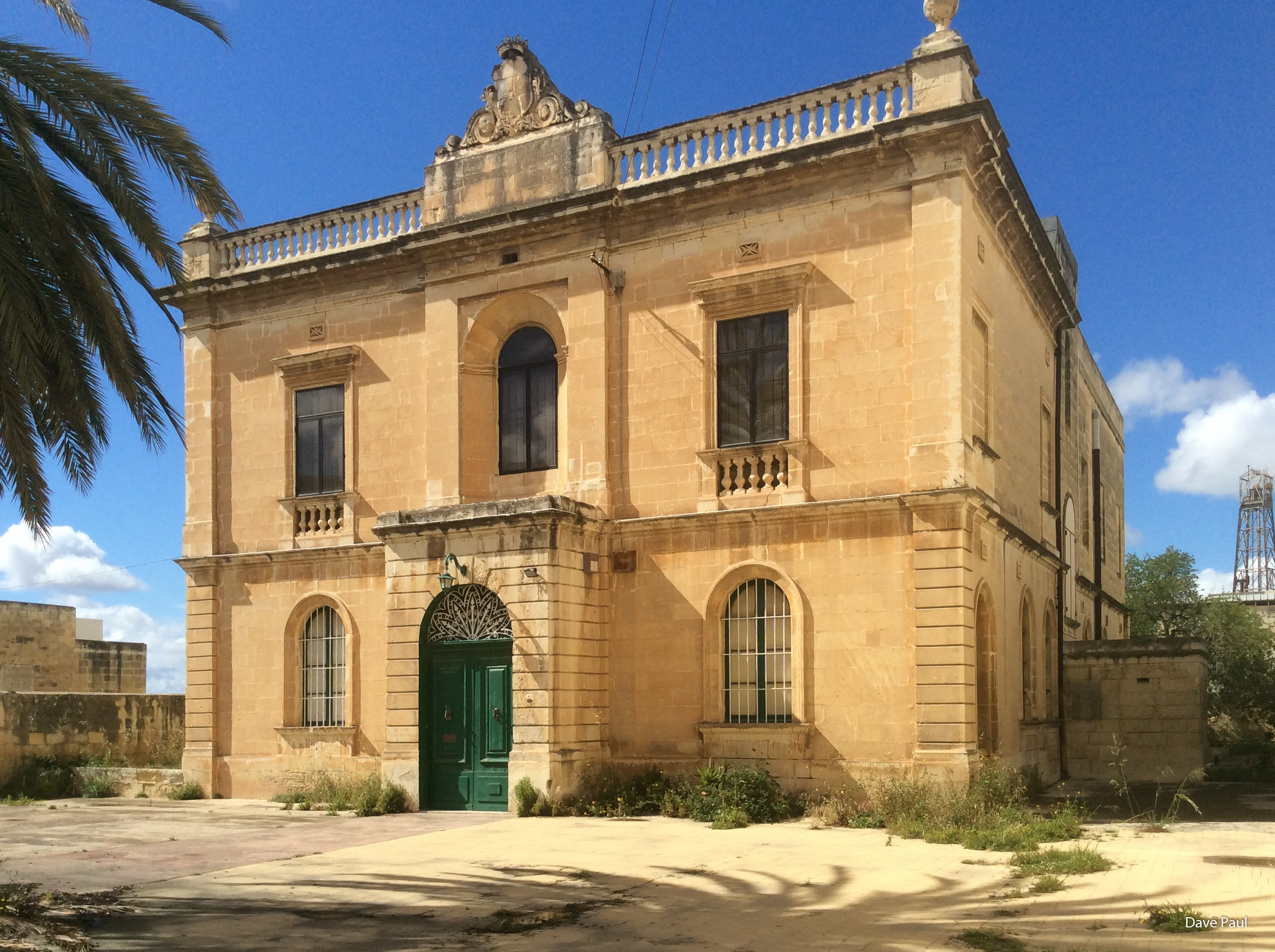
Villa Blye, a masonic lodge in Paola

Freemasonry in Malta has a lengthy history dating from the eighteenth century. The main masonic influences (and external supervision) have been from the United Grand Lodge of England, the Grand Lodge of Scotland, and the Grand Lodge of Ireland. Today Regular Freemasonry is under the jurisdiction of the English Constitution since 1815, the Sovereign Grand Lodge of Malta, which was formed in 2004 as well as the Grand Lodge of Scotland.

Another self-styled, irregular masonic body going by the name ‘Grand Lodge of Malta’ exists (whose members broke away from the Sovereign Grand Lodge of Malta in 2009).

The Sovereign Grand Lodge of Malta is recognized internationally by a majority of the Regular masonic jurisdictions worldwide, whilst the Grand Lodge of Malta is recognized by only two jurisdictions worldwide, one of which is the Grand Orient de France, an irregular Grand Lodge that unlike Regular Freemasonry throughout the world, admits women as masons within its ranks.

== Early years (1730–1800) ==
=== First lodge and early influences ===
Freemasonry in Malta began in 1730 when "Parfait Harmonie", the first warranted lodge, was formed under the Marseille (France) masonic jurisdiction. By 1741, freemasonry was established firmly in Malta.

Many knights of the Order of St. John, and some of the Maltese nobility, were freemasons. Grand Master Manuel Pinto da Fonseca was a freemason, and others (including Grand Master De Rohan) are reported also to have been freemasons, and influential in the spread of freemasonry in Malta. The first Masonic lodges operated in Malta under French warrants generally obtained from Marseille, but under the guidance of Count von Kollowrat, the Scottish Lodge of St. John of Marseille petitioned the Grand Lodge of the Moderns in England to obtain an English warrant on 30 June 1788. This lodge noted in its petition that the most important members of the Order of St. John ranked amongst its membership. The lodge obtained an English warrant as the Lodge of St. John of Secrecy and Harmony. This lodge ceased to function sometime before 1813.

=== The French period ===
After the 1798–1800 French occupation of Malta, many French soldiers were incarcerated as prisoners of war. In 1811, they established a Masonic lodge named Les Amis en Captivite under a warrant from Marseille. In that same year, the lodge was attacked by rioters, following exhortations from priests that the freemasons were responsible for the prevailing drought and disease stricken horses.

Following repatriation of the bulk of prisoners between April and August 1814, the lodge members were essentially non-French. On 6 October 1819, the lodge obtained a warrant from United Grand Lodge of England (UGLE). The lodge was permitted to work in Italian. In 1820, the British Governor on the island, Thomas Maitland, suspended the lodge by reason of infiltration by the carbonari, an Italian secret society which purported to subvert Italian states. It nevertheless appears on the official list of UGLE up to 1824.

Although some evidence has been presented to suggest that Napoleon Bonaparte was a Freemason, including a masonic apron said to have been his, and annotated with his name and masonic dates, now owned by Columbia Lodge No 2397 (London), there remains considerable uncertainty over the question. Several French sources cite similar accounts of his initiation into freemasonry in Malta in 1798 in a French Regimental Lodge, probably Army Philadelphe Lodge, but the earliest of these sources dates to some years after the events described, and there is no extant primary source, such as a Lodge minute book or attendance register. A number of masonic scholars have explored the available evidence, but none has felt able to form a definite opinion for or against the evidence.

== Freemasonry during British rule (1800–1964) ==
Malta came under effective British control in 1800, and was formally part of the British Empire from 1814 until 1964. During this time organised Freemasonry developed in Malta.

Early in 1815, a petition for the creation of the Lodge of St. John and St. Paul was submitted to the United Grand Lodge of England (UGLE). The lodge’s warrant was signed by the Grand Master, the Duke of Sussex, on 27 November 1815. This lodge is the oldest English lodge that still meets on the island. From 1822 John Hookham Frere was a member of the Lodge, becoming its treasurer in 1823. He remained part of the organization until 1843.

By 1890 there were five lodges under English (UGLE) jurisdiction, with a total of 409 masons. All of the English lodges in Malta were organised into a District Grand Lodge in 1849, and thereafter had a local District Grand Master and District officers. By 1900 the number of lodges had increased to seven, with a total of 584 members; by 1919 there were 1,484 freemasons in Malta under the UGLE constitution.

During the same period of British rule there were three other regular lodges consecrated in Malta, two by the Grand Lodge of Ireland, and one by the Grand Lodge of Scotland.

== British Freemasonry since independence (1964–present) ==
=== English Constitution ===
On 21 September 1964, Malta gained independence. Following the withdrawal of British forces from the island, and the shutdown of the British naval base on 31 March 1979, a significant proportion of the active members returned to the United Kingdom. As a result, all but two of the English lodges were relocated to England; of the two lodges remaining in Malta, one was unable to survive and surrendered its warrant, leaving the Lodge of St. John and St. Paul No 349 (the oldest of the English lodges in Malta) still meeting on the island. In 1984, the English District Grand Lodge of Malta, having been relocated to England, was dissolved. Following the dissolution, UGLE appointed a Grand Inspector, a senior officer of the Grand Lodge with responsibility for supervising English Freemasonry in Malta. A further two English lodges were subsequently consecrated, taking the total to three.

At the formation of the new Sovereign Grand Lodge of Malta in 2004, each local lodge had to decide to remain under its home jurisdiction or join the new Maltese constitution. One of the three UGLE lodges became a founding lodge of the new Sovereign Grand Lodge of Malta, leaving two (Lodge of St John & St Paul No 349, and De Rohan Installed Masters Lodge No 9670) still under English jurisdiction.

=== Irish Constitution ===
During the colonial period, there were two Lodges warranted in Malta by the Grand Lodge of Ireland: the Leinster Lodge No 387 founded in 1851, and the Abercorn Lodge No 273 founded in 1899. Later, following independence, the Grand Lodge of Ireland warranted two further lodges: the Fenici Lodge No 906 in 1991, and Hospitalliers Lodge No 931 in 2004.

On the formation of the Sovereign Grand Lodge of Malta in 2004, all of these Irish lodges became founding members of the new Grand Lodge. As a result there is no extant Irish Freemasonry in Malta today.

=== Scottish Constitution ===
There is just one lodge in Malta under the jurisdiction of the Grand Lodge of Scotland. Lodge St. Andrew No 966 was founded in 1904, and has continued to operate since Maltese independence. It did not join in the formation of the Sovereign Grand Lodge of Malta in 2004, and still reports directly to the Grand Lodge of Scotland in Edinburgh.

Following recent reorganisation Lodge St Andrew No 966 was re-amalgamated within the District of Western Mediterranean officiated by a visit of the District Grand Master and delegation in 2025. The District of the Western Mediterranean has historically been centered around Gibraltar and includes all Scottish Constitution Lodges based there.

== The Sovereign Grand Lodge of Malta (2004) ==
On 5 September 2004, at a time of Maltese nationalist celebrations marking 40 years of Maltese independence, and 25 years since the closure of the British naval base, and in anticipation of the admission of Malta into the European Union, three of the four Irish Constitution lodges met together and resolved to form themselves into the Sovereign Grand Lodge of Malta.

This historic move was supported by one of the English (UGLE) lodges on the island, Count Roger of Normandy Lodge No 9285, and at a special meeting held on 30 June 2004 the lodge resolved to unite with the Irish lodges in the formation of the new Grand Lodge. The fourth Irish Constitution lodge also decided to participate.

Following these events, the Grand Lodge of Ireland, in consultation with the United Grand Lodge of England and the Grand Lodge of Scotland, acceded to the petition of the five lodges. On 18 November 2004, with the Grand Master of Ireland presiding, these 5 lodges were instituted and consecrated by the Grand Lodge of Ireland into The Sovereign Grand Lodge of Ancient Free and Accepted Masons of Malta (SGLoM).

The effect of having a Grand Lodge is that SGLoM has become the sovereign Masonic body for the Maltese islands, having inherent power and authority to form a Constitution as its fundamental law, and subject only to the Ancient Landmarks of Freemasonry to enact laws for its own government and that of its subordinate Lodges. The remaining lodges of other constitutions (two English and one Scottish) may continue to meet in Malta, but new lodges may be founded only by the SGLoM. For months, the representatives of the five founding lodges met and drafted a Book of Constitutions which was adopted at the constituting Grand Lodge Meeting on 18 November 2004.

The first Grand Master of the Sovereign Grand Lodge of Malta was Joseph Cordina. In April 2005, a research lodge was consecrated named Ars Discendi (Art of Learning), and in November 2005 the lodge Flos Mundi (Flower of the World) was consecrated. This latter lodge was intended to attract Maltese and Italian brethren and works in the Italian language. A further new lodge was founded in 2010, named White Sea Lodge. In April 2011 the lodge Mare Nostrum was consecrated taking the number of subordinate lodges to nine.

The Sovereign Grand Lodge of Malta follows the English and Commonwealth pattern of Freemasonry (as opposed to the alternative Scottish Rite, York Rite, and Swedish Rite styles). This means that Malta recognises the three degrees of Craft Freemasonry (Entered Apprentice, Fellow Craft, and Master Mason), plus the Order of Royal Arch Freemasonry, as collectively forming the whole of "pure ancient Freemasonry". As in England, Royal Arch Chapters may be formed in Malta (with the consent of the Grand Master) and each such Chapter must be attached to a warranted Lodge, and bear the same name and number as that lodge.

The Sovereign Grand Lodge of Malta is recognised by most regular Grand Lodges worldwide.

== The Grand Lodge of Malta (2009) ==
On 16 December 2009 a significant number of Maltese Freemasons belonging to Abercorn Lodge, Mikiel Anton Vassalli Lodge, and Logga Fenici withdrew their membership from the Sovereign Grand Lodge of Malta and established a new Grand Lodge of Malta. They contended that the Constitution of the Sovereign Grand Lodge had been significantly amended so that the Grand Master had been granted absolute powers. They also proposed to establish a masonic Supreme Council to have jurisdiction over the Grand Lodge, a practice which is considered irregular by the majority of the world's established Grand Lodges, including the 'home constitutions', or Grand Lodges of England, Ireland, and Scotland.

The Grand Lodge of Malta (2009) has been recognized by the Grand Orient de France, the Gran Loggia D'Italia and a number of other bodies practicing Continental Freemasonry, considered irregular by the Grand Lodges of England, Scotland, and Ireland. The new Grand Lodge has not been recognised by any of the Regular Masonic jurisdictions worldwide, all of which continue to recognise the Sovereign Grand Lodge of Malta (2004).

The Grand Lodge of Malta attracted newspaper headlines when Dr David Gatt (a Grand Chancellor of the body) was arrested by Maltese police and charged with a range of serious organised crime offences. He was acquitted in 2017 and all charges quashed<.

== Notable buildings and residences ==
Some notable residences used by the freemasons in Malta are Villa Blye in Paola, Casa Viani in Valletta, and Villa Sunshine in Ta' Xbiex.
