= Freemasonry in Turkey =

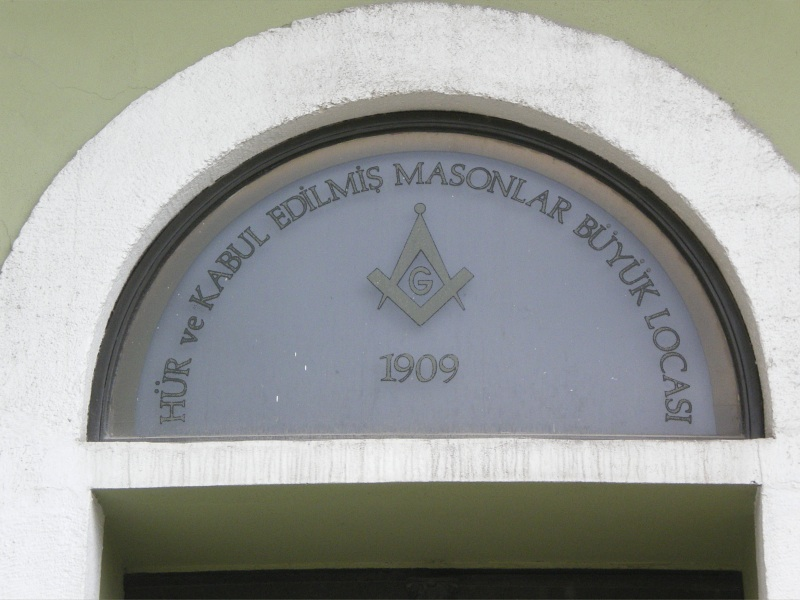
Window above the entrance of the building of the Grand Lodge of Turkey in Istanbul

The history of Freemasonry in Turkey stretches back to the 18th century under Ottoman imperial rule.

== History ==
=== 18th century ===
The first lodge in Turkey was probably established around 1721 in Istanbul by Levantines.

In 1748, Sultan Mahmud I outlawed Freemasonry in the Ottoman Empire and since that time Freemasonry was equated with atheism in the Ottoman Empire and the broader Islamic world.

=== 19th century ===
Freemasonry was legalised as a part of the Ottoman reforms in the 19th century.

Although Freemasonry in Turkey can be traced into the 18th century, for much of that time it was limited to lodges under the jurisdiction of foreign grand lodges, and there was no independent Turkish Grand Lodge probably due to illegality. This changed in 1856, when after it was legalised the first Turkish Grand Lodge was established. Sultan Murad V was a member of the lodge, becoming the first and only Ottoman sultan to join. Masonic organizations were among the most important organizations active from 1875 to 1908.

=== 20th and 21st centuries ===
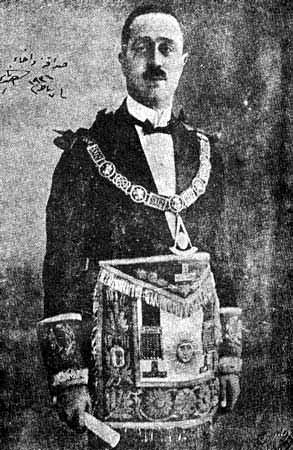
Ottoman damat Ahmed Nami Bey

The Grand Lodge came back in 1909 in Istanbul under a new administration. Because the Grand Lodge was used to operate in secret, it was banned in 1922, only to be re-established in 1925. In 1935, all Masonic lodges were banned on the ground that Masonic principles are incompatible with nationalistic policy. As a result of the repeated closures, the former Grand Lodge and its members were reluctant to support President Kemal Atatürk's reformist policies.

In 1956, the Grand Lodge of Turkey was re-established in its current form and, together with the light introduction in 1962, recognition was granted by the Grand Lodges of New York and Scotland. In 1970, the Turkish Grand Lodge was recognized by the United Grand Lodge of England and the Grand Lodge of Ireland as a regular lodge.

In 1964, after Süleyman Demirel wrote a public letter declaring that he was not a Freemason in order to win the nomination of the presidency of the Justice Party, a split occurred within the ranks of the Grand Lodge, resulting in the 1966 creation of the Grand Lodge of Liberal Freemasons of Turkey, which is a Continental-oriented body recognized by the Grand Orient de France, but not by the United Grand Lodge of England.

== Anti-Freemasonry ==
The history of Freemasonry in Turkey has also included the furthering of conspiracy theories by Islamists such as Adnan Oktar as well as Necmettin Erbakan and his movement Millî Görüş.

== Masonic organizations in Turkey ==
There are several Grand Lodges and Grand Orients currently operating in Turkey.

=== Grand Lodge of Free and Accepted Masons of Turkey ===
The Grand Lodge of Turkey (Turkish: Hür ve Kabul Edilmiş Masonlar Büyük Locası) is the largest Masonic Grand Lodge in Turkey, labouring in the three symbolic degrees of ancient Freemasonry. It was established in 1909 and consists of over 250 Lodges in 10 cities around Turkey; including 5 English speaking, 3 French speaking, 1 German speaking and 1 Greek speaking Lodges. As of 2020, it has around 17.000 members. Being in amity with 158 Grand Lodges around the world, the body claims that they are sole representative of regular Freemasonry in Turkey.

As a single-ritual jurisdiction, the Lodges on the roll of the Grand Lodge of Turkey uses the Turkish Ritual which stems from modern ritual of Scotland, as well as French and Schröder rituals. Almost all Turkish Lodges meet on a bi-weekly basis. With the exception of Lodges situated at the Aegean and Mediterranean coastal towns, two to three months summer recess is customary.

=== Grand Lodge of Freemasons of Turkey ===
The Grand Lodge of Freemasons of Turkey (Turkish: Özgür Masonlar Büyük Locası) was established in 1966 after a split from the Grand Lodge and follows the Continental Style of Freemasonry.
