= José Elias Garcia =

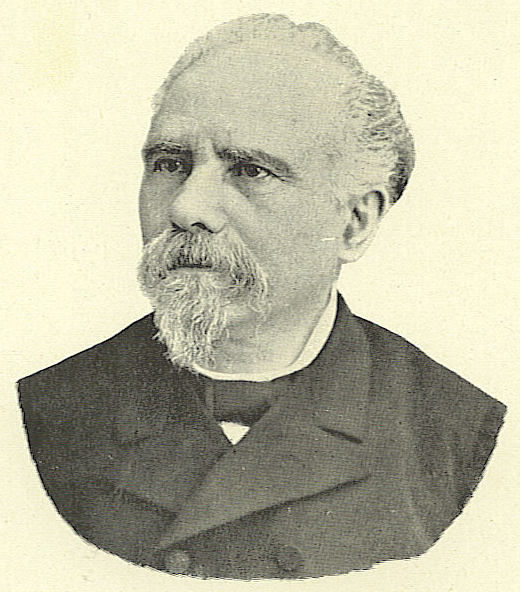
- Born: 31 December 1830; Cacilhas, Almada, Kingdom of Portugal
- Died: 21 April 1891 (aged 60); Lisbon, Kingdom of Portugal
- Occupations: Professor, journalist, military officer and politician
- Spouse: Maria Durán de Moura Pinheiro

José Elias Garcia (31 December 1830 – 21 June 1891) was a professor at the Army School, journalist, republican politician and engineering colonel in the Portuguese Army.

== Biography ==
=== Birth ===
Elias Garcia was born in Cacilhas on 31 December 1830. He was the son of José Francisco Garcia, head of one of the workshops at the Navy Arsenal, a constitutional revolutionary who was cruelly persecuted by the absolutist party, imprisoned and sentenced to death. He was in Limoeiro waiting to be executed when the Duke of Terceira's liberating army entered Almada and so miraculously, he left prison.

=== Marriage ===
Elias Garcia married Maria Durán de Moura Pinheiro, daughter of José de Moura Pinheiro and his wife Jacinta Durán Navarro, with descendants.

=== Work and career ===
In 1854 he founded the periodical O Trabalho, the first openly republican publication in Portugal. He was a councillor and in 1878 the Mayor of Lisbon, where an avenue bears his name. He was elected a Reformist Member of Parliament in 1870 and a Republican Member of Parliament in 1890.

He was director of the Association of Portuguese Journalists and Writers. He collaborated in the pedagogical magazine Froebel (1882–1884) directed by Feio Terenas.

A member of Freemasonry since 1853, he was the 1st and only interim Grand Master, later definitive, of the Masonic Federation between 1863 and 1869, 3rd and 5th President of the Council of the Order of the Grand Orient of Portugal from 1882 to 1884 and from 1887 to 1888 and 14th interim Sovereign Grand Commander of the Supreme Council of the Grand Orient of Portugal and 3rd interim Grand Master of the Grand Orient of Portugal from 1884 to 1886 and 16th interim Sovereign Grand Commander of the Supreme Council of the Grand Orient of Portugal from 1884 to 1886.

He was also acting Grand Master of the Grand Orient of Portugal from 1884 to 1886 and 16th Sovereign Acting Grand Commander, then permanent, of the Supreme Council of the Lusitanian Grand Orient and 5th Acting Grand Master, then permanent, of the Grand Orient of Portugal from 1887 to 1889.

== Death ==
Elias Garcia died on 21 April 1891, at the age of 60, in complete poverty, having sacrificed all his money in defense of his ideals, both by helping the Portuguese Republican Party and by financing Democracia Portuguesa, a newspaper he founded and which he greatly cherished, having constituted a privileged space for the dissemination of Republican and democratic ideals.
