= Volume of Sacred Law =

Masonic term for whichever text(s) are displayed during a meeting

Volume of Sacred Law (VSL) (also known as the Book of the Law) is the Masonic term for whatever religious or philosophical texts are displayed during a Lodge meeting.

== Background ==
In most jurisdictions, especially in lodges of Anglo-American Freemasonry, a Bible, Quran, Tanakh, Vedas or other appropriate sacred text will always be displayed as a VSL while the lodge is open. In Lodges with a membership of mixed religions it is common to find more than one sacred text displayed. In lodges associated with Continental Freemasonry, a Masonic constitution would be used instead as a VSL. Every candidate is given his choice of religious text for his Obligation according to his beliefs.

One of the most notable individual VSLs is the George Washington Inaugural Bible. It belongs to St. John's Lodge No. 1 in New York City and has been used at its meetings since 1767. It is famous for being the Bible used at the first inauguration of George Washington as President of the United States. It was also used (sometimes in conjunction with another Bible) for the Presidential inaugurations of Warren Harding, Dwight Eisenhower, George H. W. Bush, and Jimmy Carter.
