= Grand Orient of Portugal =

The Grand Orient of Portugal (Grande Oriente Lusitano) is a symbolic Masonic Obedience founded in 1802, thus being the oldest Portuguese Masonic Obedience. Its first Grand Master was Sebastião José de São Paio de Melo e Castro Lusignan, grandson of the first Marquis of Pombal, and his symbolic name was Egas Moniz.

The Grand Orient of Portugal belongs to the Masonic liberal current, proclaiming the absolute liberty of conscience and adogmatism.

== History ==
It was seen as a driving force in the anti-clericalism of the liberals. In 1921, it became a founding member of the International Masonic Association in alliance with the Grand Orient of France, Grand Orient of Belgium, Grand Lodge Alpina of Switzerland and the Grand Orient of Italy, amongst many others.

Opposing every form of oppression, the Grande Oriente Lusitano has faced throughout its history many moments of fierce persecution by the most conservative and reactionary wings of society. Amongst these moments, the prohibition during the Estado Novo dictatorship (law nº1901 dated May 13, 1935, proposed by José Cabral who had recently joined the single state-ruled party União Nacional, National Union, after leaving the Portuguese integralists and the national-syndicalists leadered by Francisco Rolão Preto) which forced Portuguese freemasons into clandestinity and often prison and political exile.

Fernando Pessoa, the renowned Portuguese poet, who assumed himself as a profane (or non-mason) published an article in Diário de Lisboa (Lisbon Daily, a daily newspaper) defending Freemasonry and specifically the Grande Oriente Lusitano. During clandestinity (1935-1974), the Grande Oriente Lusitano had its buildings confiscated and the Masonic Palace, in center Lisbon, occupied by the Legião Portuguesa (Portuguese Legion, a para-military political force created for the "defense of the State").

The Revolution of the Carnations on April 25, 1974 revoked law nº1901 and the Grande Oriente Lusitano could once more see the light of day and have its buildings returned.

== Rites ==
Under the auspices of the Grande Oriente Lusitano there are lodges of the Ancient and Accepted Scottish Rite and of the French Rite. These Rites are administered by the respective philosophical Potences with which the Grande Oriente Lusitano has a treaty to confer the symbolic degrees:

- Supreme Council of the Grand Inspector-General of the 33rd Degree of the Ancient and Accepted Scottish Rite for Portugal and its jurisdiction
- Sovereign Grand Chapter of the Cavaliers Rose-Croix - Grand Chapter General of the French Rite of Portugal

== Grémio Lusitano ==
The three potencies are represented in civil society through the Grémio Lusitano, a cultural, recreational and philanthropic society whose headquarters are situated at the Rua do Grémio Lusitano, number 25, in Lisbon. This building, the Masonic Palace, also hosts the Portuguese Masonic Museum, considered by many as one of the best of its kind in Europe. The Museum is open to the public.

== Grand Masters ==
- 1804 – 1809 – Sebastião de Sampaio de Melo e Castro
- 1809 – 1816 – Fernando Romão da Costa Ataíde e Teive de Sousa Coutinho
- 1816 – 1817 – Gomes Freire de Andrade e Castro
  - 1820 – 1821 – João Vicente Pimentel Maldonado (interim)
- 1821 – 1823 – João da Cunha Souto Maior
- 1823 – 1839 – José da Silva Carvalho
- 1839 – 1841 – Manuel Gonçalves de Miranda
  - 1841 – 1841 – Bartolomeu dos Mártires Dias e Sousa (interim)
- 1841 – 1846 – António Bernardo da Costa Cabral
- 1846 – 1847 – João de Deus Antunes Pinto
- 1847 – 1849 – António Bernardo da Costa Cabral
- 1849 – 1853 – Marcelino Máximo de Azevedo e Melo
- 1854 – 1861 – José Joaquim de Almeida Moura Coutinho
- 1861 – 1863 – Frederico Leão Cabreira de Brito Alvelos Drago Valente;
- 1863 – 1867 – Caetano Gaspar de Almeida e Noronha Portugal Camões de Albuquerque Moniz e Sousa
- 1867 – 1869 – José da Silva Mendes Leal
- 1869 – 1881 – João Inácio Francisco de Paula de Noronha
- 1881 – 1884 – Miguel Baptista Maciel
- 1884 – 1886 – José Elias Garcia
- 1886 – 1887 – António Augusto de Aguiar
- 1887 – 1889 – José Elias Garcia
- 1889 – 1895 – Carlos Ramiro Coutinho
- 1895 – 1899 – Bernardino Machado Guimarães
- 1899 – 1906 – Luís Augusto Ferreira de Castro
  - 1906 – 1907 – Francisco Gomes da Silva (interim)
- 1907 – 1928 – Sebastião de Magalhães Lima
  - 1928 – 1929 – Luís Augusto Curson (interim)
- 1929 – 1929 – António José de Almeida
  - 1929 – 1930 – Joaquim Maria de Oliveira Simões (interim)
- 1930 – 1935 – José Mendes Ribeiro Norton de Matos
  - 1935 – 1937 – Maurício Armando Martins Costa (interim)
- 1937 – 1937 – Filipe Inês Ferreira (interim)
- 1937 – 1975 – Luís Gonçalves Rebordão
- 1975 – 1981 – Luís Hernâni Dias Amado
- 1982 – 1984 – Armando Adão e Silva
- 1984 – 1988 – José Eduardo Simões Coimbra
- 1988 – 1990 – Raul de Assunção Pimenta Rego
- 1990 – 1993 – Ramon de la Féria
- 1993 – 1996 – João Rosado Correia
- 1996 – 2002 – Eugénio de Oliveira
- 2002 – 2005 – António Duarte Arnaut
- 2005 – 2011 – António Fernando Marques Ribeiro Reis
- 2011 – 2021 – Fernando Manuel Lima Valada Fernandes
- 2021 – present – Fernando José Correia Cabecinha

== See also ==
- CLIPSAS
- Afonso Costa
