= Anglo-American Freemasonry =

Branch of Freemasonry

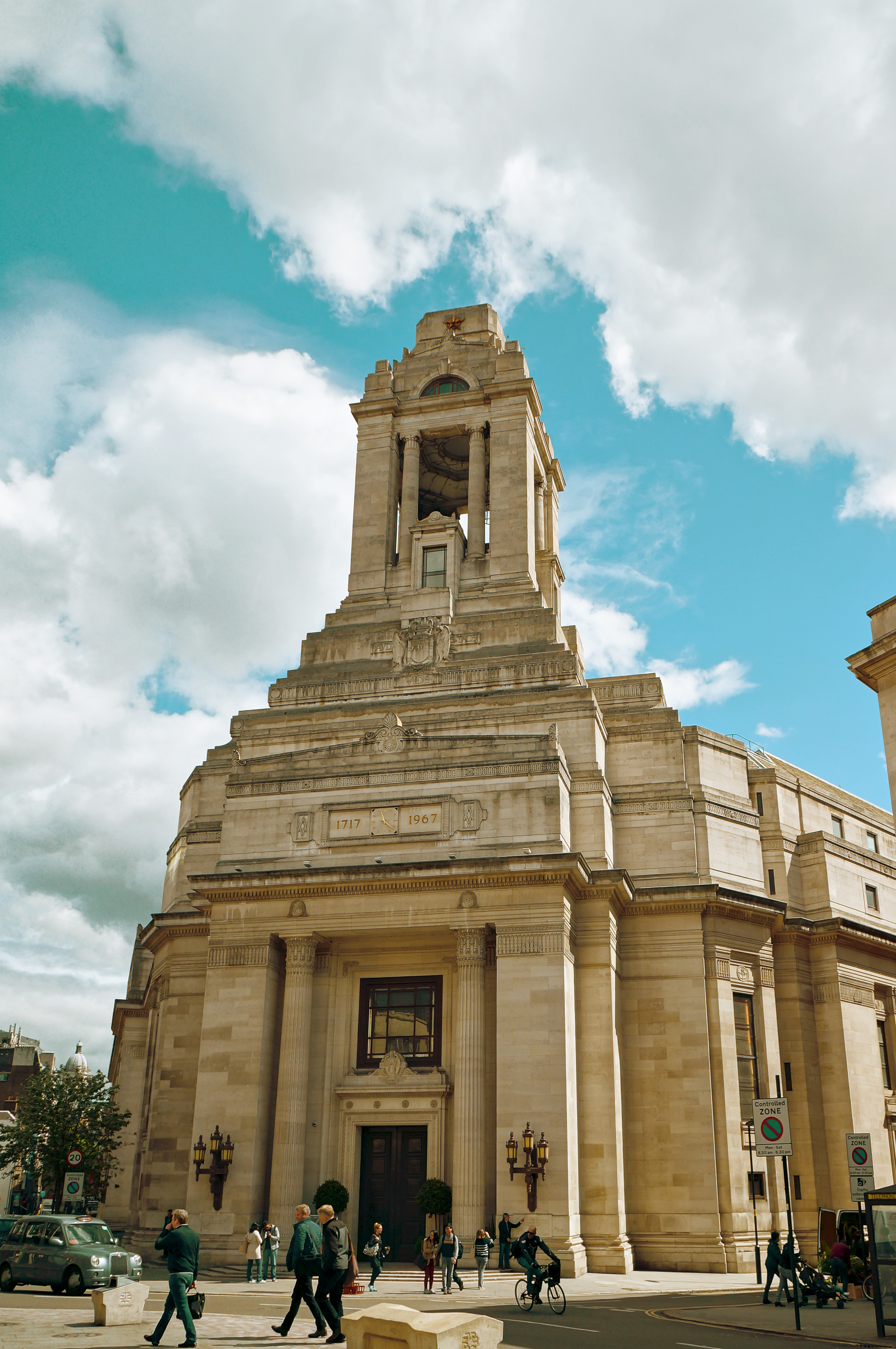
Freemasons' Hall, London, headquarters of the United Grand Lodge of England.

Anglo-American Freemasonry (also self-described as Regular Freemasonry) is a loose network of overlapping chains of mutually recognized Grand Lodges, forming a Regular Masonic jurisdiction. For the most part these trace their descent from one of "original" British Grand Lodges, with mutual recognition based on adherence to certain core values, rules and membership requirements (known as Landmarks).

== Different branches of Freemasonry ==
Freemasonry is often said to consist of two branches not in mutual regular amity:

- Anglo-American style, or Regular Freemasonry
- Continental style, or Liberal Freemasonry

The majority of Masonic jurisdictions around the world follow the Anglo-American style. The United Grand Lodge of England lists 194 Grand Lodges which it considers to be Regular and the Grand Lodge of New York lists 202 which it considers to be Regular, while the umbrella organisation for Liberal Freemasonry, CLIPSAS, lists 90 members. The Anglo-American style is especially dominant in the United States, and the countries that once formed the British Empire. It has a minority presence in France and most Latin American countries. The Anglo-American branch has several noteworthy sub-branches, most notably Prince Hall Freemasonry (a legacy of past racial segregation in the United States, and so predominantly found in that country). The Swedish Rite (which is exclusively open for confessors of the Christian faith, and has a significant presence in Scandinavia), although recognised by this branch of masonry, is best viewed as a separate rite.

The Continental Style dominates in France, and has a majority presence in several European countries and in most Latin American countries. It has a minority presence in other parts of the world.

There are three core issues that separate the Anglo-American Branch and the Continental Branch of Freemasonry:

Issue	Anglo-American	Continental
Belief in Deity	Requires its members to express a belief in Deity as a condition of membership.	Not a requirement, allowing atheists to join.
Female membership	Does not admit women as members. There are associated organisations in American Freemasonry which are open to women, but unrecognised in England or Ireland.	Open to female membership by means of mixed lodges, women-only lodges or amity with women-only bodies.
Political involvement	Strict ban of the discussion of politics in a lodge setting, and its Grand Lodges will not comment on political matters.	Allows political discussion, and its Grand Orients will often issue statements on political issues.
