= Grande Oriente Español =

The Grande Oriente Español (Spanish: Gran Oriente Español) is the oldest traditional Masonic body in Spain. It was founded in September 1889 by the unification of the Gran Oriente de España (GOdE) and the Gran Oriente Nacional de España (GONE).

Among its Grand Masters was Diego Martínez Barrio, prime minister of Spain and founder of the Republican Union. The Grande Oriente was a member of the International Masonic Association, which was under the influence of the Grand Orient de France.

== Grand Masters ==
=== Gran Oriente Nacional de España (1865–1887) ===
- Ramón Calatrava (1865–1876)
- Juan Antonio Seoane y Bayón (1876–1887)

==== Gran Oriente Nacional de España, presidido por Pantoja (1887–1896) ====
- José María Pantoja (1887–1896)

==== Gran Oriente Nacional de España en torno al Vizconde de Ros (1887–1893) ====
- Alfredo Vega y Fernández, vizconde de Ros (1887–)

=== Gran Oriente de España (1870–1889) ===
- Manuel Ruiz Zorrilla (1870–1874)
- Juan de la Somera (1874–1875)
- Práxedes Mateo Sagasta (1876–1880)
- Antonio Romero Ortiz (1881–1884)
- Manuel Becerra Bermúdez (1884–1885)

=== Unification (1889-1938) ===
- Miguel Morayta Sagrario (1889–1901)
- Emilio Menéndez Pallarés (1901–1904)
- José Marenco Gualter (1904–1906)
- Miguel Morayta Sagrario (1906–1917)
  - Antonio López de Villar (interim)
  - José Lescura Borrás (interim)
- Luis Simarro Lacabra (1917–1921)
- Augusto Barcia Trelles (1921–1922)
- Enrique Gras Morillo (1922–1923)
- José Lescura Borrás (1922–1923)
- José María Rodríguez Rodríguez (1924–1925)
- Demófilo de Buen Lozano (1926–1929)
- Diego Martínez Barrio (1929–1930)
- Diego Martínez Barrio (1930–1934)
  - Fermín de Zayas Molina (interim)
- Ángel Rizo Bayona (1935–1938)
