= Grand Lodge of Italy =

Masonic organization in Italy

The Gran Loggia d'Italia degli A.L.A.M. (the acronym stands for Antichi Liberi e Accettati Muratori), known in English as the Grand Lodge of Italy of the A.F.A.M. (the acronym stands for Ancient Free and Accepted Masons), is a Continental Freemasonic organization based at Palazzo Vitelleschi, in Rome. It was founded in 1910 as a schism from the Grand Orient of Italy. They are a member of the CLIPSAS, the international association of liberal Freemasonic jurisdictions. They were known popularly as the "Piazza del Gesù" Freemasons, due to their former headquarters at the Piazza del Gesù, 47 in Rome.

== Philanthropic activities ==
During the outbreak of the COVID-19 pandemic in Italy (2020), the Gran Loggia d'Italia degli A.L.A.M. made a €100,000 donation in favour to the Italian Red Cross.

== See also ==
- Grand Lodge
