= Centre de Liaison et d'Information des Puissances maçonniques Signataires de l'Appel de Strasbourg =

International Masonic organization

Centre of Liaison and Information of Masonic Powers Signatories of Strasbourg Appeal
- Centre de Liaison et d'Information des Puissances maçonniques Signataires de l'Appel de Strasbourg
- Abbreviation: CLIPSAS
- Formation: January 22, 1961
- Type: International Liberal Masonic organization
- Legal status: Active NGO with UN ECOSOC Special Consultative Status
- Purpose: To fight against dogmas and fundamentalism; Facilitate international Masonic cooperation; Defend Liberty, Secularism (Laïcité), and Tolerance; To fight against ambient pessimism
- Headquarters: Paris, France
- Members: 91 Masonic obediences
- Official languages: French, English, Spanish
- President: Louis Daly
- Main organ: General Assembly
- Website: clipsas.org
- Legal status: Association under French law of 1901

CLIPSAS (Centre de Liaison et d'Information des Puissances maçonniques Signataires de l'Appel de Strasbourg) (English: "Liaison and Information Center of Masonic Powers Signatories of the Strasbourg Appeal") is an international Masonic organization that serves as the primary coordinating body for liberal Masonic activities. CLIPSAS was established in 1961 through the Strasbourg Appeal as a more inclusive alternative to the United Grand Lodge of England. The organization maintains Special Consultative Status at the United Nations Economic and Social Council (ECOSOC) and comprises over 101 member obediences across four continents.

== History ==
The United Grand Lodge of England (UGLE) maintained strict requirements regarding belief in a Supreme Being and prohibition of political and religious discussions.

On January 22, 1961, several sovereign Masonic obediences convened in Strasbourg to address these challenges. The original signatories include:

- Grand Orient of Switzerland
- Grand Orient of Austria
- Grand Orient of Luxembourg
- Serenísima Gran Logia de Lengua Española
- Grand Orient of France
- Grand Orient of Italy
- Grand Orient of Belgium

== Presidents ==
Years	President	Obedience
1961–1962	Georges Beernaerts	Grand Orient of Belgium
1962–1964	Charles Castel	Grand Orient of Belgium
1964–1966	Walter Heinz	Grand Orient of Belgium
1966	Paul Van Hercke	Grand Orient of Belgium
1966–1970	Robert Dille	Grand Orient of Belgium
1970–1973	Victor Martiny	Grand Orient of Belgium
1973–1976	Pierre Burton	Grand Orient of Belgium
1976–1979	Jaak Nutkewitz	Grand Orient of Belgium
1979–1982	André Mechelynck	Grand Orient of Belgium
1982–1985	Nicolas Bontyes	Grand Orient of Belgium
1985–1987	Silvain Loccufier	Grand Orient of Belgium
1987–1990	Guy Vlaeminck	Grand Orient of Belgium
1990–1993	Jean-Robert Ragache	Grand Orient of France
1993–1996	Marc-Antoine Cauchie	Grand Orient of Luxembourg
1996–1998	Marie-France Coquard	Grande Loge Féminine de France
1998–2000	Javier Otaola Bajeneta	Grande Loge Symbolique Espagnole
2000–2004	Marc-Antoine Cauchie	Grand Orient of Luxembourg
2004–2007	Gabriel Nzambila	Grands Orients et Loge Associée du Congo
2007–2008	Jefferson Isaac João Scheer	Grande Loja Unida do Parana
2008–2011	Marc-Antoine Cauchie	Grand Orient of Luxembourg
2011–2014	António Reis	Grande Oriente Lusitano
2014–2017	Louis Daly	Grande Loge Omega de New-York
2017–2021	François Padovani	Grande Loge Mixte de France
2021–2024	Ivan Herrera Michel	Federacion Colombiana de Logias Masónicas

== Current Member Obediences ==
CLIPSAS includes over 101 member obediences as of 2024 but shrunk to 91 denominations after the 2024 General Assembly in Albania.

== Controversies and Criticism ==
=== Governance issues ===
During the 2022 General Assembly in Lisbon, Portugal, President Ivan Herrera Michel and the Grand Symbolic Lodge of Portugal reportedly had a lack of communication between members as many COVID-19 cases within the group were reported after the event. The organizers also used internet voting instead of using the usual voting system with terminals which led to confusion, notably when the voting for the inclusion of the Grand Orient of Andorra was reversed from their actual choice.

The assembly also had a reinstatement vote for the previously suspended Grand Orient of Mexico, in which the president reportedly left the room during vote to take a Covid PCR test for a flight.

=== Electoral Controversy of 2024 ===
During the 2024 General Assembly in Durrës, Albania, Louis Daly won the election with only 32.06% of votes. This led to immediate protests from multiple member obediences who argued Daly violated their regulations. Then president Michel declared him the winner, prompting more than 15 Obediences to abandon the group.

== See also ==
- Freemasonry
- Liberal Freemasonry
- Co-Freemasonry
- Grand Orient of France
- History of Freemasonry
