= Freemasonry and women =

Positions on women in the fraternal organisation

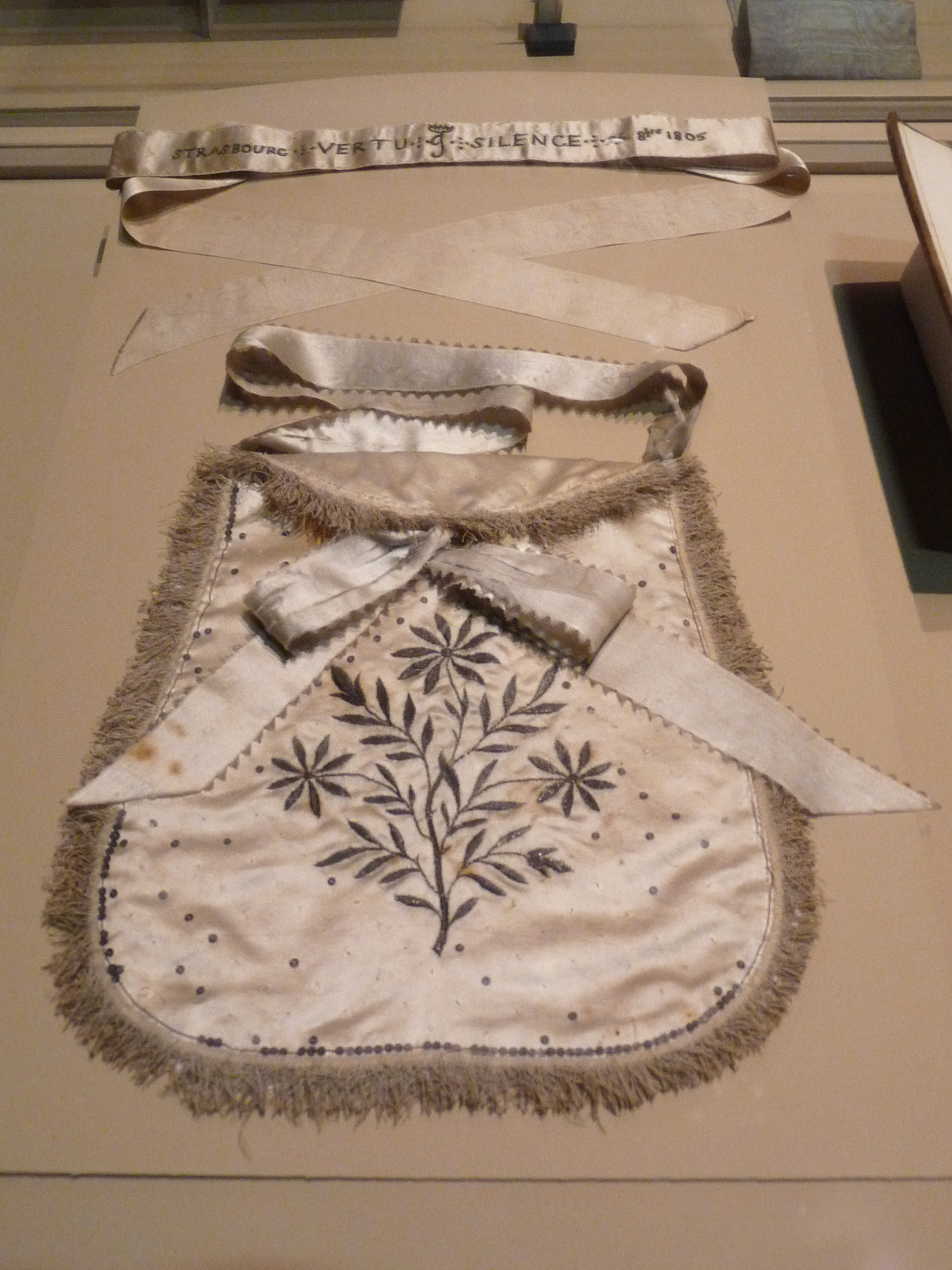
Apron and sash presented to the Empress Josephine on her admission to the Lodge of Virtue, Strasbourg, 1805

Freemasonry has had a complex, though primarily separate, relationship with women for centuries. A few women were involved in Freemasonry before the 18th century, despite de jure prohibitions in the Premier Grand Lodge of England.

The French Lodges of Adoption, which spread through Continental Europe during the second half of the 18th century, admitted Masons and their female relatives to a system of degrees parallel, but unrelated to the original rite. In the early 20th century, these were revived as women-only lodges and later they adopted male degrees giving rise to French women's Masonry in the 1950s.

18th-century British lodges and their American offshoots remained male only. In the late 1800s, rites similar to adoption emerged in the United States, allowing masons and their female relatives to participate in ritual together. These bodies, however, were more careful to discriminate between the mixed ritual and the Freemasonry of the men.

In the 1890s, mixed lodges following a standard Masonic ritual started to appear in France, and quickly spread to other countries. Women-only jurisdictions appeared soon afterwards. As a general rule, the admission of women is now recognised in Continental (Grand Orient) jurisdictions. In Anglo-American Freemasonry, neither mixed nor all-female lodges are officially recognised, although unofficial relations can be cordial, with premises sometimes shared.

== Women as operative masons ==
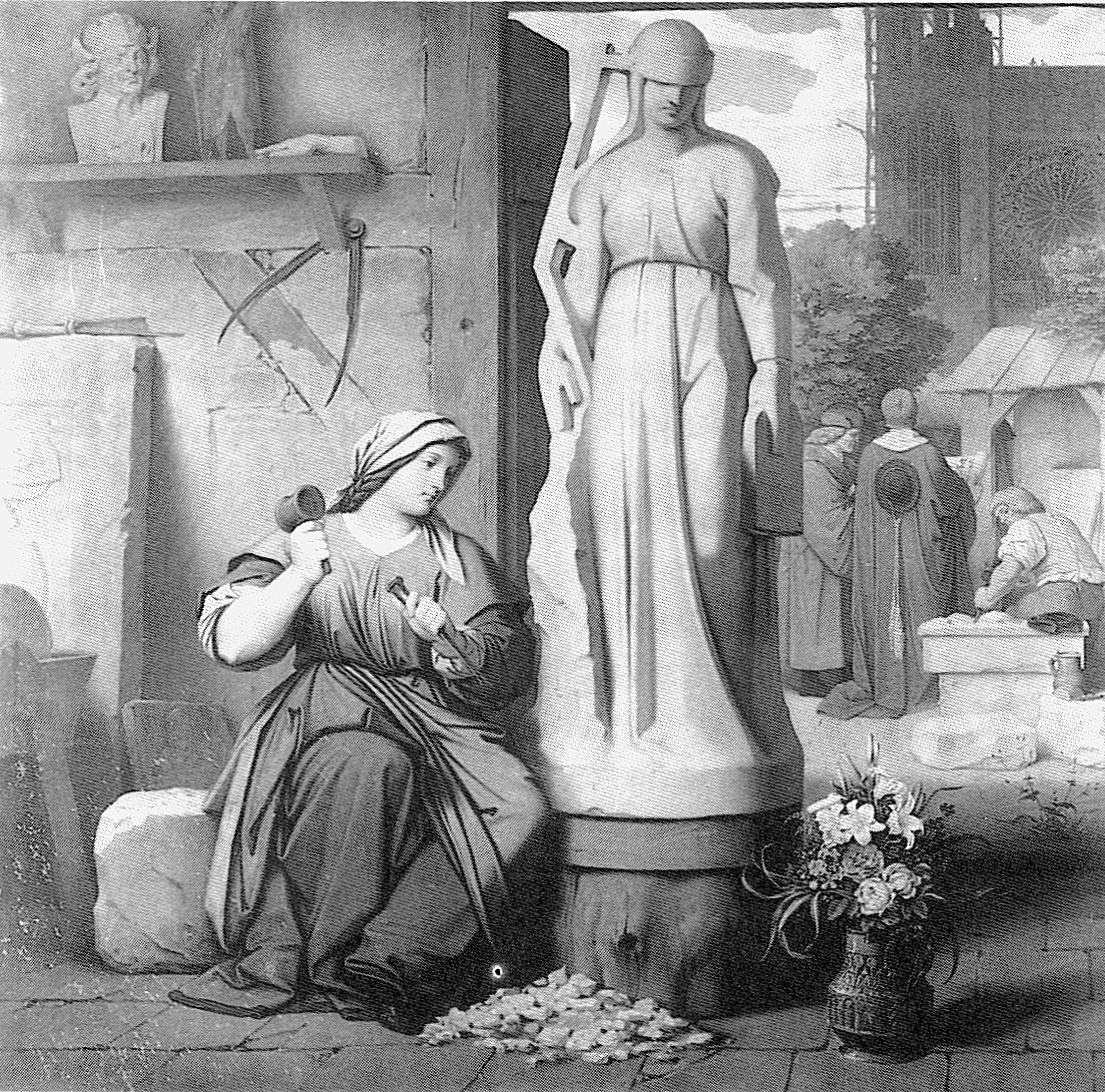
The mythical Sabina von Steinbach

Women in Medieval and Renaissance Europe were legally assumed to be subject to their fathers, then to their husbands after marriage. The status of women within Medieval trades was largely dependent on the local interpretation of femme sole, the legal term for a single woman. This was usually the widow of a tradesman, who was permitted to continue her husband's business after his death, and often established in the rights and privileges of his trade guild or company. More rarely, single women would achieve success in their father's trade. Exceptions occurred mainly in trades linked to traditional women's occupations, such as haberdashery and needlecraft.

In Norwich, a woman called Gunnilda is listed as a mason in the Calendar for Close Rolls for 1256. It is reputed that Sabina von Steinbach, the daughter of the architect, worked on Strasbourg Cathedral in the early part of the 14th century, although the first reference to her work comes 300 years later. In England, hints of female participation appear in the Regius Manuscript (c. 1390–1425), and in the Guild records at York Minster in 1408. Women were employed in administrative roles in the London Mason's Company, and as such received the benefits of membership. Also, the charge in York Manuscript No 4, dated 1693 and used as a warrant by the later Grand Lodge of All England at York, contains the phrase "hee or shee that is to be made mason". While a number of masonic historians have categorised this as a "misprint", Adolphus Frederick Alexander Woodford, who studied and catalogued these documents, considered it genuine.

In the sixteenth and seventeenth centuries, the status of women amongst masons in Britain is likely to be similar to that codified in the minutes of the lodge at St. Mary's Chapel in Edinburgh. A burgess could pay for the Freedom to employ and instruct masons. The widow of a master mason could accept commissions from his old clients, provided that she employed a journeyman of the lodge to supervise the work.

== Lodges of Adoption ==
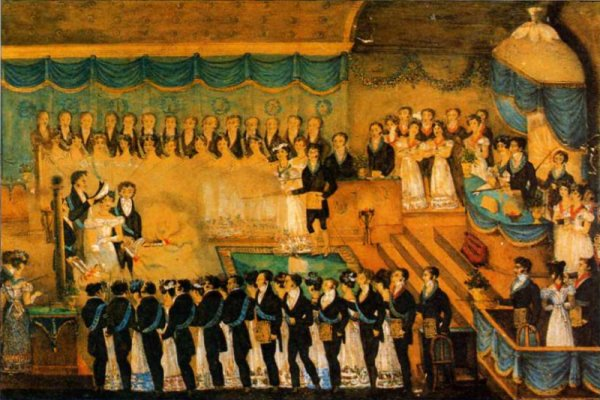
Admission of a young lady into a Lodge of Adoption

As the Freemasonry of the Premier Grand Lodge of England spread in France, the French fraternity stayed within the letter of Anderson's proscription of women, but saw no reason to ban them from their banquets or their religious services. During the 1740s, lodges of adoption began to appear. Attached to a regular (men only) lodge, wives and female relatives of the masons would be admitted to a parallel system of degrees, with a similar moral undertone to the authentic rite of the lodge. The earliest had a nautical theme.

In 1747, the Chevalier Beauchaine began the Order of Woodcutters (Ordre des Fendeurs), with rites supposedly based on an early version of the Carbonari. In 1774, the lodges of adoption came under the jurisdiction of the Grand Orient de France, and the published regulations show a system of four degrees:

1. Apprentice, or Female Apprentice.
2. Compagnonne, or Journeywoman.
3. Maîtresse, or Mistress.
4. Parfaite Maçonne, or Perfect Masoness.

Further degrees came and went, with a ten-degree system evolving at the end of the Eighteenth century. The idea spread widely in Europe, but never appeared in England. After a brief eclipse during the Reign of Terror at the start of the French Revolution, lodges of adoption flourished, with the Empress Josephine presiding over one in Strasbourg in 1805.

In 1808, the Grand Orient decided that these lodges were unconstitutional, and they became marginalised until re-activated by the same Grand Orient in 1901. In their new incarnation, the chair was taken by a woman, where previously only a man could occupy the "Chair of King Solomon". Final separation occurred in 1935, and in 1959 they adopted the Ancient and Accepted Scottish Rite, embracing regular masonry as Grande Loge féminine de France. Only one lodge, Cosmos, holds to the adoptive rite.

=== Sweden ===
Women Freemasons seem to have been introduced early in Sweden, though the information in scarce: according to documents of the Swedish Freemasons, Hedvig Charlotta Nordenflycht was in 1747 the Grand Mistress of in a certain "Ordre de la resemblance", which can thus be interpreted as a Women's Lodge of Adoption. However, a confirmed Women's Lodge does not appear until the 1770s.

On 2 May 1776, the Grand Master of the Swedish Freemasonic Order, Duke Charles, had his spouse, Hedvig Elisabeth Charlotte of Holstein-Gottorp, inaugurated as the Grand Mistress of a female lodge of adoption to his own lodge at the Royal Palace, Stockholm, named "Le véritable et constante amitié". This new woman's lodge of adoption was confirmed by seal from Grand Master of the French Freemasonic Order, Louis Philippe II, Duke of Orléans, and the Grand Mistress of the French Woman's Lodge of Adoption, Bathilde d'Orléans, on 8 May 1776. The Women's Lodge of Adoption was organized by rules set by Duchess Charlotte in three grades with a ritual in five grades after a French model, and met in the same rooms in the apartments of Duke Charles in the Royal Palace where the male lodge met. In addition to Duchess Charlotte herself, Sophie von Fersen and Hedvig Eleonora von Fersen, both introduced in 1776, are confirmed as members of the Lodge of Adoption, and Charlotte Stierneld is likely to have been member of the same lodge, as she was named as "already a Freemason" when she was introduced in the Yellow Rose Lodge.

It is unknown how long the Lodge of Adoption was active, but it is likely that it functioned at least until 1789, when Duchess Charlotte mentioned that Duke Charles allowed her to participate in "secret gatherings" to explore the occult, and perhaps until the foundation of the short lived Co-Masonic Lodge Yellow Rose Lodge in 1802, but was surely abolished in 1803, when all secret societies at court were banned.

== Other concordant bodies admitting women ==
Concordant rites exist with the blessing and often the active support of regular masonic lodges. There are several concordant bodies in the United States which admit the wives and female relatives of Freemasons. The Dutch Order of Weavers admits only women, while in the American orders the men and women share in the ritual. Like the lodges of adoption, they have their own ceremonies, which means that some grand lodges view them as irregular.

- Order of the Eastern Star In 1850, Rob Morris created the Order of the Eastern Star for Freemasons and their female relatives. Often classed as an adoptive rite, its ritual is based on the Bible. It continues to flourish in the United States of America, and maintains a presence in Scotland.
- Prince Hall Order of Eastern Star Prince Hall Order of the Eastern Star is an auxiliary order to Prince Hall Freemasonry founded in 1874.
- Order of the Amaranth The ritual of the Order of the Amaranth was conceived in 1860 to be loosely based on a society with a similar name instituted over two centuries earlier by Queen Christina of Sweden. Open to master masons and their female relatives, members were once compelled to join the Order of the Eastern Star first, but the two organisations became separate in 1921.
- Ladies' Oriental Shrine of North America Founded in 1903 in Wheeling, West Virginia, the order has over 16,000 members in 76 Courts across North America. A woman must be related to a member of the Ancient Arabic Order of the Nobles of the Mystic Shrine or a Master Mason by birth, marriage or adoption. She must be at least 18 years of age and a resident for at least six months in the area of the Court in which membership is desired.
- The Order of the White Shrine of Jerusalem Like the members of the Masonic Lodge and other appendant bodies, members of the White Shrine must profess a belief in a Supreme Being. However, the White Shrine goes one step further, requiring members to profess a belief in Jesus Christ as the Savior and Redeemer of the World. Membership is open to female relatives of Master Masons or members either active for three years or majority of the International Order of the Rainbow for Girls or Job's Daughters International who have attained of eighteen (18) years of age.
- Heroines of Jericho, Offshoots of Prince Hall Freemasonry, the Heroines of Jericho are open to Royal Arch masons together with their female relatives.
- Order of Cyrenes Offshoots of Prince Hall Freemasonry, the Order of Cyrenes is open to Templar masons together with their female relatives.
- Order of Weavers Formed on 17 July 1947, the Orde van Weefsters Vita Feminea Textura, or the Order of Weavers was the creation of the wives of Dutch Freemasons. They constructed a ritual system using the tools of weaving in their symbology, which they judged to be more appropriate for women than stonemasons tools. Membership is open to any woman, who is at least 18 years of age. There are now 17 lodges spread through the Netherlands and one in Paris, France.

== Quasi-Masonic rites ==
Many rites accepting women have ritual of a Masonic style, are founded by Masons, but at best have an ambivalent reception amongst Grand Lodge masons. Nonetheless, they actively recruit new members from within regular masonry.

- The Order of the Pug: The Order of the Pug, or Mops-Orden, is believed to have been founded in Bavaria in about 1740, to circumvent the Papal ban on Catholics becoming Freemasons. Admitting both men and women, the order had a single rite, based on the faithfulness of the pug dog.
- Cagliostro's Egyptian Rite: In 1784, in Bordeaux, the man calling himself Count Alessandro di Cagliostro opened the first lodge of his Egyptian Rite masonry. This had the three degrees of normal French masonry (Apprentice, Companion and Master), but with a greatly different, more mystical ritual. Cagliostro claimed that he was re-introducing true Freemasonry, and he attempted to attract candidates wherever he went. Male candidates were already Freemasons, but women were also admitted. The ceremony for the two sexes differed only in minor points – males were admitted by Cagliostro (the Grand Copht) and females by his wife (the Queen of Sheba). On admission, the women were told that they were now Freemasons.
- Rite of Memphis-Misraïm: Proceeding from Cagliostro's rite, the Rite of Misraïm (from Arabic مصر Miṣr = Egypt) continued as a form of mixed, esoteric masonry. Banned in 1817, it was reformulated as the Rite of Memphis in 1838, and in spite of fluctuating fortunes in its French home, began to spread internationally during the second half of the nineteenth century. During the 1880s the two rites were fused by Giuseppe Garibaldi into the Rite of Memphis-Misraïm. The modern order now boasts up to 99 degrees, not all of which actually worked.
- The Hermetic Order of the Golden Dawn: The membership and ritual of the Hermetic Order of the Golden Dawn were strongly linked to Freemasonry, but membership was open to non-masons and to women. The grades formed a teaching system for the Kabbalah, and initiates had to pass an exam before being allowed to advance to the next degree.

== Female Masons in "masculine only" Masonic bodies ==
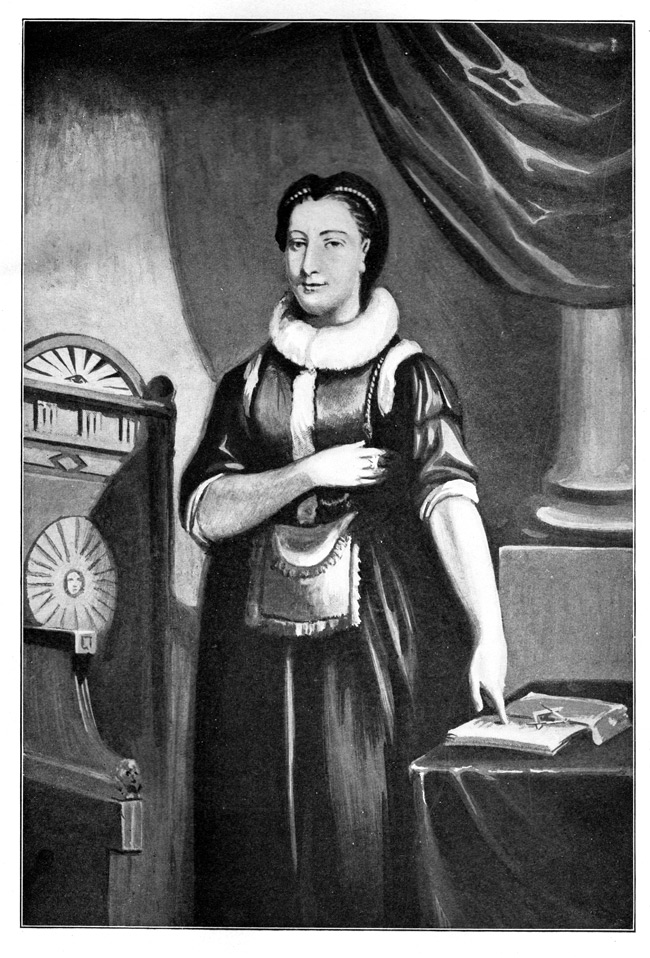
Elizabeth Aldworth in Masonic regalia, from a mezzotint of 1811

There have been a few reported cases of a woman joining a "masculine only" masonic lodge. These cases are exceptions and are debated by masonic historians.

=== Elizabeth Aldworth ===
One account of a woman being admitted to Freemasonry in the 18th century is the case of Elizabeth Aldworth (born St Leger), who is reported to have surreptitiously viewed the proceedings of a Lodge meeting held at Doneraile House, the private house of her father, first Viscount Doneraile, a resident of Doneraile, County Cork, Ireland. Upon discovering the breach of their secrecy, the Lodge resolved to admit and obligate her, and thereafter she proudly appeared in public in Masonic clothing. Speculative attempts to link the lodge of her initiation with a documented lodge of the Grand Lodge of Ireland have proved futile, but there is no reason that her father should not have instituted a lodge in his home, and the authenticity of her initiation is generally accepted.

=== 18th century Hungary ===
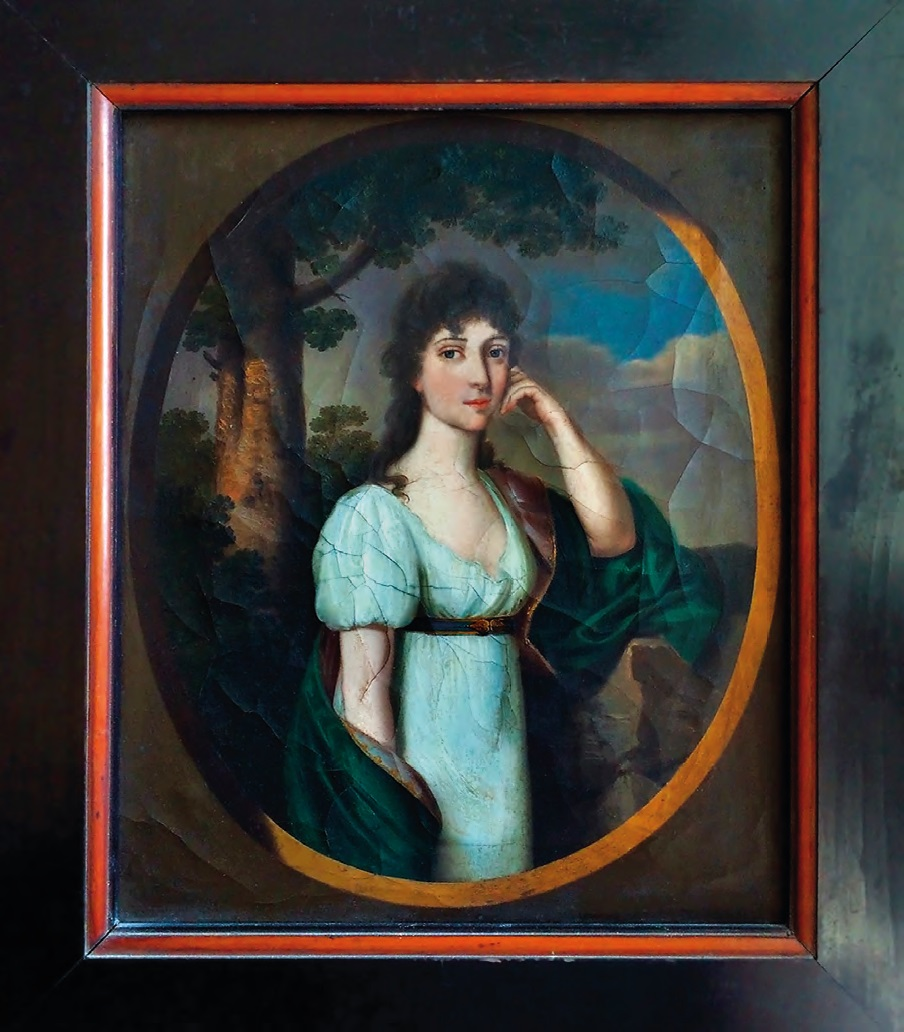
Ms Imréné Pottornyay, Anna Apollónia Máriássy

Lajos Abafi (Ludwig Aigner), the historian of Hungarian (and Austrian) Freemasonry in the 18th century, reports that in 1778 Márton Heinzeli, the head of the Eperjes (today Prešov in Slovakia) lodge named "Zurn tugendhaften Reisenden (Virtuous Traveler)", initiated three women as Freemasons. They wanted to admit more women and set up a separate women's lodge, but this was forbidden by Heinzeli's Viennese superiors.

According to Abafi, the case took place as follows:

In 1779, it finally reached a point where neither lodge work nor Rosicrucian conventions could be held and chemical laboratories could not be subordinated. The main obstacle was the reluctance of the wifes, especially of the brethren: Emerich Pottornyay, Berzeviczy, Kapy and Krasznecz, against all kinds of practical experiments. To make the ladies more conciliatory and more inclined to the Order, Heinzeli initiated three of them into the 1st degree of Fremasonry in 1778. These, however, stormed him with the award of further degrees, because they wanted to gradually found their own Women's Lodge, on condition that this would at least indirectly benefit the Rosicrucian Order, "because more ... and we could more easily hide among them", – Heinzeli promised to do his best in this regard. For the time being, he translated the 3 lowest degrees from French into German and sent the translation to the Rosicrucians in Vienna for examination. 1) The Generalate of the Order, however, prohibited – with full appreciation of the good intention – under threat of suspension or exclusion, the frequency of the women's lodge, 2) and thus this electrification plan had also become into water. The Women's Lodge could not be built, and the ladies, whose expectations had been exchanged, became even more bitter against to brothers.

In any case, it is clear from the hereinabove text that the initiation of the ladies as Freemasons was incidental, in order to revive the Order of the Rosicrucians. The recorders of the event have been so unaware of the significance of this – it was the first time in Hungary that women were initiated as Freemasons – that neither the names of the ladies have been recorded, nor which of the four of them was initiated by Heinzeli. Three of the four were inaugurated, but it is not known who they were, so only at the 75% level that they were Freemasons.

=== Madame de Xaintrailles ===
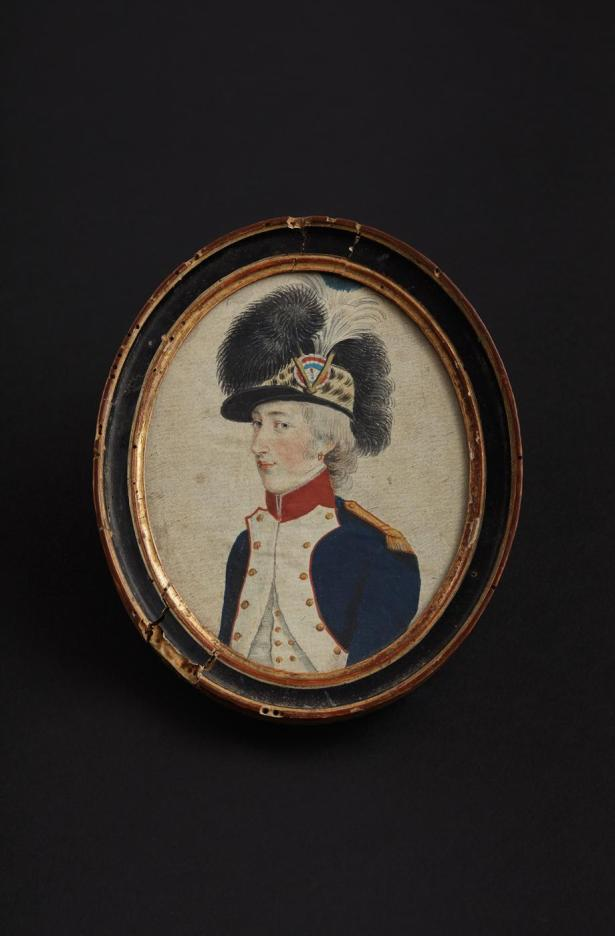
Marie-Henriette Heiniken, better known as "Madame de Xaintrailles"

German-born Marie-Henriette Heiniken was an adventurous woman, better known as "Madame de Xaintrailles," who disguised herself as a man in order to serve in the military during the Napoleonic Wars, earning her rank "at the point of the sword." In the attached portrait, she is shown wearing the military uniform of a French cavalry major. Heiniken purportedly acted as aide-de-camp to General Charles Antoine Xaintrailles, who is cited in most sources as her husband, and in others as her lover.

Heiniken was one of only a few women to become a Freemason during the eighteenth and nineteenth centuries. According to one account, she went to the Masonic Loge des Frères Artistes in Paris in hopes of joining the French Adoption Rite, a lodge specifically for women. Instead, when the brothers learned her identity, they decided to initiate her into the First, or Entered Apprentice, Degree in the male lodge because of her brave service. Period sources have yet to be uncovered to verify the details, but the story has been published repeatedly in Masonic histories.

=== Countess Helene/Ilona Hadik-Barkóczy de Szala ===
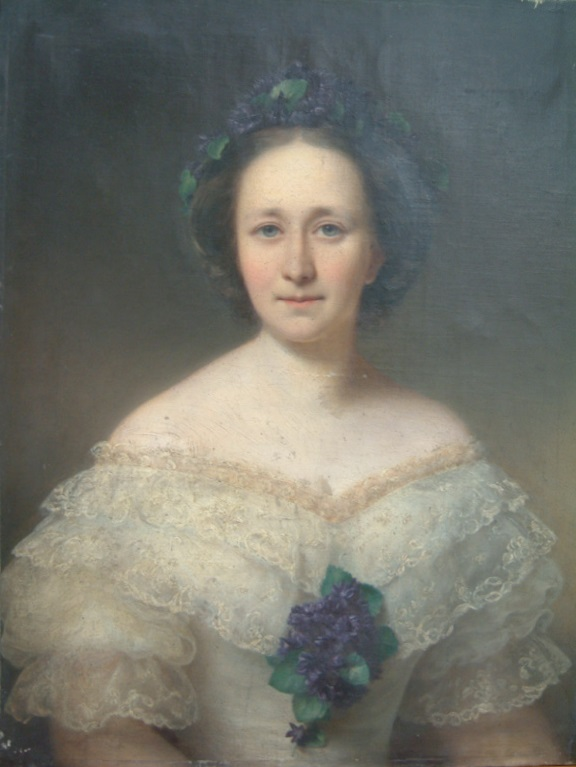
Helene/Ilona Hadik-Barkóczy

Countess Barkóczy (1833–1887) became fascinated by her grand-uncle's books on Freemasonry, browsing through his library after his death. By this time, she was married to Count Bela Hadik, Emperor Maximilian's aide-de-camp. The Countess' request for initiation into a Masonic lodge was supported by the Johannite Grand Master Ferenc Pulszky, and she was duly initiated in 1875 by a provincial lodge of Grand Orient, Lodge Egyenlőség (Equality) in Unghvár. (In Hungary in that time there were two masonic Grand Lodges, the Grand Lodge of St. John and the Grand Orient worked independently from each other.) Her initiation was then declared void by decision of Grand Orient and the perpetrators were punished, but the lodge wasn't erased, and only one officer was excluded. The countess defended her request and argued its validity in common law. In her reasoning she brought up her knowledge of freemasonry, her legal status as a son (praefectio) and the absence of any mention of candidates' gender in the constitution of the Grand Orient. The Orient, holding to Prussian law, considered the initiation null and void because the usual bureaucratic formalities were not adhered to. The next year, after debating her status, the Grand Orient demanded the return of her certificate, but she never complied. Masonic sources repeat Denslow and Truman (10,000 masons) giving her name as Countess Helene Hadik Barkóczy, while biographical and family sources use the Hungarian name Ilona.

=== Countess Júlia Apraxin ===
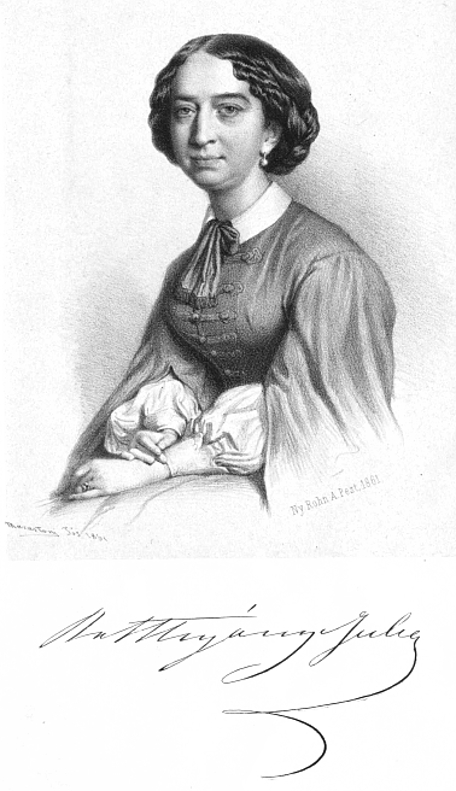
Júlia Apraxin/Batthyány Júlia

Júlia (Julia) Apraxin (1830–1913) was initiated in Madrid in 1880 to a Masonic lodge named "Fraternidad Iberica" (Brotherhood of Iberia), however in addition to her Russian ethnicity she identified herself as Hungarian, since she had been brought up in Hungary, and her Hungarian foster father could probably be her real father.

Born on 16 October 1830 in Vienna, Julia Apraxin was registered as the daughter of the Russian aristocrat and diplomat Count Alexandre Petrovich Apraxin and Countess Hélène (Ielena) Bezobrazova, an aristocratic lady of Polish-Russian origin. In 1828 Julia's mother met Count József Esterházy and the couple married later in 1841, following the divorce from her first husband. Count Esterházy—as we know from his diary—treated Julia as his own daughter. In her childhood and youth, Julia lived with her parents and brother Demeter in Vienna and in the Esterhazy Castle in Cseklész, near Pozsony (today Pressburg, Bratislava).

On 15 October 1849 she married Count Arthur (Artúr) Batthyány. Settling down in Vienna for about ten years with their five children, the couple lived the worriless life of the high society with balls, dances, masquerades and carriage ridings filling their days. In 1853 Johann Strauss II dedicated one of his polkas, the Tanzi Bäri (Dancing Bear) to her, insinuating that the Countess acted as a bear-leader making men dance like bears.

She wrote novels, short stories and plays, which were staged. In one of her pieces, she depicted the supremacy of the spiritual aristocracy over the aristocracy of birth—and this may have been one of the reasons the aristocracy cast her out. The other reason was her divorce from her husband, the third and the most amazing thing was that despite her aristocratic roots, she became an actress.

Julia Apraxin travelled to Paris on 1 May 1863. In addition to the French press, Hungarian and Austrian newspapers also reported on their performances; while the Hungarians praised the Austrians gloated over the less successful ones. Julia Apraxin concluded a Russian orthodox marriage with Lorenzo Rubio Guillén y Montero de Espinosa (1835–1895), a Spanish cavalry captain in 1867. Still living in Paris, on 28 March 1879, the couple gave a party in a stylish hotel in Madrid for the elite of the Spanish capital including the representatives of the worlds of politics, science, the police and literature. Presumably, Julia met with the representatives of the "Fraternidad Iberica" Masonic lodge, allowing members of the Investigative Committee to prepare a recommendation of the countess.

In any case, on 14 June 1880, the first woman in Spain was initiated in a masculine lodge with great interest, about which the French Masonic newspaper Chaîne d’Union reported in detail. Since some of the readers of Chaîne d’Union had argued about the correctness of the report and the regularity of the initiation, assuming that the Countess was admitted into a female, adoption lodge, in new articles, they clarified that Julia Apraxin had been admitted into a masculine lodge. Apart from her initiation, we have no knowledge of the countess ever visiting the works of the lodge. She probably moved to Madrid at the time; however, the Parisian newspapers did not mention her anymore and neither did the Spanish press. Her death was reported by the weekly Catholic La Lectura Dominical in the 24 May 1913 issue.

=== Salome Anderson ===
In 1892, American newspapers hailed Salome Anderson, of Oakland, California, as "the only female Freemason in the world". She had, according to some, learned the secrets of masonry by hiding in the lodge room in her uncle's house, and was made a mason in order to pledge her to secrecy. She served on the board of trustees of her temple, and took higher degrees, as well as joining the Order of the Eastern Star.

The theme of a young woman hiding in a lodge room had become a standard formula for this type of report, which was uncritically echoed and embellished as it spread from newspaper to newspaper. Anderson herself denied that it was possible for a woman to be made a mason, but remained non-committal or downright enigmatic when questioned as to the origin of her extensive knowledge of Freemasonry. Born in Alsace in 1818, she moved to Paris after her parents died and lived with her uncle, a “prominent mason”. She met and married Captain Andrew Anderson in the 1840s, and settled in New Orleans, accompanying her husband on his coastal voyages in their own vessel, and managing their finances. They moved to Oakland, California, in 1854, where Andrew became a respected businessman and an active mason. He died in 1867, leaving Salome a wealthy widow, who turned her fortune to helping masonic charities. She became the founding treasurer of Oak Leaf Chapter No 8 of the Order of the Eastern Star, and when a Masonic Temple was built, she became the largest stock-holder. In spite of opposition, she was elected to the board of trustees. In 1892, the Trestle Board published a biography of her as a prominent citizen and implied that she had acquired some degree of masonic knowledge from the masons meeting at the house of her uncle. The San Francisco News-Letter and Advertiser then embellished the story by saying that she "claimed to be a mason", having cajoled the younger members of her uncle's lodge into clandestinely conferring the three Blue Lodge degrees on her. This story was rapidly picked up by the West Coast press, and various versions of the story were passed around. While she strenuously denied that she had come by her knowledge in an improper way, in subsequent interviews she refused to be drawn on the source of her masonic knowledge. It is not known if she was ever initiated.

=== Catherine Babington ===
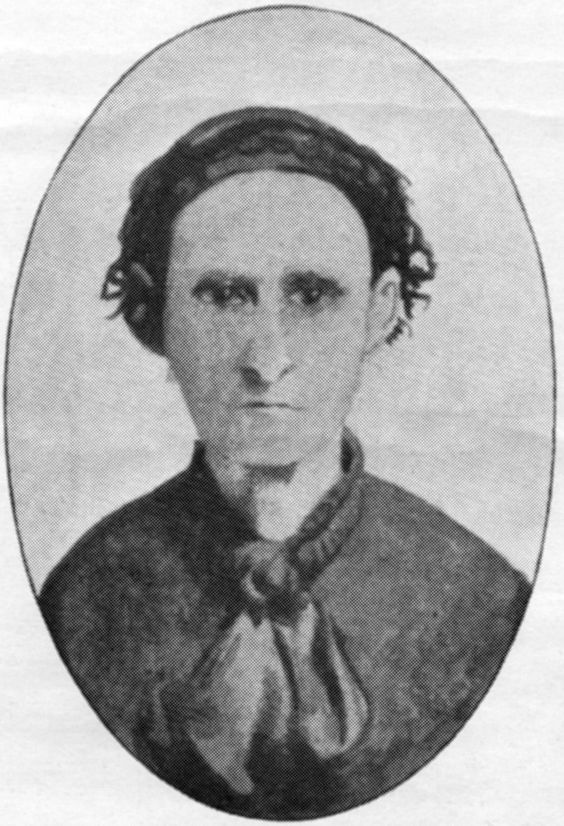
Catherine Sweet Babington

A similar story was published about Catherine Babington, first in her obituary, in Shelby, North Carolina, in 1886, then in a short book by her son outlining her masonic career. Hailed as the only female mason in the United States, she is said to have obtained the secrets at the age of 16 by hiding in her uncles' lodge room in Princess, Kentucky. Having lost her father at an early age, she spent much of her childhood at her grandfather's house, where she became a favourite of her uncles. They attended a lodge in an unused chapel above Catherine's school-room, which she often helped them clean. As a teenager, Catherine Sweet (Babington being her married name) attended lodge meetings for a year, hiding in the old pulpit, finally being discovered when one of her uncles returned unexpectedly for a rifle he had left in the ante-room. Being questioned by the lodge, it was discovered that she had committed much of the ritual to memory, and was, like Anderson, made a mason to swear her to secrecy, but in this instance not admitted to membership of the lodge. The sole source of the story is her son, and much of the detail remains unconfirmed. There is no account or recollection of such a lodge room in or around Princess.

== Co-Freemasonry: Freemasonry for men and women ==
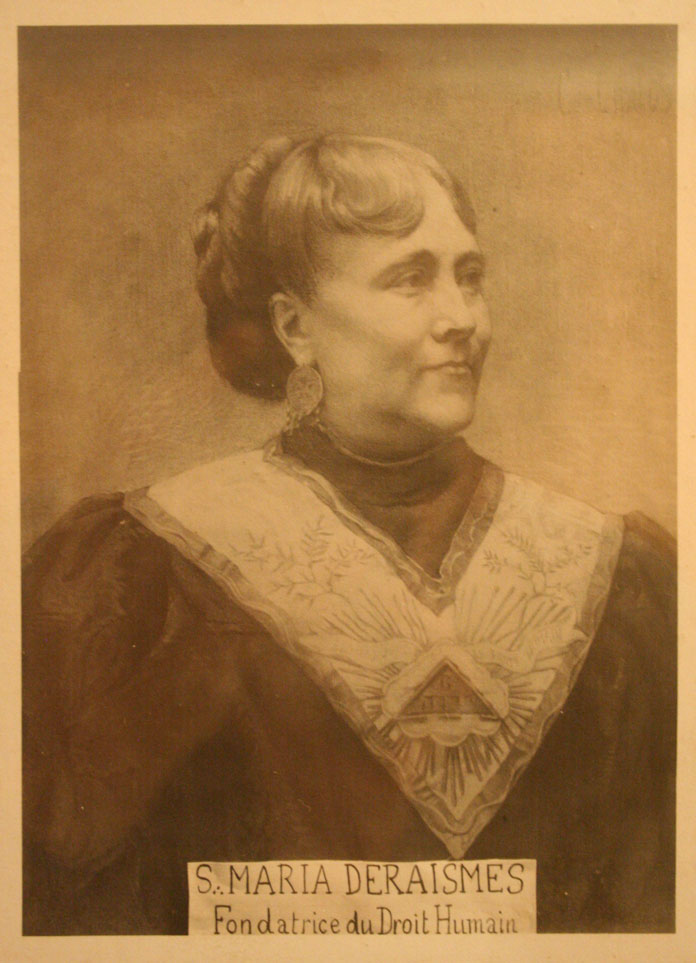
Maria Deraismes

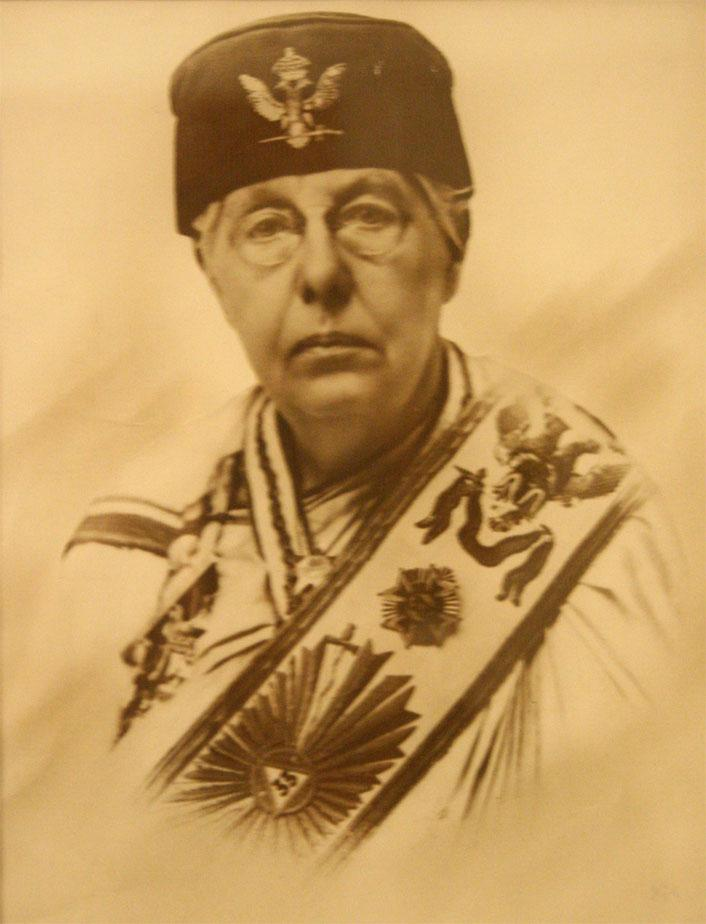
Annie Besant in Masonic regalia

On 14 January 1882, Maria Deraismes was initiated into Freemasonry in Loge Libre Penseurs (Freethinkers Lodge), in Le Pecq, just outside Paris. Deraismes was a well known writer and campaigner for democracy, women's rights, and the separation of church and state. Her lodge, on 9 January, had seceded from la Grande Loge Symbolique Ecossaise in order to initiate her. She then resigned, to enable her lodge to rejoin their previous jurisdiction. She did, however, persist in her efforts to legitimately become a mason, with the assistance of Doctor Georges Martin, a fellow campaigner for women's rights, and a Freemason. After a decade of trying they started to form their own lodge, and between 1 June 1892 and 4 March 1893, assembled 16 women who wished to become masons. They were initiated as Apprentices on 14 March 1893, Companions on 24 March, and Master Masons on 1 April. This done, on 4 April the now mixed lodge of male and female masons proceeded to elect its officers and constitute itself as La Grande Loge Symbolique Ecossaise de France, Le Droit Humain, soon to become l’Ordre Maçonnique Mixte International Le Droit Humain. This would flourish as international co-masonry, which Deraismes never lived to see. She died the following February.

Having resolved at the outset to adopt the Ancient and Accepted Scottish Rite as their ritual, the new Grand Lodge found itself with only the three craft degrees, and aspiring to a 33-degree system. Male masons were sent into other jurisdictions to acquire the necessary ritual. In 1899, ten masons in the Droit Humain received the 33rd degree, allowing them to form a Supreme Council. Lodges had opened in Paris, Blois, Lyon, Rouen, and Zürich. By 1914, the movement had spread to Britain, the Far East, the United States, Belgium, and the Netherlands.

Co-Freemasonry was brought to the English-speaking world by the socialist and theosophist Annie Besant. Passing through the usual three degrees of craft masonry in 1902, she founded the Lodge of Human Duty No. 6 in London that same year. French-speaking lodges started to appear in the United States in 1903, but it was again Besant who opened the first English speaking lodge, in 1908. The French lodges took their lead from the Grand Orient de France in not requiring any religious belief in their members. Besant, with the blessing of Paris, followed the lead of the United Grand Lodge of England in requiring initiates to believe in a supreme being. Craft degrees in English speaking lodges took on a less continental, and more mystical flavour, with Besant importing the Dharma, or Besant Leadbeater ritual to both Britain and the United States.

Modern Co-Freemasonry is divided into self-governing Federations, Jurisdictions, and pioneer lodges, bound to an International Constitution and a Supreme Council, which delegates elect at an international convention every five years. In common with any other Masonic jurisdiction, the president of the Supreme Council is referred to as the Grand Master. It currently has 28,000 members spread through 60 countries and five continents.

== Exclusive women's lodges ==
A women's lodge existed in Boston during the last quarter of the eighteenth century. Hannah Mather Crocker, in an apology for Freemasonry written in 1815, claims to have presided over such a lodge, yet her description, "founded on the original principles of true ancient masonry, as far as was consistent with the female character" leaves the actual constitution open to question. It is also clear that St. Anne's lodge was extinct at the time of her writing about it. Crocker's leadership of this exclusively female Masonic lodge stands as an alternative to historical frameworks that emphasize the formal political exclusion and public silencing of women in the development of republican, liberal political practice in the West.

As Co-Freemasonry spread in England from 1902, some members became alarmed by decisions taken by the governing body in Paris. There was a perceived threat to the ancient form of masonic ritual. Resignations resulted, in 1908, in the formation of a new Grand Lodge, which became the Honourable Fraternity of Antient Masonry, under a clergyman, the Rev. Dr. William Frederick Cobb, as Grand Master. His retirement after four years led to the election of a female Grand Master. Reverting to the original legal meaning of Brotherhood, the members have addressed each other as Brother since 1908. A further split occurred in 1913, when those wishing to include higher degrees, specifically the Royal Arch, left to form the Honourable Fraternity of Ancient Freemasons. Both societies are now exclusively female. The Honourable Fraternity of Antient Masonry restricted initiation to women and stopped admitting male visitors. The last male member left in 1935. The older society, having started working higher degrees, changed its name in 1958, appending the Order of Women Freemasons, as they are known today. Both bodies have lodges throughout the United Kingdom, and the Order of Women Freemasons also has lodges in Australasia, Zimbabwe, and Spain.

La Grande Loge féminine de France, which emerged from adoptive masonry in 1959, spread to Belgium in 1974, and la Grande Loge féminine de Belgique was formed in 1981. By 2001, they had 35 lodges, three of which were in the United States. These arose due to La Croisee des Chemins (Crossroads), a lodge under la Grande Loge féminine de Belgique formed to spread Freemasonry amongst the women of other countries.

== Recognition of women as Freemasons ==
Continental Freemasonry has strong relations with female Masonic lodges. Le Droit Humain enjoys fraternal relations with the Grand Orient de France, the Grande Loge féminine de France, and the Grande Loge de France. The Grand Orient de France, in addition to recognising women's masonry, decided in 2010 that there was no reason that its lodges should not be able to initiate women, thus adding another strand to international co-masonry.

The Anglo-American jurisdictions of Freemasonry follow a set of traditions referred to in ritual as the Ancient Landmarks. These comprise the practices and precepts perceived as "ancient" at the beginning of the 18th century, and frozen in time by Anderson's Constitutions and similar works which followed and copied it. Among Anderson's Ancient Charges, still enshrined in the constitutions of the United Grand Lodge of England (UGLE) and many other Grand Lodges, is a description of the person who may be admitted to Freemasonry, "good and true men, free-born, and of mature and discreet age and sound judgement, no bondmen, no women, no immoral or scandalous men, but of good report". For this reason, any lodge admitting women is considered irregular by many lodges and Grand Lodges. Masons attending irregular lodges or subscribing to irregular jurisdictions, are subject to immediate exclusion or suspension from the craft. However, the UGLE has stated since 1999 that two English women's jurisdictions, The Order of Women Freemasons and The Honourable Fraternity of Ancient Freemasons, are regular in practice except for their inclusion of women, and has indicated that, while not formally recognized, these bodies may be regarded as part of Freemasonry when describing Freemasonry in general.

In North America, neither 'mainstream' Freemasonry nor Prince Hall Freemasonry accept women, but rather have associated separate bodies, some of which are mentioned above, which are "Masonic" in character, but not Masonic in their content. These bodies, together with the co-freemasonry practiced in continental Europe, are not currently supported by the UGLE.

== Transgender people and Freemasonry ==
In 2018, guidance was released by the United Grand Lodge of England stating that, in regard to transgender women, "A Freemason who after initiation ceases to be a man does not cease to be a Freemason." The guidance also states that transgender men are allowed to become Freemasons.

Other Masonic jurisdictions may have different guidance on the issue.

== See also ==
- Le Droit Humain
- List of Masonic Grand Lodges
