= Le Droit Humain =

Global Masonic organisation

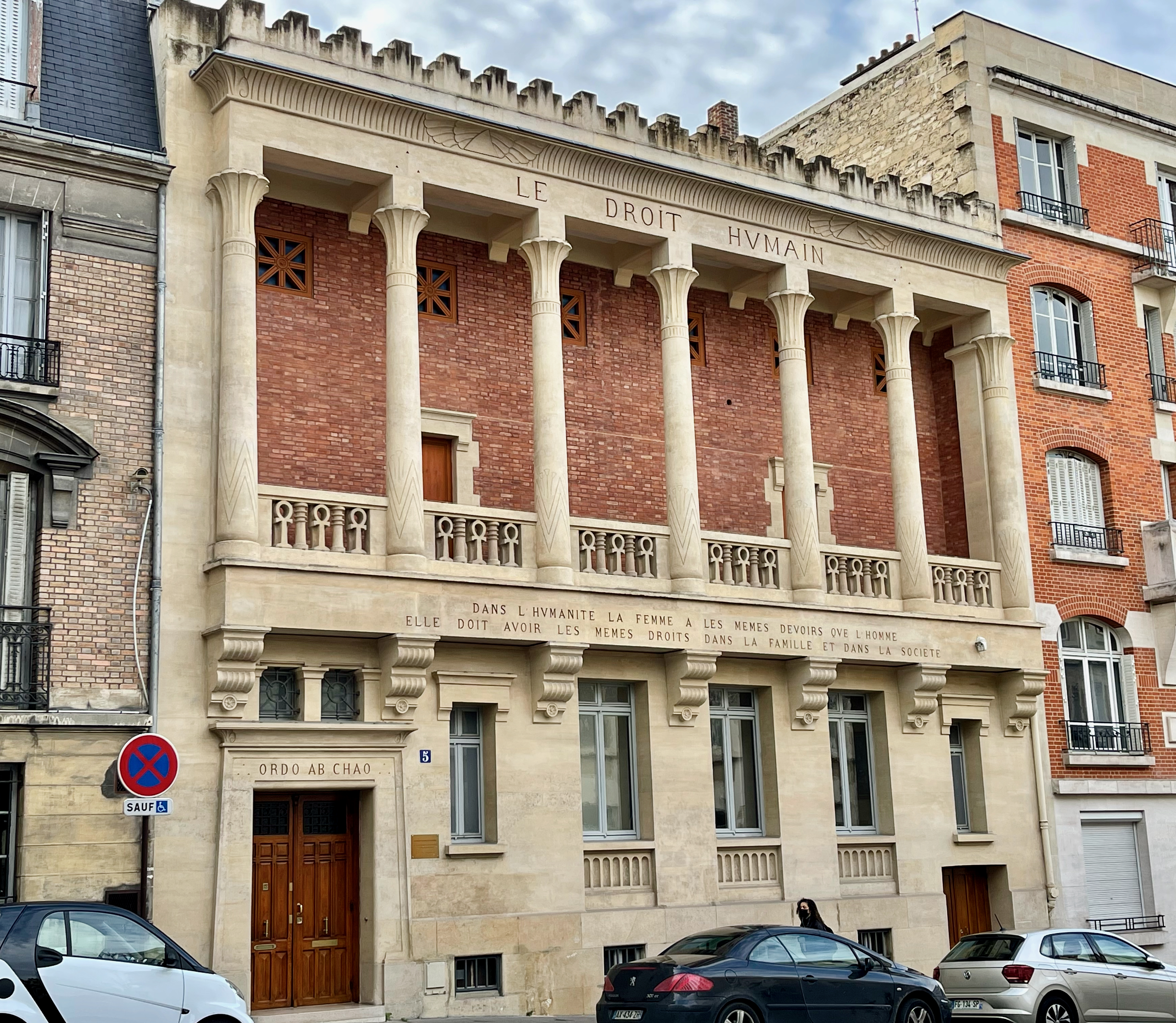
Headquarters of Le Droit Humain, the International Order of Freemasonry for Men and Women

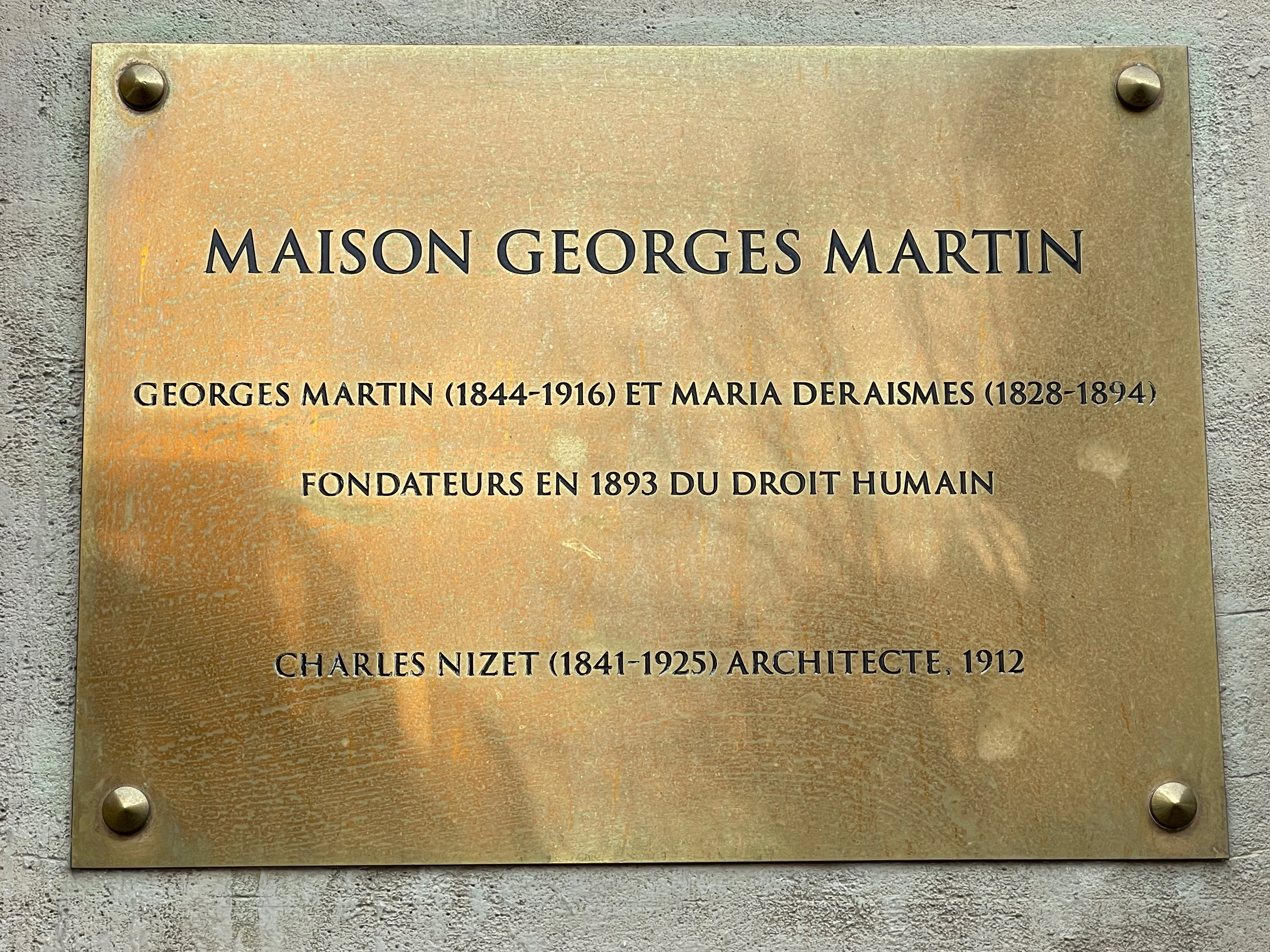

The International Order of Freemasonry for Men and Women, LE DROIT HUMAIN is a global Masonic order, membership of which is available to men and women on equal terms, regardless of nationality, religion or ethnicity. This practice is known as Co-Freemasonry.

== History ==
Its headquarters is in Paris, France, where it was founded in 1893 by Georges Martin and Maria Deraismes.

The Order is founded on the ancient teachings and traditions of Freemasonry, using Masonic ritual and symbolism as its tools in the search for truth. On the individual level, the Order aims "to promote the progress of individual worth, without the imposition of dogma, or exacting the abandonment of cultural or religious ideas". On a collective level it works "to unite men and women who agree on a humanist spirituality whilst respecting individual and cultural differences".

In contrast with other Masonic organisations which operate in national or state jurisdiction only, Le Droit Humain is a global fraternity with many Federations and Jurisdictions worldwide, each of which work the Scottish Rite from the 1st to the 33rd degree. The Order is administered by the Supreme Council, which has its headquarters in Paris. Within the International Constitution, however, member Federations have the freedom of self-governance.

Le Droit Humain has about 34,000 members in more than 70 countries around the world and on all inhabited continents.

== Belgium ==
The Belgian Federation of Le Droit Humain (French: la Fédération Belge du Droit Humain; Dutch: Belgische Federatie van Le Droit Humain) is a Belgian cupola of masonic lodges which is accessible for men and women, and works in the 33 symbolic degrees of freemasonry. The first Belgian Lodge of Le Droit Humain was founded in 1912.

== Great Britain ==
What became the British Federation began on 26 September 1902 with the consecration of Lodge Human Duty No. 6 in London. The establishment of this lodge was what formalised the Order as international and the Federation was formally founded on the 14 March 1906.

=== History ===
==== Founding ====
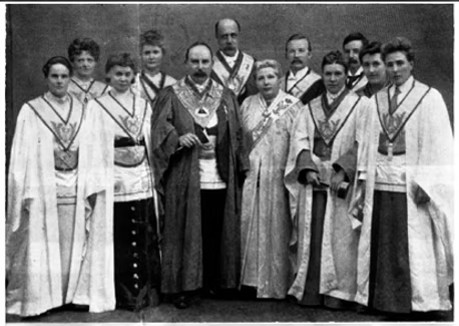
The founders of Lodge Human Duty no. 6. Annie Besant is fourth from left on the front row

The three most commonly referenced figures in the history of the British Federation are Annie Besant, Maria Deraismes and Georges Martin. Deraismes and Martin co-founded what would become Le Droit Humain on 4 April 1893. In 1902, Besant was initiated in Paris and, along with others, found Lodge Human Duty No. 6. At this time the British Federation was known as The Order of Universal Co-Freemasonry in Great Britain and the British Dependencies. Today this lodge does not meet regularly, and is instead used as the recorded lodge for members no longer able to attend their own, due age, illness or similar, but still wish to be members.

Besant was installed as the first Right Worshipful Master of the lodge and in her address stated "If it is true to say that it was the English who brought Freemasonry to France, then it is the French who, today, bring it back regenerated to England, completed and strengthened by the admission of women into the Lodge at the side of men. I salute this beautiful day which affirms after almost two centuries, and even more strongly, the pressing need for human fraternity."

==== Early years ====
Development of the Federation was slow, as the founders were very new to Freemasonry. According to Scottish tradition, often used by the Federation such as in their use of 'Right Worshipful Master' rather than the English 'Worshipful Master', the original regalia was green and can be found displayed at the current headquarters of the federation. However, this was altered to be in line with the Order's official colours of ruby and sapphire in 1912.

The initial ritual used was a translation of the French one that initiated the founders. Soon though, copies of the standard ritual used in Scotland were being used, and heavily edited by hand as an original ritual began to take shape. The first iteration of this ritual would be the Dharma Ritual around 1904, combining French and Scottish traditions with Besant's spiritual and Theosophical influences, including her specially written Mystic Charges. This ritual finally evolved into the Lauderdale Ritual as used in the majority of the Federation's craft lodges today, alongside several others.

==== Location ====
The first lodge, Human Duty no. 6, was initially held at 24 Albemarle Street, London. However, by 1936 the headquarters was transferred to 10 Ladbroke Terrace, also in London, to reflect the increasing size of the Federation and necessity of a larger space. Finally, in 1992, the Federation headquarters moved to its current address at Hexagon House, 37-39 Surbiton Hill Road, Surrey.

==== Splinter organisations ====
In its history, the British Federation has seen numerous groups split off and form their own Orders due to fundamental disagreements with the leadership of the Federation and the wider Order. The first of these was the Honorable Fraternity of Antient Masonry formed on 20 June 1908, now known as the Order of Women Freemasons. This was formed due to concerns that LE DROIT HUMAIN's Paris headquarters was exerting excessive influence and trying to make the British Federation more in line with the French Federation. Initially made up of men and women, by the 1920s only women could apply for membership.

However, this Order began to see its own disputes over use of the Royal Arch side degree, which came to a head in 1913 with the formation of The Honourable Fraternity of Ancient Freemasons. From the outset this has been a female only Order.

In 1925 Aimee Bothwell Gosse found split away from the British Federation to found the Order of Ancient Free and Accepted Masonry for Men and Women, citing excessive Theosophical influence over the Federation under Annie Besant, who by this point was President of the Theosophical Society. Bothwell Gosse had been a member of the Theosophical Society but left in 1924. There remain no traces of her Order today and no official date for its dissolution can be found.

November 1997 saw the creation of the Order of the Blazing Star, renamed The Co-Freemasonic Order of the Blazing Star in May 2007. This was based on a perceived decrease in the British Federation's emphasis on spirituality, with this new order choosing to re-emphasise this aspect of esoteric and 'inner working' Freemasonry.

Similar concerns of overreach from Paris and an increasing secularisation of Freemasonry also led to the establishment of The Grand Lodge of Freemasonry for Men and Women on 18 February 2001. The purpose of this Order was to offer Anglo-American Freemasonry in the style of UGLE and the women only Orders but for men and women on equal terms.

All of these splinter groups have belief in a Supreme Being as a requirement for membership, meaning that none of them recognise the British Federation they originate from as a regular Masonic body.

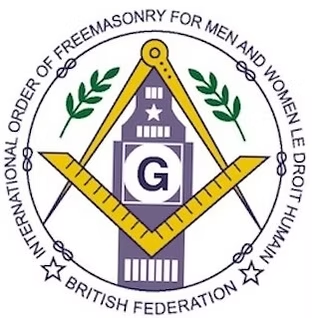

=== Structure ===
Members of the Federation meet in lodges under the leadership of a Right Worshipful Master. These lodges are organised into geographical areas, known as 'Orients'. In any area containing three of more craft lodges, an application may be made for permission to form an Association of Installed Masters. The primary role of such an Association is to assist at installations of a Right Worshipful Master and to provide instruction and guidance in the Installed Master ritual. Other tasks may be undertaken if appropriate.

The Federation administration is organised by multiple bodies. At the grassroots level, the National Convention is held annually with all members above the grade of Entered Apprentice entitled to vote on issues.

The National Council of the Federation is its administrative body, comprising 15 members, including a President, Secretary and Deputy-Secretary all elected triennially at the National Convention. Meetings are also attended by the Most Puissant Grand Commander (MPGC) of the British Federation who is the representative of the Supreme Council of the Order and must hold the 33° of the Ancient and Accepted Scottish Rite. They are also responsible for the side degrees worked by the Federation. The National Council's remit covers the administration of craft masonry and the higher and allied degrees, except the Federation finances, which are the responsibility of the Finance Committee.

The Finance Committee assists the Federation Treasurer to manage the Federation's funds, investments, accounts and annual budget. It also sets the rates payable by lodges and chapters for members' annual capitation fees, registration fees, charters, diplomas, endorsements and Masonic passports.

The MPGC is supported in the execution of their duties by the Triangle of the 33°.

=== Current activities ===
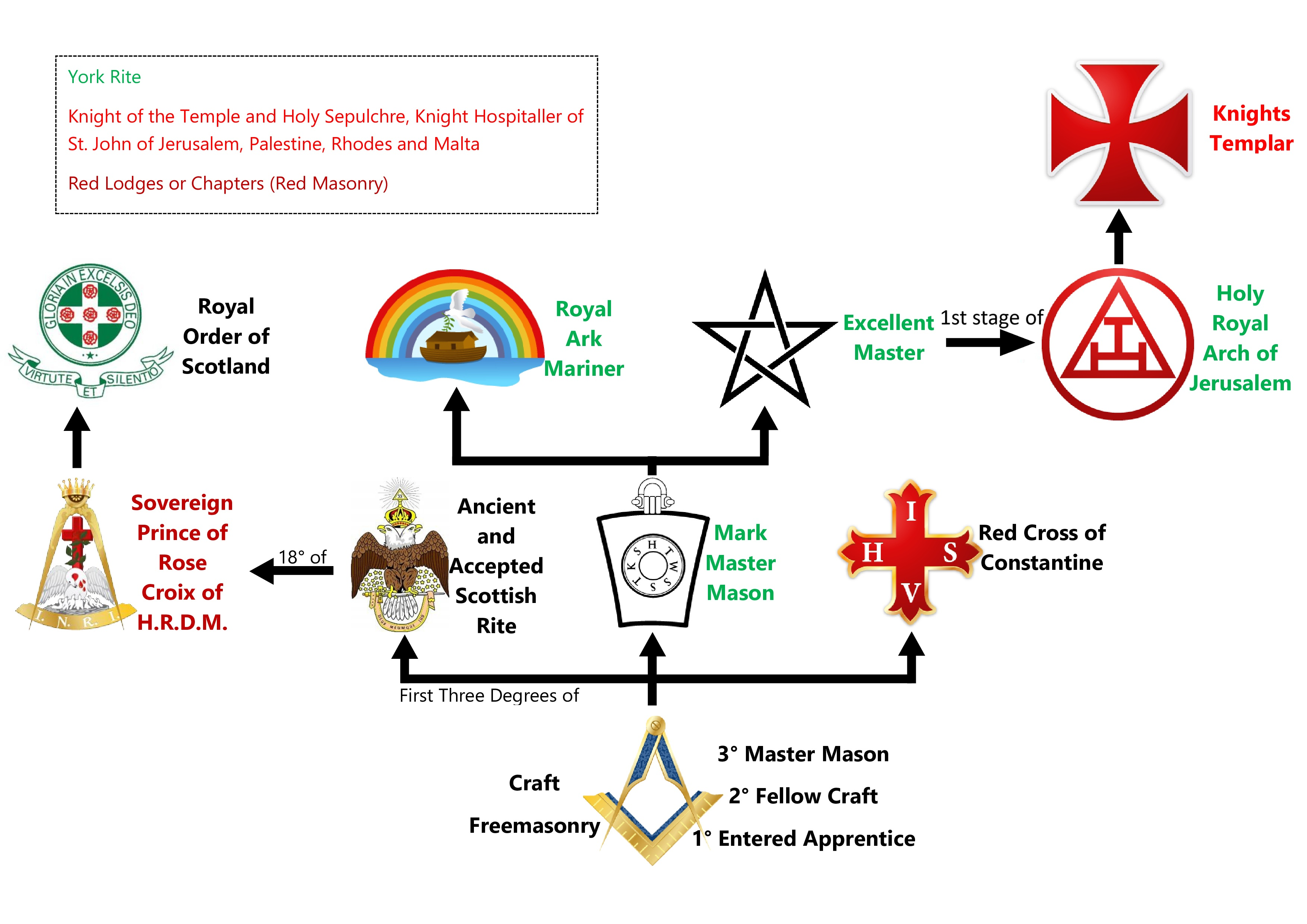
The Side Degrees of British Le Droit Humain

The stated aim of the Order in general, and thus the British Federation, is to use symbols to seek truth, both about the world and the individual. The Order promotes fraternity and works to the Glory of the Great Architect of the Universe and to the perfection of humanity.

The British Federation works the Ancient & Accepted Scottish Rite from the 1st to the 33rd degree inclusive. In addition the Allied Degrees of Mark, Royal Ark Mariner, Excellent Master, Holy Royal Arch of Jerusalem, Knights Templar, Royal Order of Scotland and Red Cross of Constantine are either worked or permitted.

The charitable arm of the Federation is the Co-Masonic Benevolent Fund, or CMBF, registered UK charity no. 205813. It is primarily concerned with alleviating poverty both in Britain and abroad, particularly of children. It also holds annual fundraising events for SPES UK, a branch of SPES International, which provides aid for orphaned children in Togo.

Annie Besant received special dispensation to require a belief in a Supreme Being in her ritual, contrary to the international Order and the Liberal Masonic tradition. However, the Federation today makes it clear that such a belief is not a prerequisite to membership.

== Portugal ==
The Portuguese Federation of Le Droit Humain (Portuguese: Ordem Maçónica Mista Internacional Le Droit Humain - Federação Portuguesa) was founded in 1923 by Adelaide Cabete. After the coup d'état of 28 May 1926 the dictatorial regime Estado Novo forbade masonry in the country and the order faded away. In 1980 a new lodge was opened and a new era for the Portuguese Federation of Le Droit Humain began.

== North America ==
Le Droit Humain is present in Canada, Mexico, and United States of America. The first lodge in the United States was founded on 25 October 1903, by Louis Goaziou.

== Asia ==
Le Droit Humain is present in the Philippines, Worshipful Lodge La Independencia No° 2157 Orient of Kawit Cavite and Worshipful Lodge Talakudong No° 2171 Orient of Tacurong City,Sultan Kudarat Province of Mindanao.

== Regularity and recognition ==
Le Droit Humain is in mutual amity with the following Orders (meaning recognition is reciprocal and members can intervisit):

- Women's Grand Lodge Of France
- Grand Orient de France
- Grand Orient of Belgium

== See also ==
- Women and Freemasonry
- Co-Freemasonry
- Belgian Federation of Le Droit Humain
- Le Droit Humain in Sweden
- Le Droit Humain in North America
- List of Freemasons
