= Women's Grand Lodge of France =

The Women's Grand Lodge of France (Grande Loge féminine de France) is the Grand Lodge of France's women-only Masonic lodges.

== History ==
Starting in the 18th century, a system of Masonic cooperation by adoption came to attention of the Masons' wives and families. Many of these wives were involved in Masonic activities, although they were forbidden from entering Freemasonry itself by its founding texts of 1723. The force exerted by militants like Flora Tristan, Louise Michel and Maria Deraismes was decisive, however, with Deraismes received and initiated into a male lodge in 1882 and founding, with Georges Martin, the Ordre maçonnique mixte international " le Droit humain " in 1893.

Female Freemasonry from then on became established, via the lodges of adoption, on which the male Freemasons unilaterally decided to confer autonomy in 1935. The following year 8 women's lodges came together to form the first "convent", the embryonic form of the future Women's Grand Lodge. They disappeared during the German occupation of France, with several members deported and others operating in secret and engaging in Resistance activity. In 1945, the first post-war convent re-formed under the presidency of Anne-Marie Gentily. In 1946, the jurisdiction was re-structured. In 1952, this "Union maçonnique féminine de France" officially became the Women's Grand Lodge of France. In 1959 it abandoned the rite of adoption in favour of the Ancient and Accepted Scottish Rite.

From the 1960s onwards, 21 lodges were formed in France and one in Switzerland at Geneva, the "Lutèce" lodge. During the following decade, 76 women's lodges were created in France, Switzerland and Belgium and other rites were accepted. The patent of the French Rite was sent to the GLFF by the Grand Orient de France and on 10 March 1973 the first lodge of the French rite, Unité, was formed, soon followed by many others. In 1972 the GLFF created the Women's Supreme Council of France.

== Functioning ==
The GLFF is administered by a federal council elected at the annual Convention.

== See also ==
- Freemasonry and women
- Le Droit Humain

== Bibliography ==
- Roger Dachez. Histoire de la franc-maçonnerie française. Paris: PUF, 2003. ISBN 2-13-053539-9
- Gilbert Garibal. Être franc-maçon aujourd'hui. Alleur (Belgium): Marabout, 1994. ISBN 2-501-02029-4
- Daniel Ligou, ed. Histoire des Francs-Maçons en France, vol. 2: 1815–2000. Toulouse: Privat, 2000. ISBN 2-7089-6839-4
