= Erwin von Steinbach =

German architect

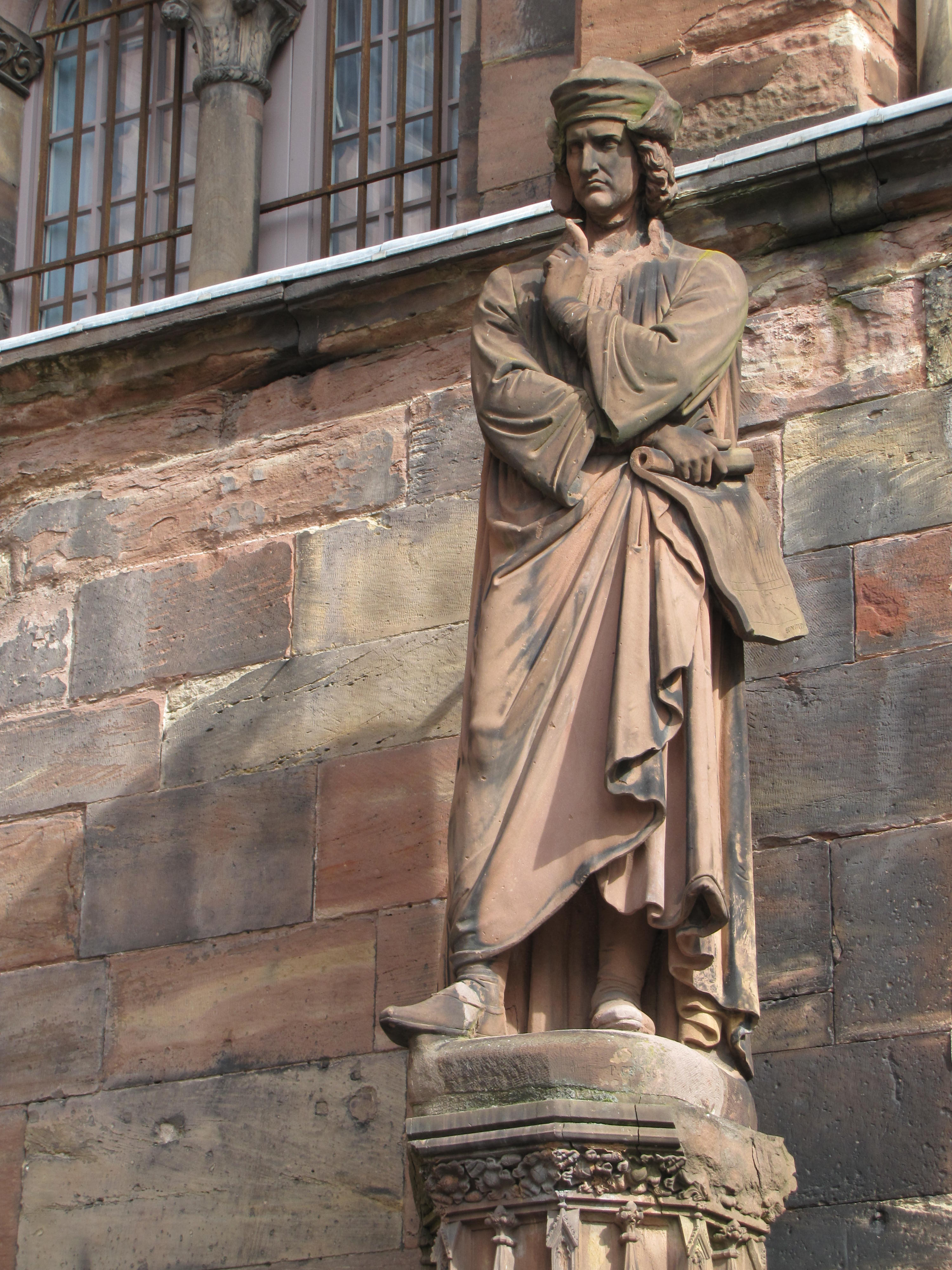
Erwin von Steinbach by Philippe Grass

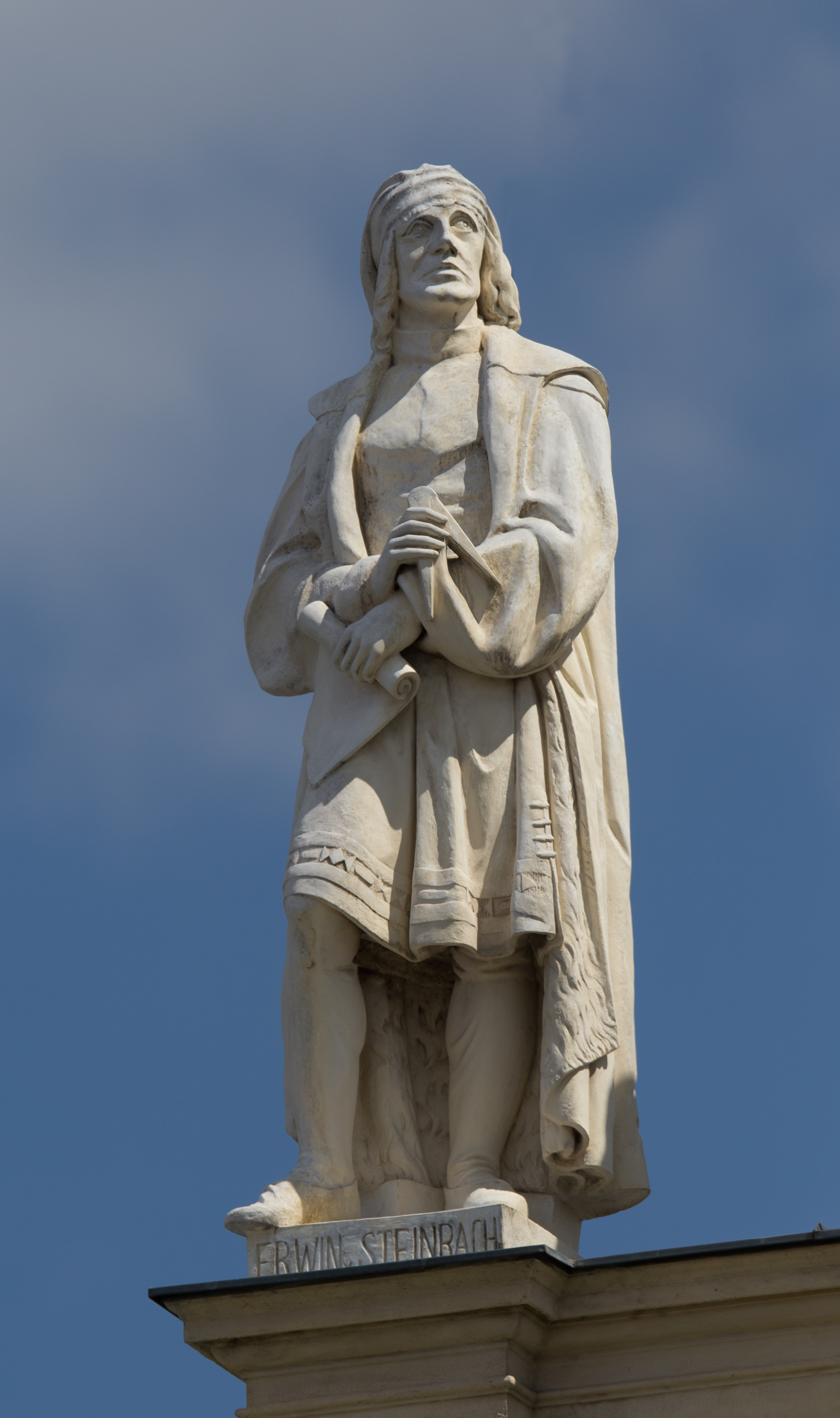
Steinbach, roof figure at the Kunsthistorisches Museum, Vienna

Erwin von Steinbach (c. 1244 – 17 January 1318) was a German architect, and was a central figure in the construction of the Strasbourg Cathedral.

== Biography ==
According to a tradition which arose in a later age, he was called Erwin von Steinbach, and a monument has been erected to him in the village of Steinbach, near Baden-Baden. Two of his sons, Erwin and Johannes, after them his grandson Gerlach, from 1341 to 1371 and, up to 1382, another scion of the family named Kuntze, were also superintending architects. Hence they were heads of the Straßburg guild of stonemasons, the influence of which extended as far as Bavaria, Austria, and the borders of Italy. No written account exists as to the training for his work which the elder Erwin received. It must, however, be taken for granted that he had proved his abilities as a master-builder in other places before he was entrusted with the construction of the façade of Notre-Dame de Strasbourg about the year 1277.

Steinbach's son Gerlach later constructed the Niederhaslach Church, a modest but artistically highly valuable building not far from Strasbourg.

== Strasbourg Cathedral ==
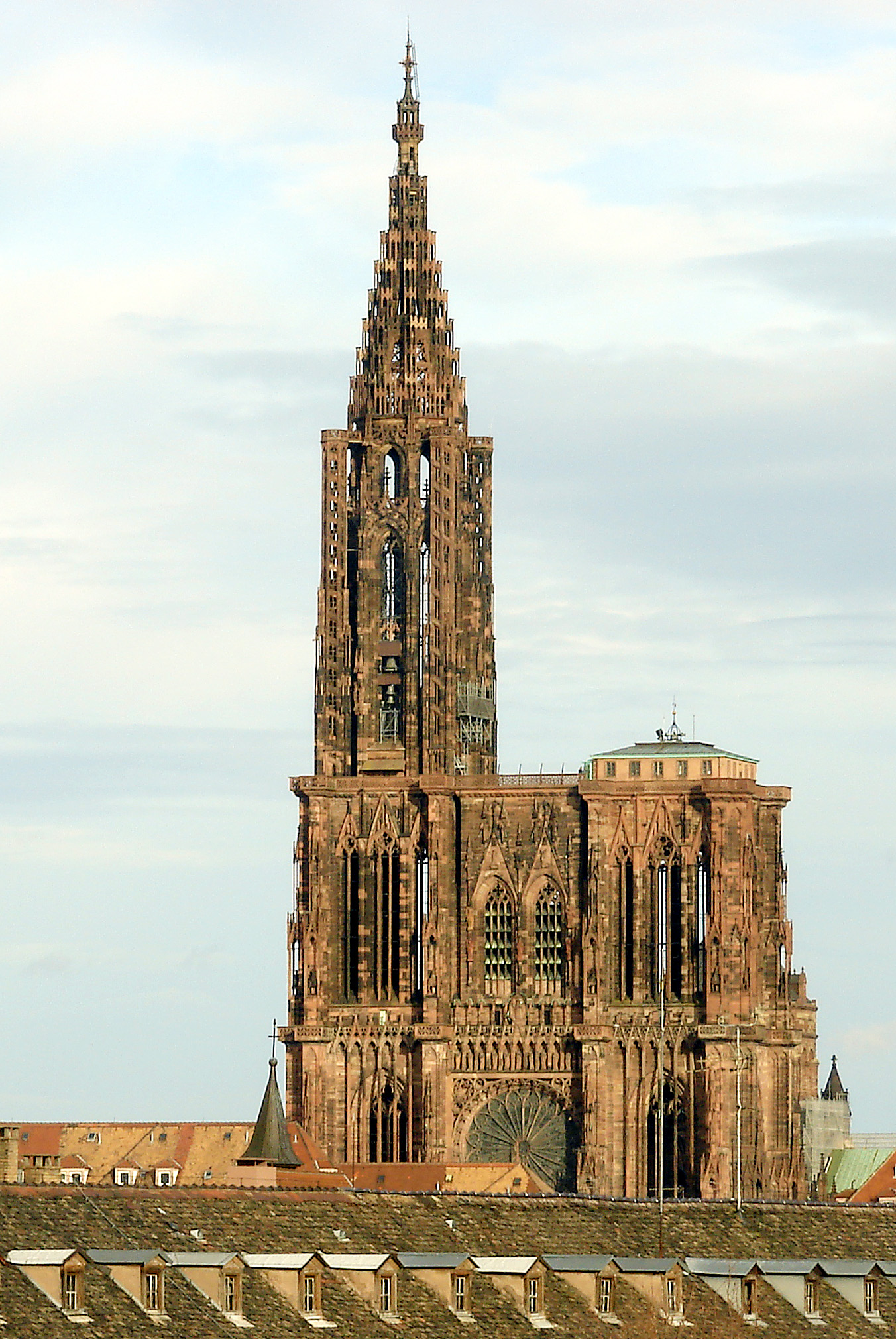
Erwin von Steinbach's Notre-Dame de Strasbourg was the world's tallest building from 1625 to 1874

His work on the cathedral shows the influence of the French Gothic. When Erwin took charge of the construction, the cathedral was completed except the porch of the tower, and reflected in its parts the development of architectural styles from the first quarter of the eleventh century. In fact, the west front was now built by three masters, of whom one was Erwin. At the same time a part of the nave damaged by fire in 1298 had to be repaired. Three plans of the façade are still in existence; according to German art historian Georg Dehio, the best design belongs to Erwin, to whom it is customary to ascribe the entire construction. Eichborn, however, has tried to prove that Erwin drew the weakest of the three plans. In any case the three master architects by their joint work deserve the praise that, especially since the days of Johann Wolfgang von Goethe, has been assigned to Erwin alone.

They are not responsible, however, for the ungraceful central screen of the third story between the towers, nor for the pinnacle of the north tower. This front offers a happy combination of horizontal members in the French style with the German principle of daring height. The rose window, also French in design and placed in the central one of the nine fields, gives a welcome point of rest to the eye. The somewhat peculiar ornamentation consists of a double tracery of bars and geometrical designs which covers the façade like a net dividing and filling the large surfaces. By the novelty and the daring of the new style the individual members of this façade are in marked contrast to the older parts of the building; the front, moreover, is connected directly with the body of the cathedral. The ornamental sculpture of the building, which is richer than that ordinarily found in German cathedrals, is attributed to Erwin's workshop, from which came also the monument to Conrad of Lichtenberg (1240–1299) in the chapel of St. John. In this chapel the early Gothic forms correspond to the carving in the chapter-hall. Erwin's last work was the construction of the beautiful chapel of the Blessed Virgin. The legend of the female sculptor Sabina von Steinbach, who, it is asserted, was a daughter of Erwin, rests on a mistaken interpretation of the words of a scroll. The inscriptions referring to Erwin, which along with tradition are our only sources of information, have also given rise to various doubts.
