= 27 Pembridge Gardens =

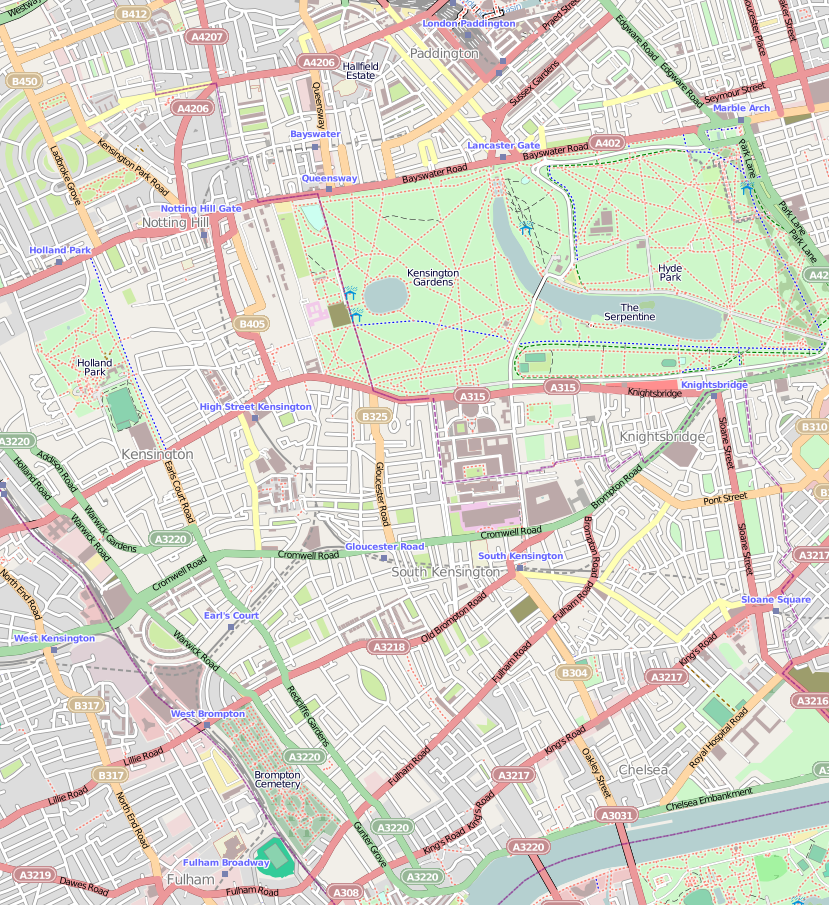
- Location within Kensington
- 51°30′38.3″N 0°11′47.5″W
- Location: London, England
- OS grid reference: TQ 25270 80630

History
- Built: 19th century

Listed Building – Grade II
- Designated: 07-Nov-1984
- Reference no.: 1331672

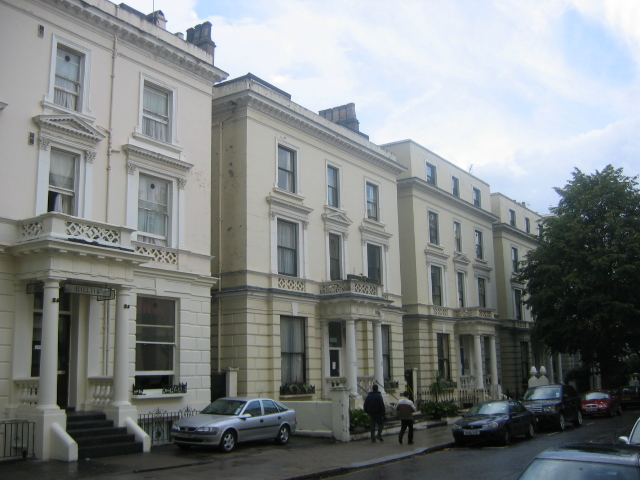
Pembridge Gardens, 2006

27 Pembridge Gardens is a heritage building located in the Notting Hill Gate area of London. The building is a Grade II listed building, dating from the mid-19th century.

It is a 3-storey building, stuccoed, with rustication. It has a small Doric-style central entrance porch, pediments on the first floor windows, and is "part of unified scheme with Nos 2–34, 1–25, 29 and Pembridge Square."

Since 1924 it has been occupied by the Order of Women Freemasons and is used as the order's headquarters.
