= Co-Freemasonry =

Form of Freemasonry which admits both men and women

Co-Freemasonry (or Co-Masonry) is a form of Freemasonry which admits both men and women. The first known co-masonic lodge was created 24 December 1784 as the mother lodge La Sagesse Triomphante in Lyon, France by Alessandro Cagliostro. Cagliostro formed this lodge with his wife and a few other couples. Later in France during the 1890s, Le Droit Humain formed, and is now an international movement represented by several Co-Freemasonic administrations throughout the world. Traditional male-only Masonic Lodges do not recognise Co-Freemasonry, holding it to be irregular. Several prominent members of the Theosophical Society, including Annie Besant, joined Co-Freemasonry and introduced it wherever they took Theosophy.

== Organisations ==
=== Le Droit Humain ===
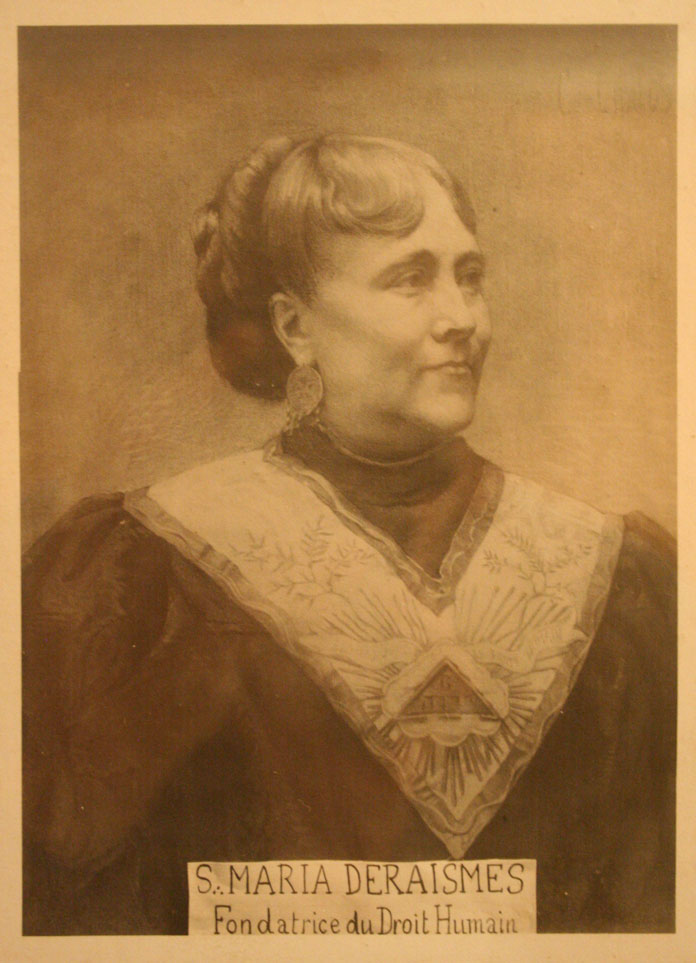
Maria Deraismes (left) and Georges Martin (right) are amongst the co-founders of Le Droit Humain.

The International Order of Freemasonry for Men and Women Le Droit Humain was founded in France in the late nineteenth century, during a period of strong feminist and women's suffrage campaigning. It was the first Co-Masonic Order, and also the first truly international Masonic Order. Today it has approximately 32,000 members from over 60 countries worldwide on all 5 continents. Geographically it is organized into 41 federations, 8 jurisdictions and 20 pioneer lodges.

French Masonry had long attempted to include women, the Grand Orient de France having allowed Rites of Adoption as early as 1774, by which Lodges could "adopt" sisters, wives and daughters of Freemasons, imparting to them the mysteries of several degrees.

In 1879, following differences among members of the Supreme Council of France, twelve lodges withdrew from it and founded the Grande Loge Symbolique Ecossaise (GLSE). One of these Lodges, Les Libres Penseurs (The Free Thinkers) in Le Pecq, reserved in its charter the right to initiate women as Freemasons, proclaiming the essential equality of man and woman.

On January 14, 1882, Maria Deraismes, a well-known humanitarian, feminist author and lecturer, was initiated into Les Libres Penseurs, after the lodge withdrew from its Grand Lodge. The Worshipful Master, Bro. Houbron, justified this act as having the highest interests of humanity at heart, and as being a perfectly logical application of the principle of "A Free Mason in a Free Lodge".

In 1890 the Lodge La Jérusalem Écossaise, also of the Grande Loge Symbolique Ecossaise, petitioned other Lodges for the establishment of a new order of Freemasonry that would accept both men and women. This time La Jérusalem Lodge did not propose to initiate women itself, but to create a new order working in parallel. The main proponent of this was Dr. Georges Martin, a French senator, advocate of equal rights for women, and also a member of Les Libres Penseurs.

On March 14, 1893, Deraismes, Martin and several other male Freemasons founded La Respectable Loge, Le Droit Humain, Maçonnerie Mixte (Worshipful Lodge, Human Rights, Co-Masonry) in Paris. They initiated, passed and raised sixteen prominent French women.

Shortly after, on April 4 of the same year, the first Grand Lodge of Co-Freemasonry was established, the Grande Loge Symbolique Écossaise Mixte de France (Grand Lodge of Mixed Scottish Rite Freemasonry of France), which would later become known as the International Order of Co-Freemasonry "Le Droit Humain". This was a radical departure from most other forms of Freemasonry, for not only did the new order not require belief in a Supreme Being (the Grand Orient de France had discarded this requirement in 1877)—it opened its doors to all of humanity who were "... just, upright and free, of mature age, sound judgment and strict morals."

As early as 1895 the Lodge Le Droit Humain (with no number) was travelling around—to Vernon, Blois, Rouen and Havre, in what were called selections—it gave conference and started to hold initiations in the presence, every time, of a large audience Lodge Nr.1 was thus created in Blois in 1895, but, permanently excluded in 1902, this lodge re-awoke only recently. Its Mother Lodge Le Droit Humain now took over the position of Lodge Nr.1 whilst splitting up again in Paris to form Lodge Nr.4. Three lodges were founded in the provinces:

Lodge Nr.1 in Lyon (1896)
Lodge Nr.3 in Rouen (1896) and
Lodge Nr.5 in Havre (1902)

The first News-sheet of co-masonry appeared in January, 1895. It contained an article by Georges Martin enunciating the principles of LE DROIT HUMAIN as well as various rules regarding to membership lists, subscription fees (11 francs for an initiation, and 20–31 francs for an increase of wages), the price of diplomas (5 francs), the annual subscription rate (18 francs) and the price of subscription to the Newssheet (2 francs per year).

As a base for comparison: 1871 the average wage of a worker was 4.98 frcs. A woman earned half of this sum. In 1882 a clerk at a Ministry earned 1500–2000 frcs per year. One week's stay in Paris in 1900 for the International Exhibition cost about 100 frcs. The co-masonic News-Sheets appeared regularly until 1914—their publication was interrupted during the war, but some editions were published in French in America.

==== The Eastern Federation ====
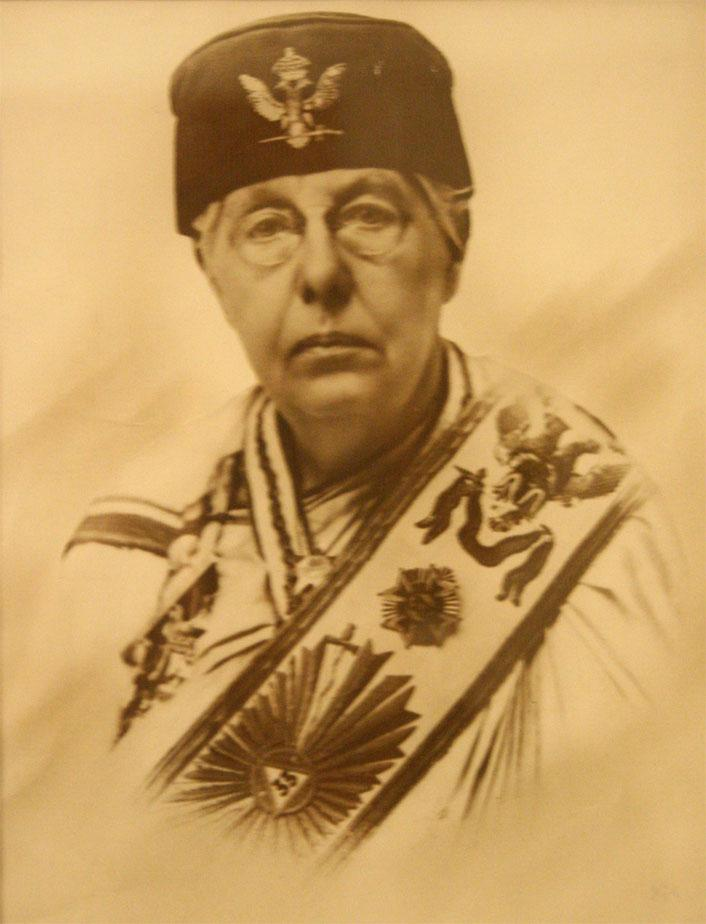
Annie Besant wearing 33° Masonic regalia

Several prominent members of the Theosophical Society joined Co-Freemasonry, including Annie Besant, George Arundale, Charles W. Leadbeater and C. Jinarajadasa. Henceforth, wherever they took Theosophy, they also introduced Co-Freemasonry.

The Order of Universal Co-Freemasonry in Great Britain and the British Dependencies was founded by Annie Besant and officers of the Supreme Council of the French Maçonnerie Mixte (known today as The International Order of Freemasonry for Men and Women, Le Droit Humain) on September 26, 1902, with the consecration of Lodge Human Duty No. 6 in London. Besant remained head of the Order until her death in 1933. The English working, influenced by the Theosophy of its leading members, restored certain Masonic practices not required in the French working, notably that its members hold a belief in God or a Supreme Being. The permission received from France to reinstate this in the English workings is known as the "Annie Besant Concord", and in 1904 a new English ritual was printed, which firmly established this requirement as central to the work. The revised ritual was called the "Dharma Ritual", also known as the "Besant-Leadbeater" and more recently as the "Lauderdale" working. The Dharma Ritual also attempted to restore prominence to esoteric and mystical aspects that its Theosophically-minded authors felt were the heart of Freemasonry, so that it became foremostly a spiritual organisation; Co-Freemasonry of this Order was therefore sometimes called "Occult Freemasonry". Leadbeater served of the presiding officer of the Sydney Lodge #404 and various lodges and chapters of the York and Scottish Rites.

==== Defection of Lodges from Le Droit Humain ====
Le Droit Humain's Grand Commander, Brian Roberts, in 2002 said:

"Article 8 of the International Constitution of our Order states that our lodges throughout the world 'work to the Great Architect of the Universe [GAOTU] and/or to the Perfection of Humanity'. In other words, lodges may choose to work to either or both. The British Federation has always worked to both. ... It is correct that some Federations within our Order, particularly but not exclusively those in Europe, work to the perfection of humanity and not to the GAOTU. As you will have seen from the above, Federations may work to either or to both, as the International Constitution permits them to do. The International Order of Co-Freemasonry Le Droit Humain has its own Supreme Council and does not derive its authority from the Grand Orient of France or any other body. The International Order of Co-Freemasonry is not French."

The defection of the British Lodges was the latest in the past two decades. In 2001 the Grand Lodge of Freemasonry for Men and Women was formed by expelled and suspended members of the Consistory Council of the "Le Droit Humain" British Federation for refusing to drop the requirement for a belief in a Supreme Being. The Eastern Order of International Co-Freemasonry formed later, as did a few other smaller orders.

Other lodges, including those in Australia and South Africa and United States lodges, opted to remain affiliated with the Supreme Council of the International Order of Freemasonry for Men and Women, LE DROIT HUMAIN, and continue to exist as the British, Australian, South African and American Federations of the Order, governed by the Representative of the Supreme Council, known as the Most Puissant Grand Commander, who holds the 33rd and highest degree of the Order. Those remaining in LE DROIT HUMAIN permit each Lodge to decide its own invocation, respecting the liberty of individuals to practice Freemasonry, in the pursuit of Truth, without the imposition of Dogma. Thus within different Federations and Jurisdictions of DROIT HUMAN significant variation in method of work will be seen.

The 2017 International Convention ratified the past invocations found in the constitution and Lodges and Masonic bodies of LE DROIT HUMAIN may still work to the glory of The Great Architect of the Universe [TGAOTU] and/or to the Perfection of Humanity' as they have always done.

==== Netherlands and the Dutch East Indies ====
The first co-masonic Dutch lodge was solemnly installed in Amsterdam on Saturday, 10 June 1905, by the Grand Mistress Marie-Georges Martin and the Grand Orator Georges Martin, with distinctive name Cazotte Nr. 13.

Various lodges were subsequently founded in The Hague (Nr.41 in 1911), in Hilversum (Nr.43 in 1913), in Rotterdam (Nr.92 in 1915), in Arnhem (nr.74 in 1916) and again in Amsterdam (Nr. 53).

Co-Freemasonry was also introduced to the Dutch East Indies when W.B. Fricke founded on the island of Java, Lodge Lux Orientis Nr.402 followed in Surabaya in 1913, Lodge Nr. 421 in Semarang and Lodge Nr.422 in Bandung in 1915. (Lodges Nrs. 402 and 422 still active). One lodge was even installed on the island of Sumatra in Medan.

The Supreme Council designated its Representative for the Dutch lodges and for those in the Dutch colonies who formed one complete Jurisdiction. (It was not until 1919 that the lodges in the Dutch East Indies became independent of the Dutch Jurisdiction). Van Ginkei was designated as representative of the Supreme Council for the Dutch Jurisdiction.

==== Belgium ====
The first lodge of Le Droit Humain was founded in Brussels in 1911, after a long period of incubation during which eminent members of the Maçonnerie Mixte Ecossaise de France worked patiently to convince the Progressives to accept a masonry working in a world without frontiers.

At the Congress on Free Thought of 1895, Louise Barberousse, Senior Deacon of the Lodge Nr.1 Le Droit Humain introduced co-masonry to Brussels and showed its Bulletin.

==== Switzerland ====
After the permanent exclusion of the Zürich Lodge in 1905, founding of a new lodge was concentrated in Geneva which became the centre of many worldwide organisations.

Having worked as a Triangle for three years, Lodge Nr.44 in the Order of Geneva was solemnly installed by Georges Martin on 6 April 1913 in the presence of about twenty Brethren from the Grand Lodge of Switzerland Alpina and the ceremony was followed with the initiation of a candidate.

The first worshipful master was brother Reelfs, who was born in Amsterdam in 1888. He later moved to Switzerland in 1906, after completing his studies in The Hague. Brother Reelfs was multi-lingual, speaking Dutch, English, German, Greek and French. He would become the Professor of Literature at Madame Rollier's school, who herself later became a pioneer of Le Droit Humain in Switzerland, and also initiated as worshipful master of the lodge in Lausanne.

Having been a member of Lodge Nr.13 Cazotte in Amsterdam, Bro Reelfs was, at that time of the consecration of Lodge Nr.44, a member of both Grand Lodge of Switzerland Alpina and of the Grant Orient de France, and was invested with the 18th Degree. He could not prevent the closure of the lodge during the war because members of foreign nationalities were obliged to return home where some were called up for military service. As to Reelfs ha was to prove his worth after the war.

==== Australia ====
The Australian Federation consists of four Craft Lodges working the Lauderdale Ritual and one Symbolic Lodge working the A.:.A.:.S.:.R.:. Georges Martin ritual, meeting in New South Wales, Victoria and South Australia. An itinerant Lodge will be opened in 2024 under the Charter of the Mother Lodge of Australia (formerly Victorian Lodge) to cater for travelling, distant and retiring members. In addition to the craft/symbolic degrees, Sovereign Chapters Rose-Croix, Areopagi of the 30th degree, a Tribunal and Consistory also operate. Several degrees of the York Rite are worked in Australia.

Possibly the best known Australian Freemason of the Order, was Sister Edith D. Cowan, the first woman elected to an Australian parliament (WA) who was an active member of the former St Cuthbert's Lodge No.416. One of her most interesting retorts in parliament, possibly with veiled Masonic import was in response to Member Latham, who tried to scold Sister Edith when he demanded "Surely, Mrs Cowan, you do not intend to lower women to the level of men?"to which she replied "No, Mr Latham, I intend to raise men to the level of women!".

The Sydney Lodge #404 was once headed by Charles Leadbeater who co-authored the Lauderdale ritual used by many gender inclusive Lodges today.

==== United States ====
The origins and development of Le Droit Humain in the US cannot be separated from the life and activity of one of its primary founders, the Frenchman Louis Goaziou.

Born in Brittany, France in 1864, he emigrated to the US in 1881, where he worked in the coal mines of Houtsdale, Pennsylvania. Three years later he married Marie Bourgeois, born in Namur in 1866. Goaziou wanted to improve the appalling working conditions of miners and set up, in 1866, the Association of United Miners, as well as two Associations for mutual help, whose aims he defended in a weekly French speaking magazine. Through this he attracted the attention of a professor of French at Columbia University in New York, Antoine Muzarelli, founding member of the New York Lodge La'Atlantide laboring under the Grand Orient de France. It was Muzzarelli who contacted Le Droit Humain's then Grand Master and Co-Founder George Martin, offering to found Lodges in North American for Le Droit Humain. In this way, Muzzarelli became the founder of Co-Freemasonry in North America.

The humanitarian ideal of the new Masonic order struck him as absolutely compatible with the Socialist ideas of Louis Goaziou. Muzzarelli contacted Goaziou in 1903 with the idea of creating in Charleroi (Pennsylvania) either a Lodge under the Grand Orient. He did not inform Goaziou of the option to form the Lodge of under Le Droit Humain, into which their wives also could be admitted, until he arrived in Charleroi in October 1903 to institute the Lodge. The charter members decided they would found the Lodge under Le Droit Humain. The first three degrees were conferred on them by Antoine Muzarelli, and over two days, October 18 and 19, 1903, the first Co-masonic American lodge, Alpha No 301 was born in Charleroi, Pennsylvania. Louis Goaziou became the first Worshipful Master.

This French speaking Lodge continued until 1973. Six other Lodges were founded in 1904, three working in French, one in Slav, one in Italian and one in English (under the direction of John Goaziou, a brother of Louis). Soon Lodges were founded in Chicago, St. Louis and in California. The Rose-Croix degrees were given to Louis Goaziou by communication in November, 1904 (please note, Goaziou's Grand Lodge Eternal record in Larkspur, CO, indicates he received this degree from Muzzarelli September 1, 1905) and he became a member of Chapter Nr.1 in the valley of Paris. The first American Chapter (Nr.?) was formed in Charleroi with six charter members.

It was Muzzarelli who conferred upon Goaziou the Degrees of the Scottish Rite up to the 30th. Muzzarelli named Goaziou his deputy in early 1907. Unfortunately, the two men fell out over mutual charges of financial irregularity combined with personal dislike. The Order also was in disarray because too many Lodges had been founded too quickly. The new Order also experienced external pressures, including persecution by the existing Male-Only Orders in the US. In the fall of 1908, Muzzarelli was pressured to call what remained of the Lodges he founded, just less than half, to a convention in St. Louis, Missouri. Tragically, Muzzarelli, who in addition to pressures in the Order also had many personal problems, committed suicide October 15, 1908. Though Goaziou made it plain he would prefer the presidency go to another Co-Mason, it was Goaziou who took charge of the financial and administrative affairs of the lodges, and who was elected President at the convention in St. Louis.

The American Federation of Human Rights had received charter from the US Government in 1907 but it was at the 1908 convention that the American Federation was officially constituted. The 31st, 32nd and the 33rd degrees of the Scottish Rite were conferred on him on 21 November 1909, and he was designated by the Supreme Council as its Representative for the American Federation.

The same year Annie Besant was staying in the USA where she installed an English speaking lodge in Chicago and granted the degree of Installed Master to certain members- a degree which did not exist either in the Grand Orient or the Scottish Rite (a version of this degree exists in Muzzarelli's journal, apparently around 1905, so it's not universally agreed that Besant introduced this degree into the AFHR). A new trend began in American Co-masonry. Whilst some members of French and Italian origin, mainly recruited in the mining industry, had concentrated on social problems, other Masons entered the AFHR to try to bring the Order under Theosophic influence, seeing in the Ancient Mysteries the origins of masonry. So long as Goaziou was alive and Grand Commander of the Order, the AFHR followed a middle path between these two extremes

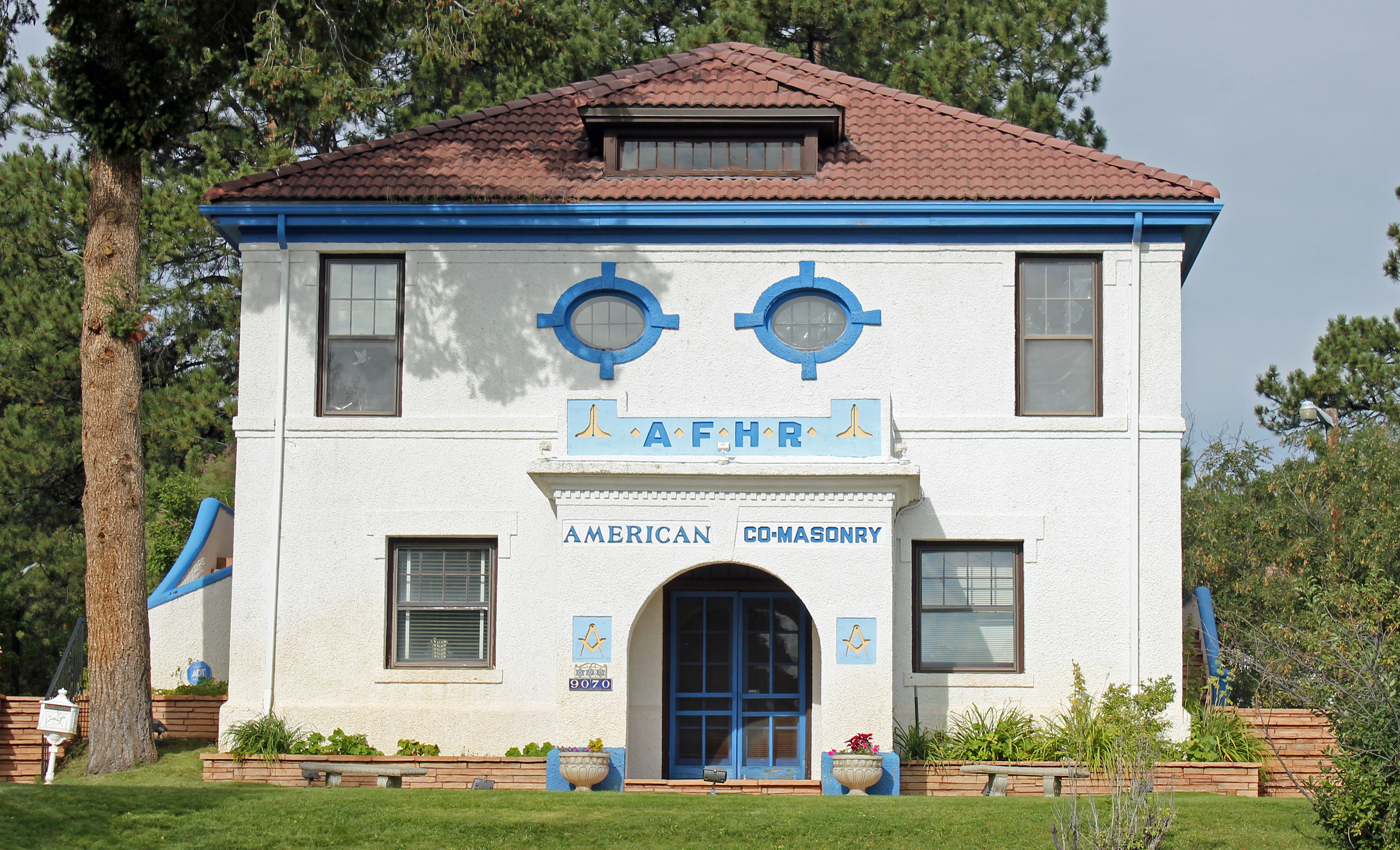
American Federation of Human Rights Headquarters, Larkspur, Colorado

When the 1914-1918 war ended, operative work started by Louis Goaziou recommenced. Headquarters in Larkspur Colorado was established in 1916. Within a few years, the mortgage of the property was paid off. The administrative building in Larkspur was built between 1921–1924 in order to replace the first building, which had become too small; this building was later listed on the National Register of Historic Places. In 1922 the potash mines in Colorado went bankrupt and this led to about 100 Italian members of Le Droit Humain losing their jobs. Despite their real interest for the building of Larkspur, many of these miners felt they had no option but to leave Masonry. In addition to these departures, an economic downturn have taken hold in North American. It was no longer possible, through lack of funds, to realize the initial project to construct, next door to the administrative offices at Larkspur, an orphanage and a home for the elderly. However Louis Goaziou's hard effort to achieve these goals were not successful. With the coming of the Great Depression, membership went into steep decline, which did not recover until after World War II, in the time of his successor, Edith Armour.

=== The Honorable Order of Universal Co-Masonry ===
On April 11, 1994, The American Federation of Human Rights formed The Honorable Order of American Co-Masonry under the authority of 11 members of the Sovereign Grand Inspector General (S.G.I.G.) of the Thirty-Third Degree. Formerly known as American Co-Masonry, this now-independent obedience, which has its headquarters in Larkspur, Colorado, has since become a Co-Masonic organization in the United States and has established Lodges in Brazil, Chile, and Argentina. In 2017, the Order elected to rename itself to Universal Co-Masonry due to its expansion into countries outside of the United States.

== Recognition of Co-Freemasonry ==
Co-Freemasonry is not formally recognised by any of the larger male-only Masonic Grand Lodges in the US in as much as intervisitation or other Masonic interaction is not permitted.

A Landmark of Freemasonry agreed by the 51 mainstream Grand Lodges in the US is that the initiation of women is forbidden and members take a binding obligation not to countenance the initiation of women. There are many other regular Grand Lodges outside the US that maintain both as a "Landmark", including the United Grand Lodge of England, the Grand Lodge of Scotland, the Grand Lodge of Ireland, the Grand East of the Netherlands and the Grand Lodge of South Africa who all consider each other to be "Regular" (abiding by the same rules) and so allow their members to visit freely between these constitutions.

Certain Grand Lodges of Co-Freemasonry, those under Le Droit Humain, also follow the lead of the Grand Orient de France in removing references to the Supreme Being from their rituals and initiating atheists; this is a further point of separation from typical Masonic Lodges which hold belief in a Supreme Being to be a Landmark requirement.

Notwithstanding the prohibition of interaction in a ritual context, the United Grand Lodge of England (UGLE), the oldest of the Grand Lodges, whilst not recognising Co-Freemasonry, states that it does hold informal discussions from time to time with Women's and Co-Masonic Grand Lodges on issues of mutual concern, and that

Brethren are therefore free to explain to non-Masons, if asked, that Freemasonry is not confined to men (even though this Grand Lodge does not itself admit women).

The Grand Orient de France did not initiate women for many years, but it does now and it recognizes Masonic bodies that do. Thus, it allows visitation by women from those bodies.

== See also ==
- Liberal Freemasonry
- Grand Orient de France
- Le Droit Humain
- Women and Freemasonry
- Yellow Rose (society)
- List of Freemasons
