= Conrad of Lichtenberg =

Bishop of Strasbourg (1240–1299)

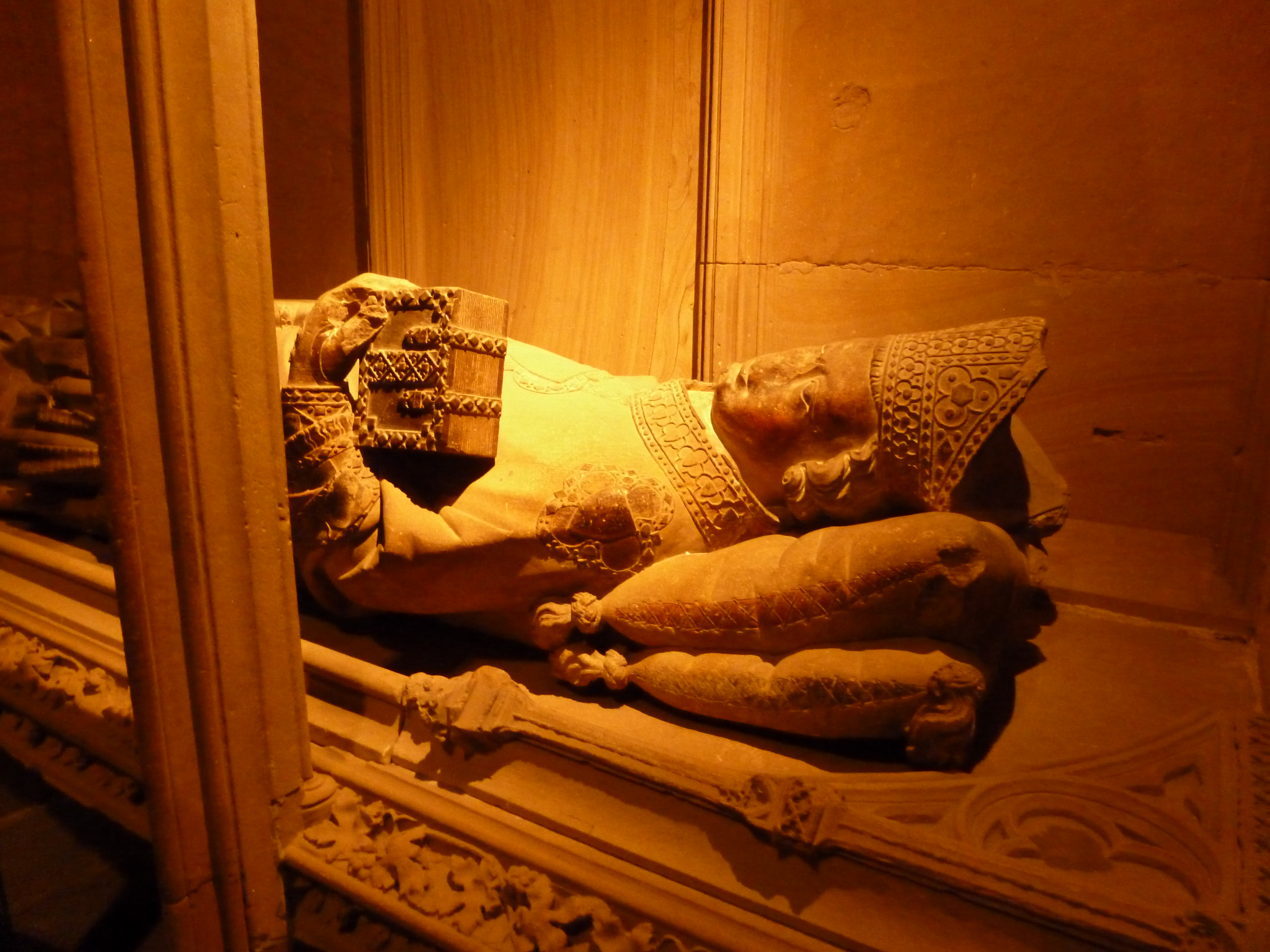
Tombstone of Conrad of Lichtenberg

Conrad of Lichtenberg (German: Konrad von Lichtenberg; French: Conrad de Lichtenberg; c. 1240 – 1 August 1299) was a bishop of Strasbourg in the 13th century.

Lichtenberg was born around 1240 to a wealthy family and entered the clergy at the age of 13. He was elected Bishop of Strasbourg in 1273. He died in combat while supporting his brother-in-law Egino against the city of Freiburg on 1 August 1299.

Credit is given to Lichtenberg for the construction of the Western facade of Notre-Dame de Strasbourg, realized by German architect Erwin von Steinbach (1244–1318). Lichtenberg is buried there in Chapel Saint Jean.

The Château de Lichtenberg in Alsace, France remains today.

Catholic Church titles
Preceded by Heinrich IV von Geroldseck	Bishop of Strasbourg; 1273–1299	Succeeded by Friedrich I von Lichtenberg
