= Sabina von Steinbach =

German sculptor

Sabina von Steinbach was – according to legend – a female stonemason living in Alsace (in what is now eastern France) during the 13th century. She is said to have been the daughter of Erwin von Steinbach, architect and master builder at Notre-Dame de Strasbourg, the cathedral in Strasbourg. When after her father's death her brother Johann continued to build the cathedral tower from 1318 to 1339, Sabina is believed to have been employed as a skillful mason and sculptor in its completion. There are, however, strong doubts as to whether she existed.

== Work ==
Sabina is traditionally considered responsible for the statues personifying the Church and the Synagogue (both 13th century), which are located near the south portals of the cathedral.

The tradition of Sabina as a mason in Strasbourg, constantly cited, appears to have been first published in 1617 Summum Argentoratensivm Templum by Oseas Schadaeus in his description of Strasbourg Cathedral. This understanding may have derived from the interpretation of a – now lost – Latin inscription on a scroll held by the figure of St. John: GRATIA DIVINÆ PIETATIS ADESTO SAVINÆ DE PETRADVRA PERQVAM SVM FACTA FIGURA. It translated: "Thanks to the piety of this woman, Sabina, who has given me form from this hard stone."

== Women stonemasons ==
Women were admitted to membership in the majority of the medieval craft guilds, but membership in a guild did not carry with it the right of being apprenticed, although it implied that a female member might share in all its benefits, pious and pecuniary, and in the event of her husband’s death (he being a master) might carry on his trade. This was easily done with the help of a managing journeyman and it is well known that provision was made for the journeyman's promptly acquiring the master’s rights by marrying such a widow. Stonemasons often traveled to distant sites for work that might be decades in construction and would naturally have taken their wives and children with them.

Von Steinbach's employment of his daughter Sabina among the Strasbourg stonemasons was not merely an irregularity perpetrated by a provincial lodge, lax in the proper guild observances. Until the capture of the city by France in 1681, the headquarters of the German stonemasons was in Strasbourg (even as late as 1760 the Strasbourg lodge still claimed tribute from the lodges of Germany). Indeed, American historian Albert Mackey, in his Encyclopedia of Freemasonry, cites the theory "which places the organization of the Order of Freemasonry at the building of the Cathedral of Strasbourg, in the year 1275."

Some contend that Sabina took over the contract on her father's job at Strasbourg after the master builder died and brought it to completion. Others maintain that she merely assisted her father. Still others maintain that Sabina completed the cathedral by herself, aided by "magic," when other stonemasons refused to work with her.

== Doubts about the existence of Sabina von Steinbach ==
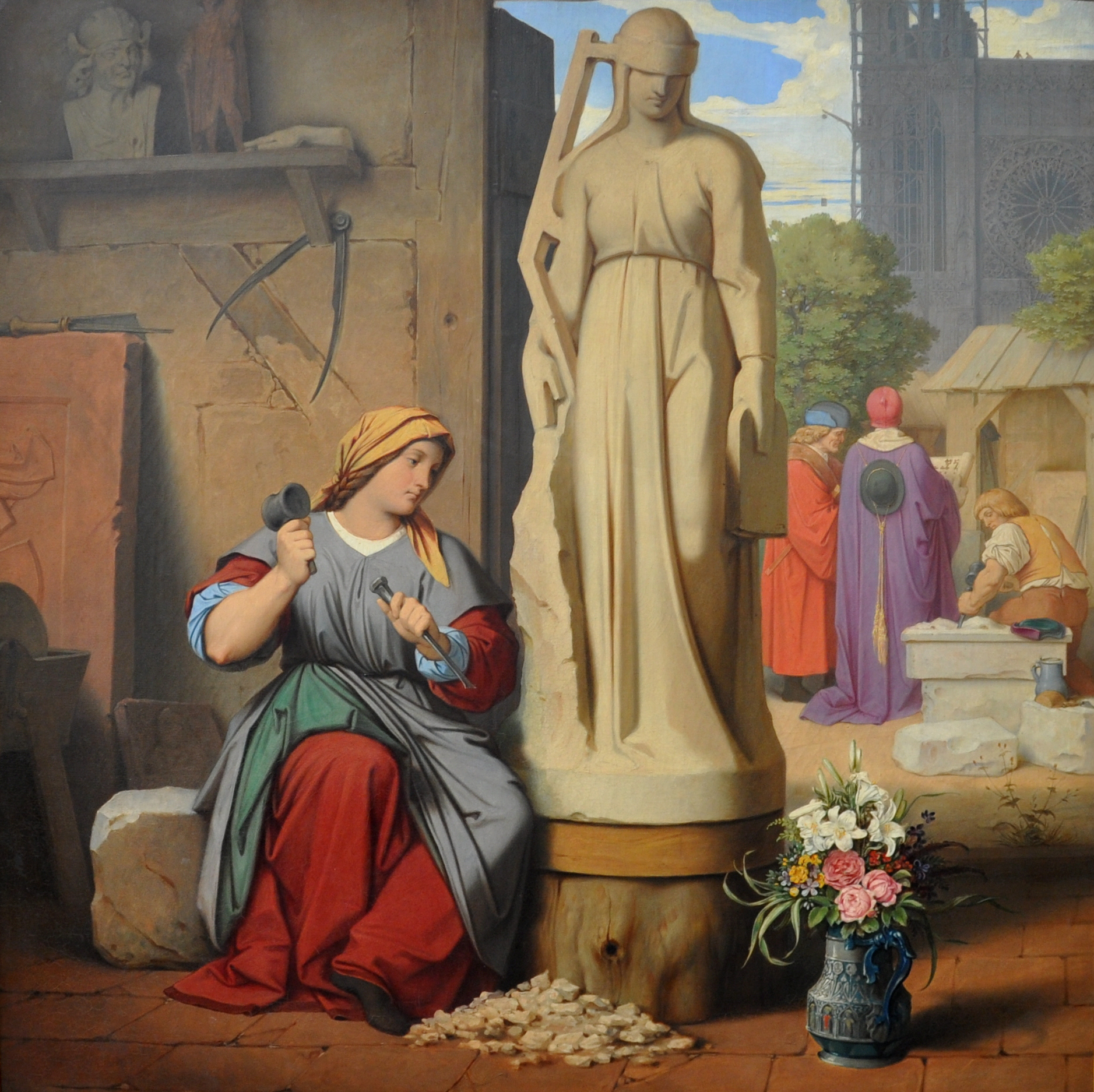
Painting by Moritz von Schwind, 1844

Art historians, over the past few decades, have cast doubt upon the story of Sabina von Steinbach. They base their doubts on a number of discrepancies, including a re-examination of the now lost inscription on scroll held by the figure of St. John, the sculpture attributed to Sabina. Art historian Leslie Ross, in her Artists of the Middle Ages (Greenwood Publishing Group, 2003), argues that Sabina’s story likely was created to further romanticize her supposed father’s story. For while there is no doubt Erwin von Steinbach did exist, so little is known about him that he, in fact, had to be "discovered". Ross writes:

Erwin's daughter, Sabina von Steinbach, was also 'discovered' in the nineteenth century. Based on a (now lost) inscription on one of the sculptures on the exterior of the Strasbourg cathedral (naming a 'Savinae'), a nineteenth-century scholar attributed several famous sculptures both on the exterior and interior of the cathedral to the previously unacknowledged but extremely skillful female sculptor, Sabina von Steinbach, the daughter of Erwin. That the sculptures in question date to a period approximately four decades before Erwin's work at the cathedral was evidently not recognized then or was seen as being not at all problematic. The name of Sabina von Steinbach continues to occur in studies of medieval female artists.

Another art historian, Natalie Harris Bluestone, in her Double Vision: Perspectives on Gender and the Visual Arts (Associated University Presses, 1995), further explains the misunderstanding:

The legend of Sabina stems from a misreading and mistranslation of an inscription on the portal, which identifies one 'Sabina' as the donor who made it possible for the sculptures to be cut from 'petra dura' or hard (read 'expensive') stone. 'Steinbach' is not a literal translation of 'petra dura' and probably stems from some desire to elaborate the romantic legend that has grown up around the name of the (documented) Erwin. In fact, the style of the pseudo-Sabian figures, Ecclesia and Synagogue, indicates a manufacture of ca. 1225, some fifty years before the recorded activity of Erwin and long before his death, which, in the legend provides the occasion for Sabina's intervention.

But she adds:

The truth that inheres in this legend, however, consists in its example of a Western medieval tradition: the woman artist who learns her craft from an artist-father (or some other male relative, such as husband, brother or uncle). In these circumstances, the woman of the artisan class would have had access to such training. Should the male artist die, on occasion the daughter/wife/sister/niece would inherit and run his workshop. Guild records for the late Middle Ages repeatedly describe wives as business partners and specifically allow for them to inherit and take over their deceased husband's craft or trade.
