= Georges Martin (freemason) =

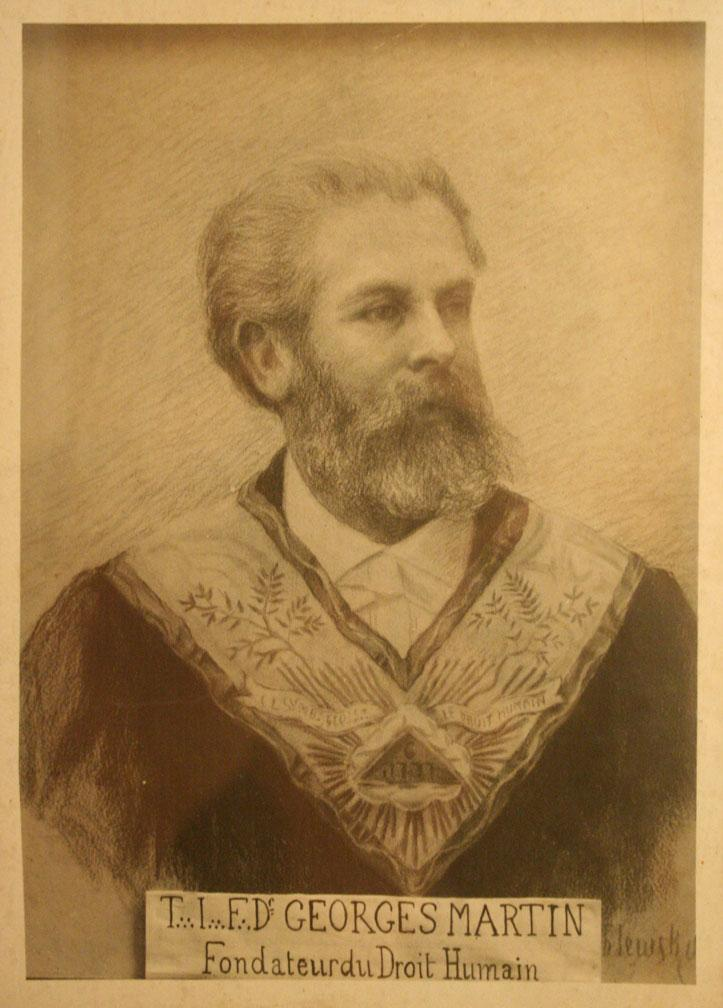

Georges Martin (9 May 1844, Paris – 1 October 1916, Paris) was a French doctor, politician and Freemason.

== Masonic Membership ==
He was initiated on 21 March 1879 into the Union et Bienfaisance lodge of the Grande Loge de France. He was one of the founders of France's "Symbolic Scottish Grand Lodge". From 1890, he worked unsuccessfully for women's initiation within the male jurisdictions.

== Founding of Co-Masonry ==
He assisted in the initiation of Maria Deraismes on 14 January 1882 into Les Libres Penseurs lodge in Pecq, and together, they founded the first mixed-sex lodge in 1893, the Grande Loge Symbolique Écossaise "Le Droit Humain". This mother-lodge became the basis for the creation of Le Droit Humain lodge, the origins of Co-Masonry; he devoted himself to the national and international development of this from 1883 to 1916. In 1901, he created "Le Droit Humain"'s Supreme Council under the authority of which all the lodges were placed.

== See also ==
- List of Freemasons
- Le Droit Humain
