= Yellow Rose (society) =

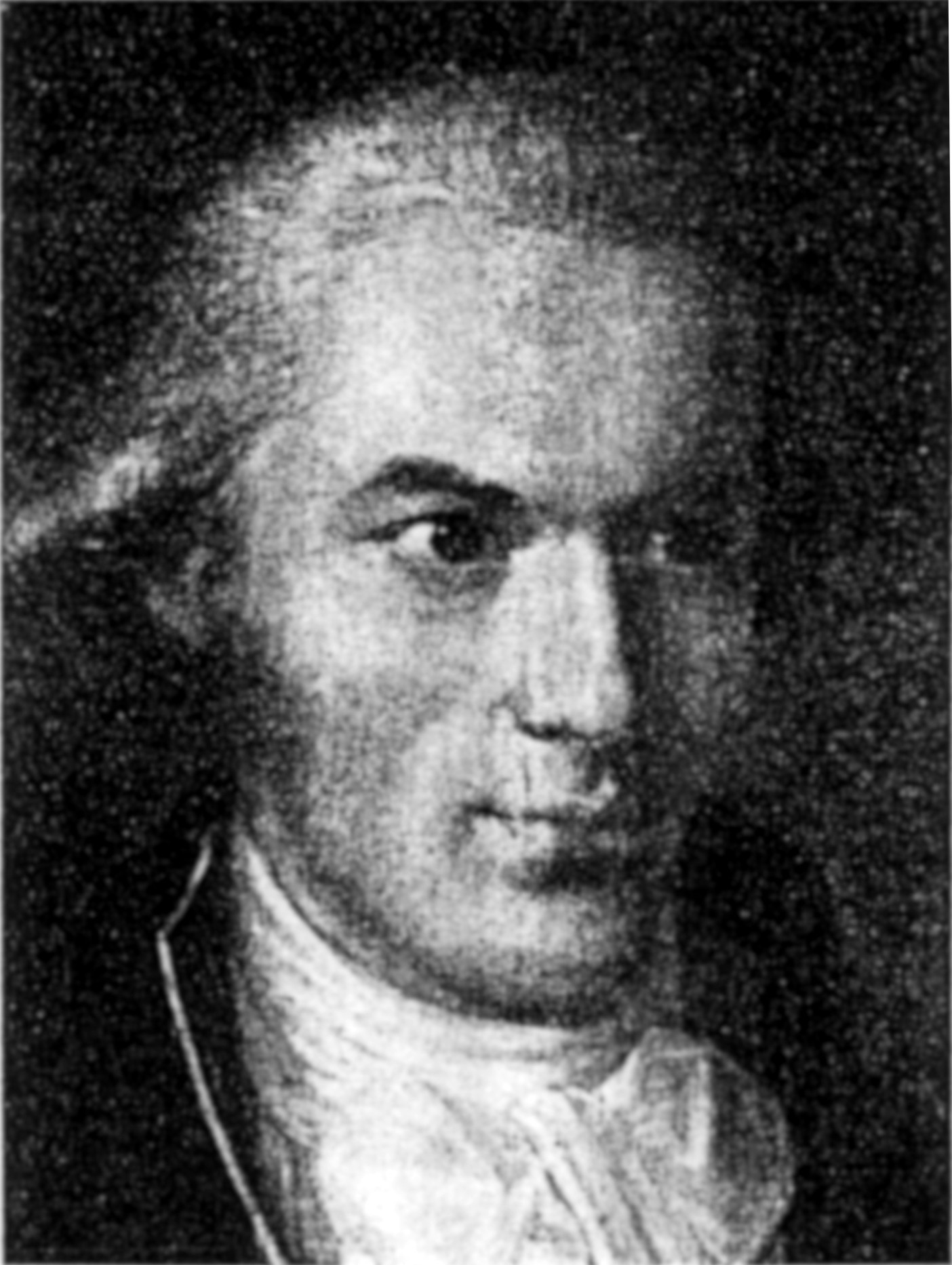
Carl Adolph Boheman 1764-1831

The Yellow Rose society (Swedish: Gula Rosen) was the name of a Swedish Masonic adoption lodge within the Freemasons, active from 1802 until 1803. It was founded by Karl Adolf Boheman upon the mutual wish of the royal couple Duke Charles and Duchess Charlotte of Södermanland, and open to both sexes. It was closed by King Gustav IV Adolf of Sweden and the cause of the so-called Boheman Affair, which caused a conflict between the monarch and his uncle and aunt.

== See also ==
- Le véritable et constante amitié
