= Rite of Adoption =

Rite of Freemasonry

The Rite of Adoption was a Masonic rite which appeared in France in the 18th century. Lodges of adoption were usually attached to regular craft lodges, but admitted the female relatives of Freemasons to a mixed lodge with its own ritual. The number of degrees varied over its history, but the first three bore the same names as the craft degrees, although the pass-words and themes of the ritual were quite different.

After flourishing during the second half of the eighteenth century, spreading to much of continental Europe, the lodges were declared unconstitutional by the Grand Orient de France early in the nineteenth, then after almost a century of eclipse, revived as female only lodges in the early twentieth. It was these lodges who later adopted the Freemasonry of their male counterparts, becoming the Grande Loge féminine de France.

The Rite of Adoption is often seen as a prototype for contemporary concordant bodies admitting the wives and daughters of Freemasons, such as the Order of the Eastern Star.

== Upper degrees ==
Different and specific systems of Upper Degree Masonry were added to the three symbolic degrees, though it is still uncertain whether the rituals for these upper degrees were used. One of these rituals was that of the Queen of Sheba, under the name of "Princess of the Crown", which was the highest of 10 degrees attested at the end of the 18th century.

== See also ==
- List of Masonic Rites

== Bibliography ==
- Daniel Ligou et al., Histoire des francs-maçons en France, Privately Published Vol 2, 2000 ISBN 2-7089-6839-4
- La Grande Loge Féminine de France Autoportrait, Collectif, Guy Trédaniel éditeur, 1995
