= Order of Women Freemasons =

International woman's organisation

The Order of Women Freemasons is an organisation based in the United Kingdom and is the larger of the two Masonic bodies for women only. Its headquarters is at 27 Pembridge Gardens in London.

== History ==
The Order was founded in 1908 as the Honourable Fraternity of Antient Masonry, and formed by a small group of men and women who seceded from the Co-Masonic movement. They disagreed with the theosophical precepts and the governance of the Co-Masonic organisation and wanted to return to the traditional workings of English Masonry. The leader and first Grand Master was W. F. Cobb, Rector of St Ethelburga’s church in the City of London. By the time he resigned from the Order in 1912, six Lodges had been consecrated. The second and all subsequent Grand Masters have been women.

The sanctions of United Grand Lodge of England (UGLE) against any of their members who associated with “irregular bodies” of Freemasons, including those admitting women, meant that there were few male candidates after 1910. In 1920 a petition was sent from the Order to UGLE for recognition as a bona fide Masonic body but this was refused. After that, men were no longer accepted as candidates into the order although there were still a few who, distancing themselves from their own obedience, chose to remain in high office. In 1935 Peter Slingsby, the male grand secretary, died and the remaining male Grand Lodge officer, Deputy Grand Master Peter Birchall, was asked to resign. From this date the order has been exclusively female. Relations with UGLE are now cordial.

In 1913 a small group who wished to introduce the Holy Royal Arch degree in an unorthodox manner were expelled from the order and founded their own female order, the Honourable Fraternity of Ancient Freemasonry.

The degree of the Holy Royal Arch was introduced in 1929 and the Mark Degree in 1946. Other higher and further degrees including the chivalric degrees were introduced in the late 1940s and the 1950s. All these are administered by the same Grand Lodge as the craft degrees.

The Honourable Fraternity of Antient Masonry took as its subtitle in 1958 ‘The Order of Women Freemasons’, to make its single-sex nature more obvious, and it is by this name that it is known today.

The order currently comprises 358 working craft lodges, based in the British Isles, Australia, Canada, South Africa, Spain and Zimbabwe. There are over 10,000 members, at last count. The workings and constitution of the order parallel those of the United Grand Lodge of England.

== Buildings ==
The order has its headquarters at 27 Pembridge Gardens in Notting Hill Gate. The large Grade II listed building (constructed during the mid 19th century in the stuccoed Greek Revival style typical of west London) was donated to the order by a member in 1924. The property is home to the Grand Temple of the Order and a second, smaller temple.

The order also operates two residential homes for members, Porchway House in Worthing and Northolme in Lytham St Annes.

== Grand masters ==
The current grand master is Jean Michele Knight.

Grand Masters of the Order:

- William Frederick Cobb (1908–1912)
- Marion Lindsay Halsey (1912–1927)
- Adelaide Daisy Litten (1928–1938)
- Lucy Bertram O’Hea (1938–1948)
- Mary Gordon Muirhead Hope (1948–1964)
- Mildred Rhoda Low (1964–1976)
- Frances Hall (1976–1989)
- Brenda Irene Fleming-Taylor (1989–2010)
- Zuzanka Daniella Penn (2010–2025)
- Jean Michele Knight (2025–present)

== See also ==
- Order of the Eastern Star
