= History of Freemasonry in Belgium =

The history of Freemasonry in Belgium reflects the many influences on what is now Belgium from the neighbouring states.

== 18th century ==
In the 18th century, Belgium was made up of 2 states – the Austrian Netherlands and the Prince-Bishopric of Liège.

=== Austrian Netherlands ===
Freemasonry in the Austrian Netherlands was very varied in its origins and expressions. The source of this fragmentation was to be found particularly in the complexity of its institutions, the influence of the government or surrounding powers, and its very deeply rooted local sense of identity.

The first Belgian lodge was founded in 1721 in Mons, under the name "La Parfaite Union" ("The Perfect Union"). It has frequently changed its name and allegiance since then, but still exists today as number 1 of the Grand Orient of Belgium. Other, more short-lived lodges seem to have been created in Ghent and Tournai in 1730. The first evidence of masonic activity in the provinces dates to 1743, in Brussels. This would be the "La Discrète Impériale" ("The Discrete Imperial") lodge of Aalst which would have number one on the tablet of the order of the Provincial Grand Lodge (Grande loge provinciale) of the Austrian Netherlands, the mother-lodge of London several times recognising it as the oldest in the region. It disappeared with the Provincial Grand Lodge of the Austrian Netherlands.

Thanks to the War of the Austrian Succession, from 1746 several lodges formed under the influence of French forces occupying the country and of the Grand Lodge of France (of which a French prince de sang, Louis de Bourbon Condé, Comte de Clermont, was Grand Master). These lodges received their patents from the Grand Lodge of France, the Grand Lodge of London, the Grand Lodge of Holland or the Grand Lodge of Scotland – for example, the "Parfaite Union" ("Perfect Union") Lodge at Namur, one of the "ancient" lodges, which in 1777 became the "Bonne Amitié" ("Good Friendship") lodge in Namur). After the Treaty of la Barrière in 1715, Batavian troops (also including English and Scottish troops) occupied the strongholds of the Austrian Netherlands (notably Namur, Tournai, Veurne, Ypres, Warneton) for a long and difficult period, and it was probably this that led to the creation or confirmation of more lasting lodges.

Another event, within freemasonry itself, accelerated the demand for patents from the non-French masonic authorities. Internal disputes within the Grand Lodge of France led to its suspension in 1767, a result of the Convent's secession from this Grand Lodge in Paris, having been excluded in previous years. From then on lodges in the Austrian Netherlands came to feel isolated. This was certainly the case for the "Vraie et Parfaite Harmonie" ("True and Perfect Harmony") lodge in Mons (English patent, received January 1770), probably also for the "Discrète Impériale" in Aalst (English patent, received June 1765) and perhaps for the "Parfaite Union/Bonne Amitié" in Namur (Scottish patent, received February 1770). In 1770, the Provincial Grand Lodge of the Austrian Netherlands formed, dependent on the Grand Lodge of London (the "Moderns"), made up of 26 lodges and with the Marquis de Gage as its Grand Master. It was centred on de Gage's own lodge "la Vraie et Parfaite Harmonie" in Mons, the most brilliant of the 18th century Austrian Netherlands.

It was in Brussels that Belgian Freemasonry was particularly important, with Masons frequently coming from its noble families. Also the ULB (Université Libre de Bruxelles) was also founded by several Masons, many of whom were also Catholics, following an appeal by the Lodges of Belgium. To quote the writer Liane Ranieri"Originating from Brussels' Masonic lodges, Brussels' University largely benefitted from the communal [Masonic] authorities; [there were] 25 Masons out of its 31 administrators". An imperial edict of Joseph II of January 1786 reduced the number of lodges in Brussels to 3 and banned them in all the other towns and cities. The Marquis de Gage tried to stall the edict but to no avail, and on 26 June that same year he was dismissed. Of the 3 official lodges in Brussels, only one truly continued the struggle.

It is useful to underline that the majority of 18th century lodges belonged to one man who became his lodge's president and so usually died out when he or his descendants died out. Examples of this include the "Parfaite Union" (Fonson family), "Vraie et Parfaite harmonie" (Marquis de Gage) and "Union des cœurs" ("Union of Hearts", by the chevalier de Sicard) lodges. Others, like the "Parfaite Union/Bonne Amitié" of Namur, did not have this characteristic and had presidents who succeeded each other quite regularly. This was why Joseph II's edict more surely put to sleep the majority of lodges of this era.

Nevertheless, a number of lodges continued to operate in secret. These were helped by the Brabant Revolution, whose beginnings can be seen as early as 1787 and which broke out in earnest in 1789 in the wake of the French Revolution. As a result, there arose one lodge in Tournai, two in Mons, one in Namur, one in Antwerp and one in Luxembourg.

==== 18th century lodges in Brussels ====
- One lodge, name unknown, c.1740.
- L’Union, 1742.
- L’Equité, 1743.
- L’Union Parfaite, 1754.
- Loge Saint-Charles.
- La Constance de l’Union, 1769.
- La Constance Eprouvée (20 mai 1770)
- L’Heureuse Rencontre, 1772.
- La Parfaite Amitié (ou l’Amitié), 1772.
- Les Vrais Amis de la Justice, 1775.
- Les Vrais Amis de l’Union, 1782.
- L’Union Fraternelle, 1784.
- La Constance de l’Union (or les Amis de l’Union), 1784.

===== Lodges of adoption (women) =====
- La Parfaite Harmonie, 1782.
- A l’Heureuse Rencontre (Les Vrais Amis)
- Au Chapitre de l’Union, 1777.
- Aux Vrais Amis de l’Union.
- Grande Loge de Saint-André d’Écosse, 1785.

===== Secret Lodge =====
- Au Pot d’Etain, Grand Place.

=== Prince-Bishopric of Liège ===
The lodges in the principality of Liège, not submitted to the imperial edict of 1786, continued in a more classical manner.

In the principality of Liège, the first lodge seems to have been "La Nymphe" ("The Nymph") lodge of Chaudfontaine in 1749. In 1760, the prince-bishop banned freemasonry, but his successor François-Charles de Velbrück (1772–1784) belonged to and protected the Order (during the 18th century, several Catholic priests were also Freemasons.)

In 1774 the "Union des Cœurs" lodge was founded in Liège by chevalier Pierre de Sicard, who had already founded several lodges from which he profited (according to U. Capitaine) – in the lodge's regulations, the cost of a mallet, an apron, a lodge rug and other Masonic equipment was precisely stipulated! This was not the first time that the mercantile instinct had intruded into Freemasonry, with France's Grand Lodge also struggling against it at this time. This was why, Ulysse Capitaine tells us, there was a huge transfer of "brothers" from this lodge to the "la Parfaite Intelligence" ("The Perfect Intelligence") lodge, created in 1775 by the Grand Orient de France. A schism quickly took place in this lodge, with the creation of the "la Parfaite Egalité" ("The Perfect Equality") lodge, finally recognised by the Grand Orient de France in 1776. Another lodge, the "Indivisible", in Spa, was created by the Grand Lodge of Holland in 1778 and rejoined the Grand Orient de France (according to Ulysse Capitaine) in 1787.

=== The Grand Orient de Bouillon ===
The Duchy of Bouillon, annexed from the Prince-Bishopric of Liège by French troops of Louis XIV, was a sovereign duchy set up for the Duc de Bouillon. Its dukes during the 18th century were Charles-Godefroy, then Godefroy-Charles de La Tour d'Auvergne, vicomte de Turenne. The La Tour d'Auvergne family in this era was strongly linked to the House of Stuart, deposed from the English throne (the Duke was the brother-in-law of James III of England), as well as being enthusiastic freemasons. This Grand Orient thus represented the "Jacobite" tendency within Freemasonry (named after James II of England), a Freemasonry traditionally finding its roots among the Catholic Scottish nobility and in a format based on the upper degrees of freemasonry. This Grand Orient was represented by one lodge, the "Saint-Charles de la Parfaite Harmonie", situated in Bouillon. Its presence was historically confirmed in 1763, but few documents on it survive. It was the origin for other lodges, such as "Amitié et Fraternité" in 1786 in Dunkirk. Its influence was probably more important than the surviving documents seem to show.

== 1795 to 1814 ==
The French Revolution decimated freemasonry in France itself – from around 700 lodges and 30,000 masons during the ancien regime, only around 30 lodges and a few thousand masons remained. – but led to a new start for Belgian freemasonry. This was due to the new French republic's annexation of the Austrian Netherlands in 1794, and its merger into France from 1795 to 1814. From 1798, thanks to French military lodges, the "Les Amis Philanthropes" lodge was created in Brussels, giving second wind to Belgian freemasonry and forming the basis for the most important Belgian Masonic works of the following century. The military lodges also caused a massive expansion in the number of new lodges (see the list below).

The French period was characterised by an important expansion in Freemasonry in what would become Belgium. These lodges were perhaps revolutionary, anticlerical and Francophile. They were above all, at least in appearances, strongly submitted to French imperial power – Napoleon, as emperor, favoured Freemasonry only because he controlled it. It was at this time largely Deist, if not Catholic, even if anti-clericalism was never really absent, and experience little tension with the Roman Catholic Church. This period came to an end with Napoleon's final defeat at the battle of Waterloo on 18 June 1815, by which time Belgium had 27 lodges.

== 1815–1830 ==
The treaty of Paris and the Congress of Vienna at the end of the Napoleonic Wars annexed Belgium to the kingdom of the Netherlands, with Belgian Freemasonry coming under Dutch instead of French influence. Some of its lodges disappeared with the end of French control, some of which were revived later. The Grand Lodge of the Netherlands (Grand Loge des Pays-Bas) formed at this time, with two administrative Grand Lodges (one for the north, known as Holland, and the other for the south, known as Belgium); the southern one included the "Bonne amitié" lodge of Namur, which was number one on the southern administrative Grand Lodge's tablet. Prince Frédéric d'Orange-Nassau became the overall lodge's Serenest Grand Master and Prince Charles-Alexandre de Gavre, a member of the "Bonne Amitié" lodge of Namur since the mid-1770s, became the southern lodge's official representative. Nevertheless, few records survive on the relations between the two administrative lodges and between the Serenest Grand Master and the various lodges, especially those in Belgium. These relations are illustrated by an episode in 1821 when the Belgian lodges suppressed the upper grades to replace them with a system of two contemporary grades to three top grades ("Élu" and "Maître Élu").

In effect, the Ancient and Accepted Scottish Rite was formalised in 33 grades in 1801 in Charlestown, to return to France in 1804. This Rite also proved highly successful across Europe and the Americas. It was in 1817 that a supreme council of this rite would be created in Belgium, on the initiative of the "Les Amis Philantropes" lodge. In 1818 the Primitive Scottish Rite, also known as the Namur Rite, was officially constituted, with the Prince de Gavre as its Grand Master – its origins date back to the 1780s but it only ever had 4 lodges in Belgium and held its last ceremony there in 1866.

It was not only the upper grades that were practised during this era – some lodges practiced the philosophical Scottish rite, others the rectified rite, the Misraïm rite, the system of Hérédom de Kilwinning, or even the system of two upper grades put in place by prince Frédéric d'Orange-Nassau, among others the "le Septentrion" lodge in Ghent. Thus the diversity of practises in the late 18th century was carried over into the first half of the 19th century

== The Grand Orient of Belgium ==
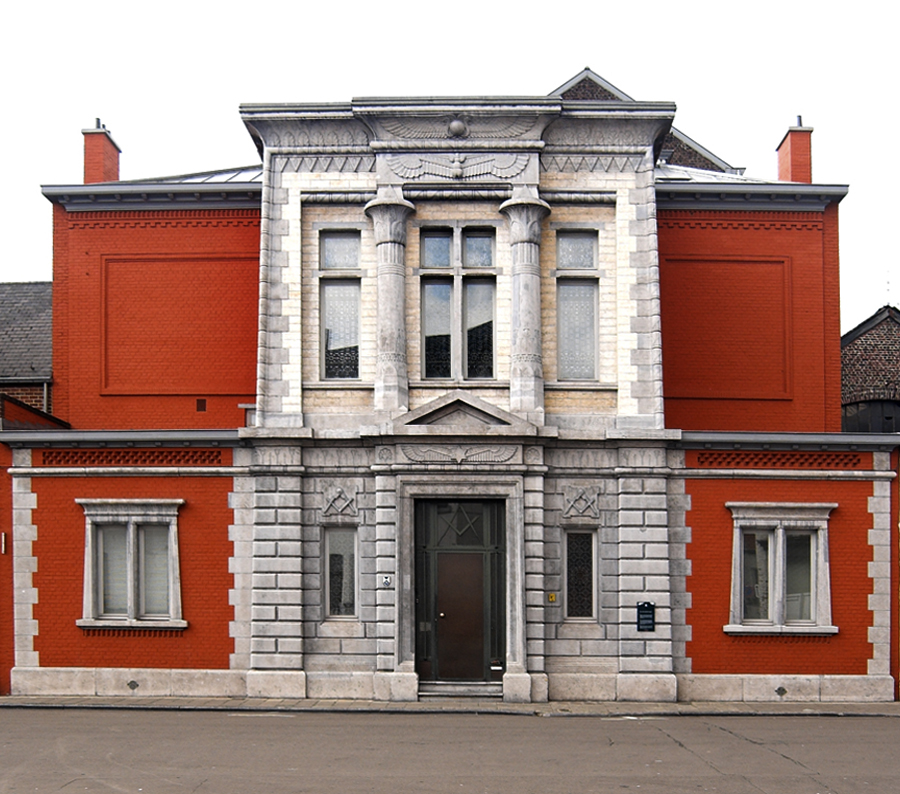
The "La Parfaite Union" lodge in Mons, built to plans by the architect Hector Puchot in 1890

The period of Dutch influence came to an end with the Belgian Revolution of 1830.

=== Beginnings ===
The birth of the kingdom of Belgium led in 1833 to the creation of the Grand Orient of Belgium, supported by Leopold I of Belgium, who had himself been initiated in the "Loge l'Espérance" at Bern in 1813. It was proposed that he become its Serenest Grand Master, but he declined the offer and instead gave that post to baron Goswin de Stassart, one of his closest collaborators. Stassert had been initiated in Paris around 1803 and was affiliated to the "Bonne Amitié" lodge of Namur on 1 May 1820, then to the "Les Amis Philanthropes" lodge on 24 June 1835. Stassart took as his special representative Théodore Verhaegen. "La Bonne Amitié" took number one on the tablet of the Grand Orient of Belgium until 1898, when it ceded that position to the "Parfaite Union" lodge of Mons. Some lodges remained faithful to the Grand-Orient des Pays-Bas -, the "Septentrion" in Ghent did so until 1883 and only joined the Grand Orient of Belgium late on.

The lodges in Liège, Huy and Verviers created the "Fédération maçonnique belge" before joining the Grand Orient of Belgium in 1854. The creation of a new Grand Lodge for the new country of Belgium had rapidly caused these lodges problems over article 135 in the Masonic statutes, which forbade political and religious discussions in lodges, and they made unsuccessful attempts to have its suppressed. They then remained separate from the new Grand Lodge until the abrogation of this article in 1854.

In this era lodges were filled with military officers, so much so that F. Clément protested "..., we demand if there are still any officers in the army who have not yet been initiated"!

In the wake of the encyclical Mirari Vos of 1832 and the resultant episcopal letter from cardinal Englebert Sterckx and the episcopate in 1837 banning Catholics from being or becoming Freemasons, Belgian freemasonry became less Catholic in character, though it remained deist. However, it seems that the Belgian episcopate favoured the election of Stassart as Grand Master, having initially decided that the struggle against "Orangism" (i.e. Protestantism) was the priority and that a freemasonry detached from Protestantism would be nominally neutral but in fact favour Catholicism.

The struggle between the pro- and anti-clerical movements reached a crescendo. It had a bearing on public education, up to the point that in 1834 the "Les Amis Philanthropes" lodge founded the Université libre et laïque de Bruxelles, on the suggestion of Théodore Verhaegen in his discourse of 24 June 1834 to that lodge. The project then expanded massively, with several Catholic freemasons choosing freemasonry over the Catholic Church. Little by little Freemasonry came to recruit its members from the anti-clerical milieux, but the struggle was rough, as seen most of all in the changes in the Grand Lodge. For example, the old "Bonne Amitié" lodge at Namur came to be held at arm's length by its "ancients", members of the Primitive Scottish Rite, and so did not disappear despite the importance of the disaffiliations and dissensions caused by the encyclical. Other lodges, however, did not have the same opportunity.

The Baron de Stassart retired as Grand Master of the Grand Orient (until then a post held for life) on 16 June 1841, following his departure as governor of the Province of Brabant for not having favoured the election of a "Grand Maréchal du Palais" (he made a decision of the clerical type of the "Unionist" government) and facing the rise to power of socio-political movements within the lodge. 6,000 people gathered in the Parc de Bruxelles to show their solidarity with him, a considerable number for this era.

== 20th century ==
The main defining feature of 20th century freemasonry was the creation of several female lodges, of mixed obediences. The second half of the century was also characterised by the structuralisation of international freemasonry into two blocks.

=== To 1914 ===
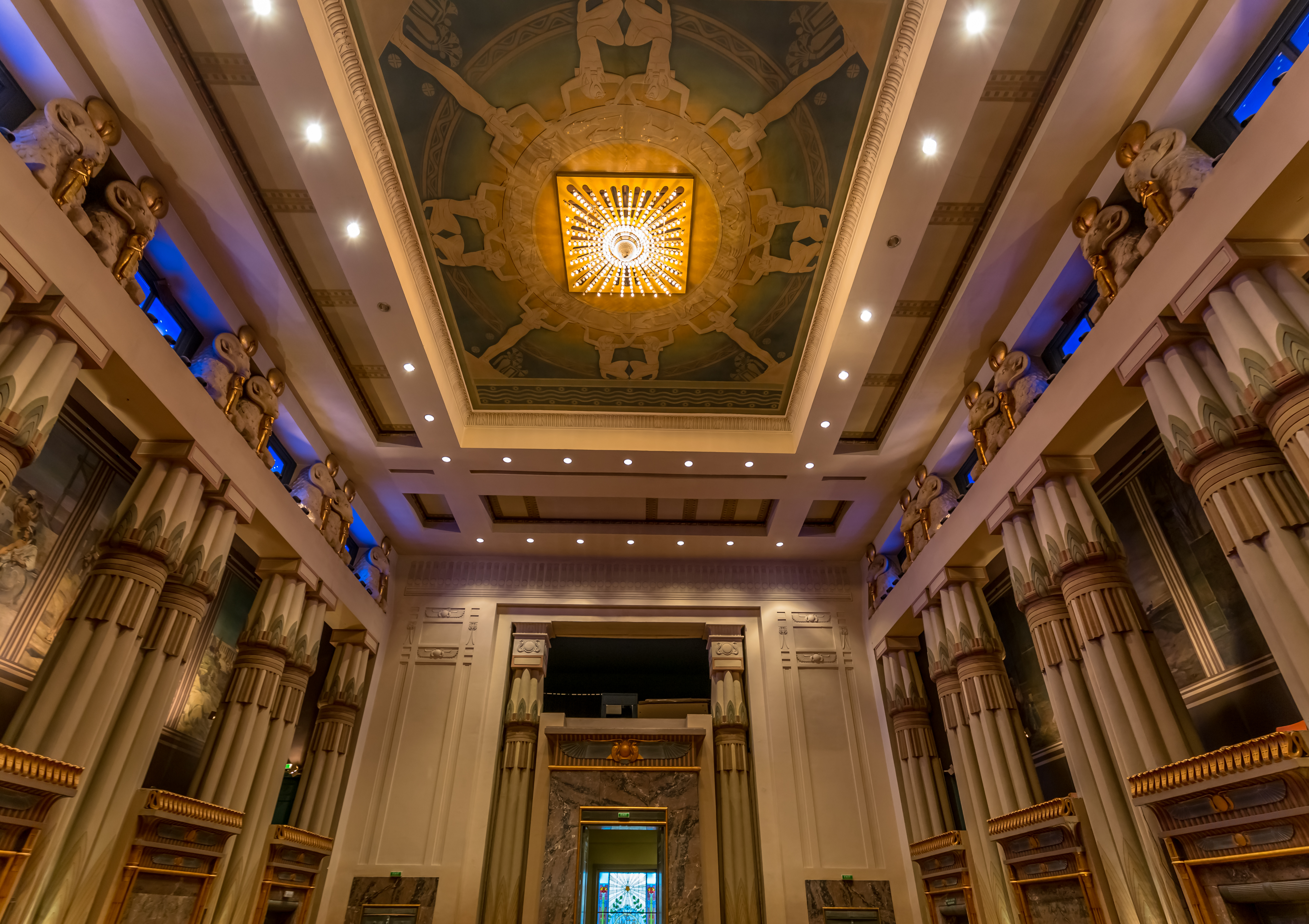
View of the Egyptianate-style main hall of the Grand Orient of Belgium in Brussels

In 1900, Goblet d'Alviella became president of the Supreme Council (Upper Degrees of the Ancient and Accepted Scottish Rite), after having been president of the Grand Orient of Belgium. He had an important international impact, organising the international conference of Supreme Councils in Brussels in 1907, at which 21/25 Supreme Councils were represented, including those from the United States of America but with the notable exceptions of the 3 "Supreme Councils" of Great Britain. This conference was repeated in Washington in 1912 and in Lausanne in 1922. In 1913, the Supreme Council of Belgium delivered the patents of constitutions from the Supreme Council of the Netherlands. It was at this moment that Freemasonry first took on a new international unity.

Without denying its past, at the start of the 20th century Belgian Freemasonry and its practices were now more classical in appearance, in an appeased spirit and very different to its appearance a hundred years before – obedience to the symbolic degrees (the first three degrees), to the Upper Degrees, often directed by the same man – in short, a Freemasonry that was expanding. Nevertheless, from this communal base, Belgian Freemasonry little by little became more diverse. A large part of Belgian Freemasonry as it stands today derives from this Grand Orient – Suprême Conseil unity at the start of the 20th century. The lay Flemish struggle, emanating from the Antwerp and Ghent lodges, at this point concentrated on the Flemishisation of the University of Ghent.

=== Women ===
The main development in early 20th century Belgian Freemasonry, however, was the birth of mixed female-male Freemasonry and women's assertion of their equal right with men to become masons. The first female Belgian Freemason was Isabelle Gatti de Gamond, initiated in the "Diderot" lodge of the Grand Symbolic Scottish Rite Lodge (French in origin) around 1903. She was later invited to a Masonic meeting at the "Amis philanthropes" lodge, but she fell sick (dying in 1905) and this meeting did not occur. In 1905 the first lodge of Le Droit Humain was created in Amsterdam, the Cazotte lodge (number 13), inaugurated by Georges Martin: a delegation from the "Amis du Commerce et de la Persévérance Réunis" and "Amis Philanthropes" lodges was sent to it and these two lodges decided to affiliate to it, with the idea of creating a lodge of this jurisdiction in Belgium. Concerning the presence of women in a lodge, the Grand Orient of Belgium pronounced the recreation of lodges of adoption in the image of those of 18th century French lodges of that type! These lodges of adoption formed the basis for the creation of the Grande Loge féminine de France after the Second World War.

On 21 November 1910, the "les Amis Philanthropes" lodge, under the presidency of Henri Lafontaine, welcomed the founder of Le Droit Humain along with Maria Deraismes, Georges Martin and other male and female Freemasons to a conference. The Grand Orient quietly condemned the move, and the "Les Amis Philanthropes" lodge split, speeding up the formation of the first Le Droit Humain lodge in Belgium out of the pro-female masons who had split from "Les Amis Philanthropes". This was to be the "Égalité" ("Equality") lodge, number 45, which was officially inaugurated in 1912. Unfortunately the death of Isabelle Gatti de Gamond meant the new lodge had no high-profile woman to recruit for it and so was mainly made up of men. Only in the inter-war period did women take up leadership responsibilities in this jurisdiction in Belgium, which became autonomous in 1928 with (at first) 6 lodges. This autonomy came with the 1928 formation of the Fédération belge du Droit Humain as a mixed-sex Grand Lodge, and saw a continuing expansion (while the Grand Orient of Belgium seeing its numbers neither rise nor fall during the inter-war period and remaining hostile to the Droit Humain until after the Second World War). The Grande Loge féminine de France was created in 1952, with a solely female membership. This jurisdiction later created lodges in other countries, with Belgium' first forming in 1974. The Women's Grand Lodge of Belgium formed in 1981.

=== 1914–1945 ===
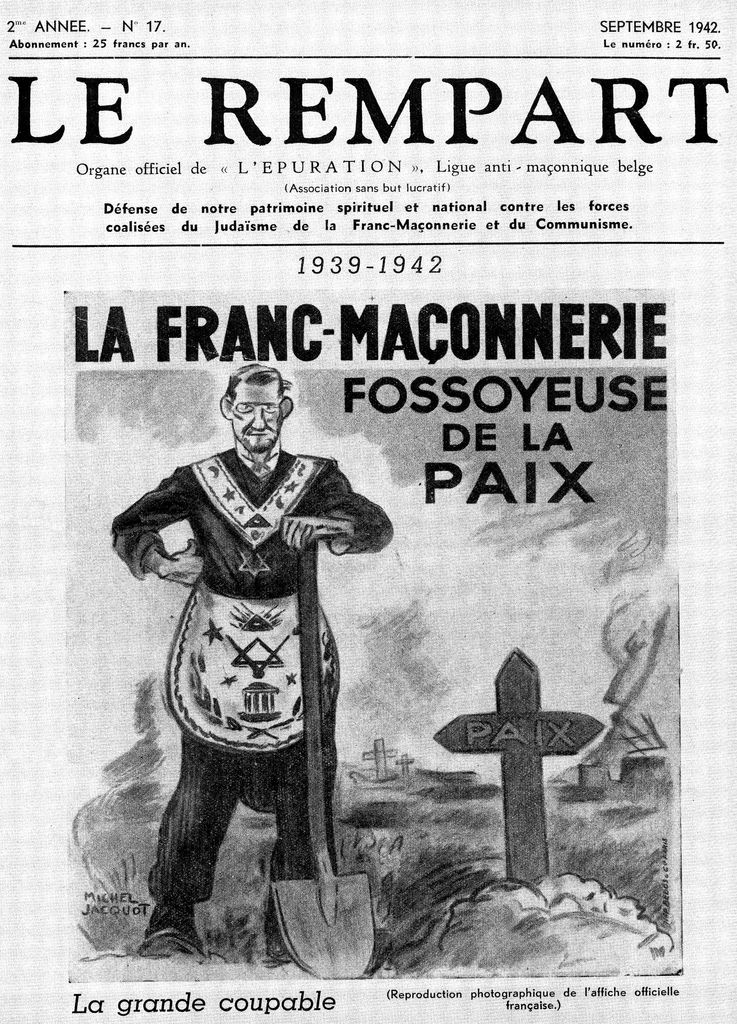
A 1942 issue of the periodical Le Rempart of the Ligue antimaçonnique belge accusing Freemasons of "burying" peace

During the First World War Belgium was almost wholly occupied by Germany and the lodges suspended their operations. The period was marked by the "Call to the Grand Lodges of Germany" organised by Charles Magnette, Grand Master of the Grand Orient of Belgium, on 27 September 1914, aiming to have the occupying troops exactions on the Belgians examined by an independent commission. This received two polite responses from seven close jurisdictions. Magnette relapsed on 7 November 1915 to prevent the massive deportation of Belgian workers to Germany and was arrested and imprisoned by the occupying authorities for subversion for the duration. The lodges resumed their work when peace came, but found new enemies in the dictators of the right and left (with the former finding Masonry's emphasis on free thought dangerous, and the latter reproaching it for "class collaboration").

In 1921 the "Association Maçonnique Internationale" (A.M.I.) was created on the initiative of the Swiss Grand Lodge Alpina and with the active participation of Charles Magnette. Like the vast majority of international Freemasonry (with the notable exception of the Grand United Lodge of England), the Grand Orient of Belgium adhered to this organisation, though the Grand Lodges of New York and the Netherlands soon left it.

On the German invasion on 10 May 1940, Freemasonry was banned. With the aid of a list of Freemasons published in a conservative Catholic newspaper, the occupiers arrested, deported and assassinated several Masons, such as Georges Pêtre, president of the supreme council in 1942, and Jules Hiernaux, Grand Master of the Grand Orient of Belgium in 1944. Belgian Masonic life continued in exile in London and New York, and even secretly in the concentration camp at Esterwegen (the "Liberté chérie" lodge) and the PoW camp at Prenslau (the "L'Obstinée" lodge).

=== Post-war ===
On Belgium's liberation, Masonry resumed but its numbers had fallen by a quarter. In 1950, the "Association Maçonnique Internationale" was dissolved by the Grande Loge suisse Alpina which had created it. On 15 May 1954 the Convention of Luxembourg was signed, combining the United Grand Lodges of Germany, the Grand Orient of the Netherlands, the Grande loge suisse Alpina, etc. This convention enumerated the six proofs of regularity to which jurisdictions had to subscribe to be mutually recognised. The United Grand Lodge of England later joined this movement, becoming the regulator of Masonic regularity. The schism between "regular" and "liberal" Freemasonry became official at this date, even if in 1958 the Grand Orient of the Netherlands unsuccessfully tried to reconcile the Grands Orient de France and Grand Orient of Belgium to the international movement which it was creating. In 1959 5 lodges aspiring to greater "regularity" formed the "Grand Lodge of Belgium", dragging in their wake Belgium's Supreme Council, which broke off relations with the Grand Orient of Belgium in 1960. The Grand Lodge of Belgium was recognised by the United Grand Lodge of England in 1965. On 22 January 1961, in reaction, the CLIPSAS was created to gather together the "liberal" jurisdictions (most important among them the Grand Orient of Belgium, the Grand Orient de France and the Droit Humain). This grouping ran into difficulties in 1995, leading to the creation of "AMIL".

In 1979, a schism occurred in the Grand Lodge of Belgium with the creation of the Regular Grand Lodge of Belgium, dragging along a so-called "Grand et Suprême Conseil de Belgique" via a schism in the Supreme Council of Belgium. This new Grand Lodge finally became the only one in Belgium to be recognised by the United Grand Lodge of England. This led to a rapprochement between the Grand Lodge of Belgium and the Grand Orient of Belgium, with accords of mutual recognition and cooperation officialised in 1989.

New Upper Degrees jurisdictions were also created: the "Grand Collège du Rite Écossais pour la Belgique" (originally recruiting only from the Grand Orient of Belgium), the remains of the "Supreme Council of Belgium" (originally recruiting only from the Gand Lodge) and the "Supreme Council for Belgium" (originally recruiting from both). Later both these all-male "Supreme Councils" were merged. Even Belgium's male-female Droit Humain and the Grande Loge Féminine have their own systems of Upper Degrees.

Other jurisdictions and rites were also present in Belgian, but in a quite secretive manner. Among them, the most important rite was the Rite of Memphis-Misraim, long present in Belgium and now co-operating with most of the "liberal" Belgian masonic associations.

At the end of the 20th century, Belgian freemasonry thus had a very diversified appearance and a great wealth of practices, with a number of female and male freemasons that it has not reached since its origins.

== Bibliography ==
- R Desmed. La Franc-Maçonnerie, dans HASQUIN H. (réd.), La Belgique sous le Régime français, Bruxelles, Crédit communal, 1993
- J. Pragman (ed.). Visages de la Franc-Maçonnerie à Tournai – Deux siècles d'histoire(s) maçonnique(s) tournaisienne(s) – De 1765 à 1865, de 1906 à nos jours, Mémogrames, Bruxelles, 2006.
- H de Schampheleire. In: Un siècle de Franc-maçonnerie dans nos régions 1740–1840; CGER, 1983.
- G. de Froidcourt. François Charles, Comte de Velbruck. Prince-évêque de Liège, Franc-maçon. Protin et Vuidar; Liège, 1936.
- G. de Froidcourt. La Franc-maçonnerie à Namur avant 1830. In Fédération archéologique et historique de Belgique. 31e session : Congrès de Namur, 1938.
- B. Vander Schelden. La Franc-maçonnerie belge sous le régime autrichien (1721–1794). 1ère Édition 1923. Ed Labor 2006.
- P. Duchaine. La franc-maçonnerie belge au XVIIIe siècle. 1ère Édition 1911. Réédition Collection tradition et Documents maçonnique.Memo Codec, 1987.
- P. Chevalier. Histoire de la franc-maçonnerie française. 1725–1799. Éd. Fayard, 1974.
- U. Capitaine. Aperçu historique sur la Franc-maçonnerie à Liège avant 1830. Typographie Carmanne, 1853.
- F. Clément. Contribution à l'histoire de la R. L. La Bonne Amitié à l'Orient de Namur. In Bulletin du Grand Orient de Belgique,1924.
- Hugo de Schampheleire, Els Witte, Fernand V Borné. Essai bibliographique relatif à l'histoire de la Franc-maçonnerie belge, 1798–1855. Aureliae scientifica. Leuven, 1973.
- André de Kervella. Francs-maçons au Duché de Bouillon. Éd. Weyrich, 2006.
- F Clément (bis). Histoire de la Franc-maçonnerie belge au XIXe siècle. Ed. Suprême Conseil, Bruxelles, 1940.
- Els Witte. La franc-maçonnerie belge face au mouvement flamand du XIXe siècle. In Visages de la Franc-maçonnerie du XVIIIe au XXe siècle. (Direction scientifique H Hasquin). Ed. de l'Université de Bruxelles, 1983.
- M Bruwier, ML Pirotte. Le rôle de la loge les "Amis Philanthropes" dans la création du "Droit Humain" en Belgique (1910–1912). In Visages de la Franc-maçonnerie du XVIIIe au XXe siècle. (Direction scientifique H Hasquin). Ed. de l'Université de Bruxelles, 1983.
- Grand Orient de Belgique. Charles Magnette. Grand Maître national de la Maçonnerie belge. Pendant l'occupation allemande 1914–1918. Edition du GOB, 1920.
- F. Clement (ter). Contribution à l'Étude des Hauts Grades de la Franc-Maçonnerie et particulièrement à l'Histoire du Rite Écossais Ancien et Accepté en Belgique. Éd. Suprême Conseil Belgique, 1937.
- MR. Thielemans. Goswin, baron de Stassart (1780–1854). Politique et franc-maçonnerie. Éd. Académie Royale de Belgique, 2008.
