= International Masonic Association =

- Established: 23 October 1921 (dissolved 1950)
- Location(s): International: Grand Lodge Alpina of Switzerland Grand Orient de France Grand Lodge of New York Grand Lodge of France Grand Orient of Belgium Grand Orient of Italy Grand Orient of the Netherlands; 20, rue Général-Dufour, Grande-Chancellerie, Geneva, Switzerland

The International Masonic Association (French: Association maçonnique internationale, also known as the AMI) founded in 1921 and dissolved in 1950, was an international grouping of Masonic obediences. Based in Geneva, the home of the Grand Lodge Alpina of Switzerland, the international was directed along the lines of Continental Freemasonry and heavily influenced by the Grand Orient de France. The organisation was involved in political activities in Europe between the First World War and the Second World War.

== History ==
=== Background ===
In 1889, the Grand Orient de France proposed to create an international Masonic federation. This was done in 1902 at the International Masonic Congress in Geneva. The following year, an international office of Masonic relations was opened in Neuchâtel in Switzerland and placed under the direction of Édouard Quartier-la-Tente who was then Grand Master of the Grand Lodge Alpina of Switzerland (GLSA). Caught in the turmoil of the First World War, the office had to cease its activities, it was dissolved in 1920.

=== Foundation and growth ===
In October 1921, during the Geneva Convention under the presidency of Isaac Reverchon, Grand Master of the GLSA, the obediences of the liberal Continental Freemasonry current came together to found a new organization: the International Masonic Association. Its aim is to maintain the existing relations between the Grand Lodges, to develop them and to create new ones. Among the founders are the GLSA, the Grand Orient de France, the Grand Lodge of New York, the Grand Lodge of France, the Grand Orient of Belgium, the Grand Orient of Italy and the Grand Orient of the Netherlands. With the exception of the Grand Lodge of New York, most of the obediences were located in the European sphere of influence and were part of the radical political current. According to the historian Yves Hivert-Messeca in 1923 the association had 23 obediences including 14 European, in 1924 seven new memberships were registered including five coming from Latin America and two new ones from Europe bringing its membership to thirty. Between 1927 and 1934 eleven new obediences including three large Mexican lodges swelled the numbers which reached their maximum that year.

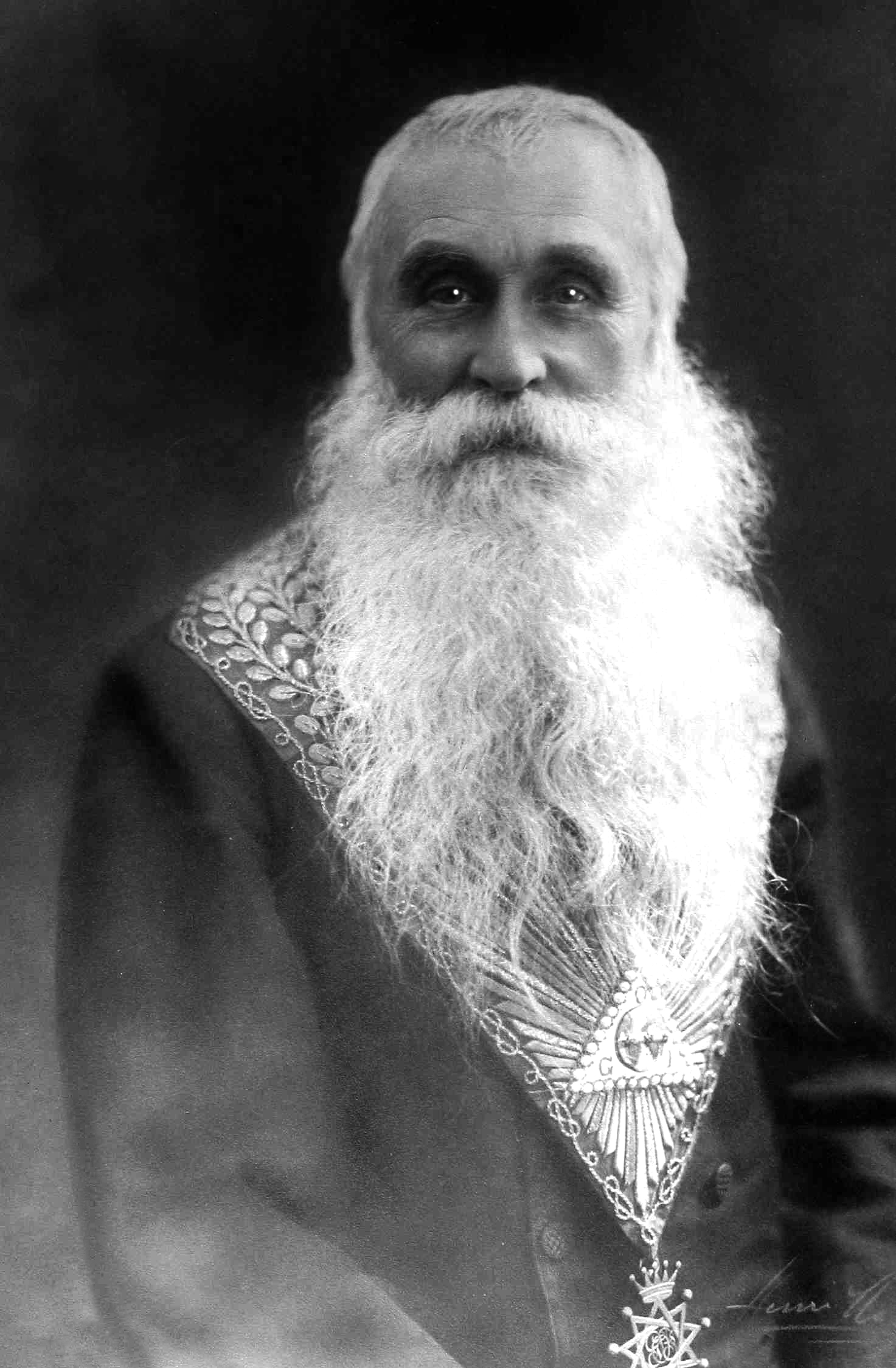
Portrait of Arthur Groussier, president of the International Masonic Association from 1927 until 1930.

=== Political activities ===
From 1927 to 1930, the AMI was chaired by the Frenchman Arthur Groussier, president of the Council of the Order (Grand Master) of the Grand Orient de France.

In the 1930s, the AMI played a leading role in coordinating the political activities of the Continental freemasons. On May 6, 1933, during the Brussels congress the International Masonic Association launched an appeal to all lodges and grand lodges in the world to protest against the rise of National Socialism in Germany and called on them to: "unite to ensure respect for the principles of human freedom and dignity which are the honor of our civilization ” .

During World War II the AMI moved its office from Geneva to Lisbon and unsuccessfully made political efforts to convince the British and American governments not to recognize the reign of Francisco Franco over the Spanish State, but to work for the reconstruction of Spain along liberal lines (either under the guise of a constitutional monarchy under Juan de Bórbon or as an outright republic). Indeed, the Spanish State under Franco constantly accused the International Masonic Association by name of being part of an international anti-patriotic plot and as having caused the Spanish Civil War.

=== Dissolution ===
After the Second World War, the United Grand Lodge of England, which acted as the figurehead of the less politically radical Regular Freemasonry, called on the GLSA to sever its relations with the Continental Freemasons dominated by the Grand Orient de France. Consequently, in 1950, the Swiss obedience split from the Continentals and dissolved the AMI.

== Grand Chancellors ==
- Édouard Quartier-la-Tente (1921-1925)
- Isaac Reverchon (1925-1927)
- John Mossaz (1927-1950)

== Members ==
=== Europe ===
- Belgium: Grand Orient de Belgique (1921-)
- Bulgaria: Grand Lodge of Bulgaria (1921-)
- Spain: Grand Lodge of Spain (1921-1937) banned by state
- Spain: Grand Orient of Spain (1930?-1937) banned by state
- France: Grande Loge de France (1921-)
- France: Grand Orient de France (1921-)
- Greece: Grand Orient of Greece (1923-)
- Netherlands: Grand Orient of the Netherlands (1921-1927)
- Italy: Grand Orient of Italy (1921-1927) banned by state
- Luxembourg: Grand Lodge of Luxembourg (1927?-)
- Norway: Grand Lodge Polarstjernen (1927-)
- Poland: Grand Lodge of Poland (1936-1937) banned by state
- Portugal: Grand Orient Lusitanien Uni de Portugal (1921-1935) banned by state
- Switzerland: Grande Loge Suisse Alpina (1921-)
- Czechoslovakia: National Grand Lodge of Czechoslovakia (1930?-1939) banned by state
- Turkey: Grand Orient of Turkey (1921-1935) banned by state
- Austria: Grand Lodge of Vienna for Austria (1930?-1939) banned by state
- Yugoslavia: Grand Lodge of Yugoslavia (1926-)
- Germany: Freemasons' Association for the Rising Sun (1921-1934) banned by state
- Germany: Symbolic Grand Lodge of Germany (1930-1934) banned by state

=== Americas ===
- USA: Grand Lodge of New York (1921-1924)
- Puerto Rico: Sovereign Grand Lodge of Puerto Rico (1923-)
- El Salvador: Grand Lodge of Cuscatlan (1923-)
- Venezuela: Grand Lodge of the United States of Venezuela (1923-)
- Colombia: National Grand Lodge of Colombia in Barranquilla (1923-)
- Colombia: National Grand Lodge of Colombia in Cartagena (1923-)
- Ecuador: Grand Lodge of Ecuador (1924-)
- Peru: Grand Lodge of the Republic of Peru (1924-)
- Haiti: Grand Orient of Haiti (1924-)
- Guatemala: Grand Lodge of Guatemala (1924-)
- Brazil: Grand Orient of Brazil (1930-)
- Mexico: Grand Lodge "The Oriental Peninsula" of the State of Merida (1930-)
- Mexico: Grand Lodge of the Pacific in Guaymas in the State of Sonora (1930-)
- Cuba: Grand Lodge of the Isle of Cuba (1930-)
- Mexico: Grand Lodge of the Valle of Mexico (1936?-)
- Honduras: Grand Lodge of Honduras (1936?-)
- Panama: Grand Lodge of Panama (1936?-)
- Argentina: Grand Lodge of the Republic of Argentina (1936?-)
- Bolivia: Grand Lodge of Bolivia (1936?-)
- Chile: Grand Lodge of Chile (1936?-)
- Paraguay: Symbolic Grand Lodge of Paraguay (1936?-)
- Uruguay: Grand Orient of Uruguay (1936?-)

=== Asia ===
- Philippines: Gran Logia Soberana del Archipielago Filipino (1923-1950)

== Congresses ==
- 1921 Geneva, Switzerland
- 1923 Geneva, Switzerland
- 1924 Brussels, Belgium
- 1925 Geneva, Switzerland
- 1927 Paris, France
- 1930 Brussels, Belgium
- 1932 Istanbul, Turkey
- 1934 Luxembourg
- 1936 Prague, Czechoslovakia

== See also ==
- Centre de Liaison et d'Information des Puissances maçonniques Signataires de l'Appel de Strasbourg
- International Secretariat of the Masonic Adogmatic Powers
- Political international
