= Magnette =

Magnette is a surname. Notable people with the surname include:

- Charles Magnette (1863–1937), Belgian lawyer and politician
- Félix Magnette (1868–1942), Belgian historian
- Paul Magnette (born 1971), Belgian politician

== See also ==
- Maggette
