= International Masonic Union Catena =

The International Masonic Union Catena is an international organization of Masonic organizations.

== History ==
The organization was created in 1961 by the Nederlandse grootloge der gemengde vrijmetsalerij, Humanitas – Freimaurergroßloge für Frauen und Männer in Deutschland and Österreichischer Universaler Freimaurerorden - Humanitas. It is only for mixed masonic organizations.

The Catena is open only to lodges that acknowledge a Supreme Being (Great Architect of the Universe).

== Members ==
=== Present members ===
- International Masonic Order DELPHI (Greece)
- Humanitas – Freimaurergroßloge für Frauen und Männer in Deutschland (Germany)
- Österreichischer Universaler Freimaurerorden - Humanitas (Austria)
- Order of the Ancient Free Masonry for Men and Women (United Kingdom)
- Grand Loge "Humanitas Bohemia" (Czech Republic)
- Groupement Maçonnique de Loges Mixtes et Indépendantes (France)
- Maçons Lliures Mare Nostrum (Spain)
- Ordine Massonico Tradizionale Italiano (Italy)
- Grand Lodge of Freemasonry for Men & Women of Greece.
- Grand Lodge of Modern Mixed Mason (United Kingdom)

=== Former members ===
- Nederlandse grootloge der gemengde vrijmetsalerij
- Jus Humanum Suecia (Sweden)
- Grande Loja Arquitetos de Aquario (Brasil)
- Gran Loggia d' Italia degli ALAM (Italy)

== See also ==
- CLIPSAS
- Grand Orient of Belgium
- Grande Loge Nationale Française
- International Secretariat of the Masonic Adogmatic Powers

== Sources ==
- International Masonic Union Catena
- Henderson, Kent & Pope, Tony: Freemasonry Universal, 2 vols, Global Masonic Publications, Melbourne 1998, 2000, vol 2 p 6.
