= Grand Lodge Alpina of Switzerland =

Swiss Masonic obedience

- Established: 1844
- Location: Switzerland
- Website: freimaurerei.ch

With 84 lodges and 3’350 members, the Grand Lodge Alpina of Switzerland (GLAS) is a Swiss Masonic obedience founded in 1844.

It is the oldest and most numerous Grand Lodge in Switzerland, but other so-called liberal Grand Lodges exist on Swiss territory, including the Droit Humain Suisse, the Mixed Grand Loge of Switzerland, the Grand Lodge Symbolique Helvétique, the Grand Orient of Switzerland and the Women's Grand Lodge of Switzerland. According to its historic custom, the GLAS is monogenous, and its lodges admit only male members.

The essence of the GLAS is that its Constitution is based on ‘the spirit of the Old Charges, from which the Anderson Constitutions of 1723 were inspired. These include a belief in a Supreme Being, the presence of a sacred book on the lodge altar; no brother may promote his personal opinions on religion or politics.

Through its adherence to these values, GLAS has recognized a wide network of Grand Lodges in other countries and in return is recognized by them, which allow its members to visit lodges throughout the world. It is governed as an association under Article 60 of the Swiss Civil Code and has its own constitution, statutes and regulations.

GLAS aims at the moral and ethical improvement of the members of its lodges by working on themselves, aided by ad hoc initiatory and symbolic ceremonies and close harmony between its members. More generally, the aim is to adopt a moral position and committed ethical behaviour within society. GLAS offers a broad spiritual approach and an initiatic pedagogy which retains a stance of privacy to its rituals, even if all the information on the arcane and the functioning of Freemasonry is easily accessible on the web and in specialized books. GLAS brethren belong mostly to the middle class.

== History of the obedience ==
The oldest GLAS lodges date back to the 18th century, such as L'Union des Cœurs in Geneva, founded in 1768, La Discrétion in Zurich, founded in 1772, dormant since 1786, to be reactivated in 1811 as Modestia cum Libertate, Les Vrais Frères Unis in Le Locle, founded in 1774, La Vraie Union in Nyon, founded in 1787, and Zur Freundschaft und Beständigkeit in Basel, founded in 1808.

Our roots are in the 18th century freemasonry; and at that time, many Helvetian lodges, often short-lived, were independent. But the hold of the Napoleonic empire led the Grand Orient of France to create several lodges under its leadership in the early 19th century.

After the Congress of Vienna, the French influence having ebbed away, lodges of French-speaking Switzerland created in 1811 a first umbrella structure, the Grand Orient Helvétique Romand. Then, these same lodges got closer to a lodge in Bern, Zur Hoffnung, still active, which had received a patent from the United Grand Lodge of England (hyperlink to the Wikipedia article), a friendly relation that remains in place. As a result, the Swiss National Grand Lodge was born in 1822. In 1844, after many attempts to rally more lodges, the Society of Swiss Alpina Lodges was born and covered a larger area of Switzerland. In 1913 this body took the definitive name of Grand Lodge Alpina of Switzerland. During these years, the number of lodges increased, either by existing lodges joining or by the foundation of new lodges. Some were even founded in tiny towns in the French-speaking Switzerland, such as the short-lived Nouvelle Étoile, in 1851, in Orbe (Vaud).

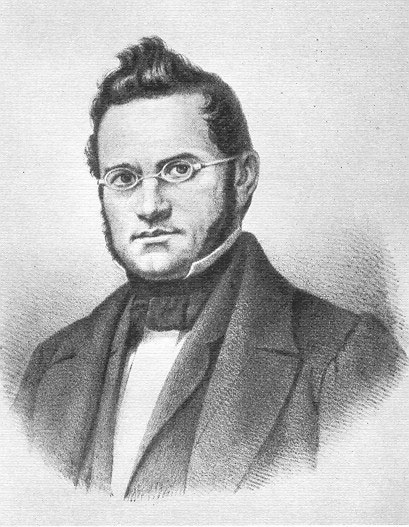
Jonas Furrer, founding member of the Swiss Confederation and President of the Confederation.

The GLSA never influenced Swiss politics on its own, but it inherited the values of the Enlightenment of the 18th century from the very beginning. Many of its members, claiming to follow this philosophy, were affiliated to the Radical Party, at the time a "left-wing" party. Some of them participated in the foundation of modern Switzerland. Jonas Furrer, born on 3 March 1805 in Winterthur and died on 25 July 1861 in Bad Ragaz, was the first president of the Swiss Confederation in 1848 and the first GLAS Great Speaker in 1844. Later, in the 1880s, the Vaud mason Louis Ruchonnet, born on 28 April 1834 in Lausanne and died on 14 September 1893 in Berne, Federal Councillor and President of the Confederation, who, by taking the economy into account in his vision, retained this social engagement.

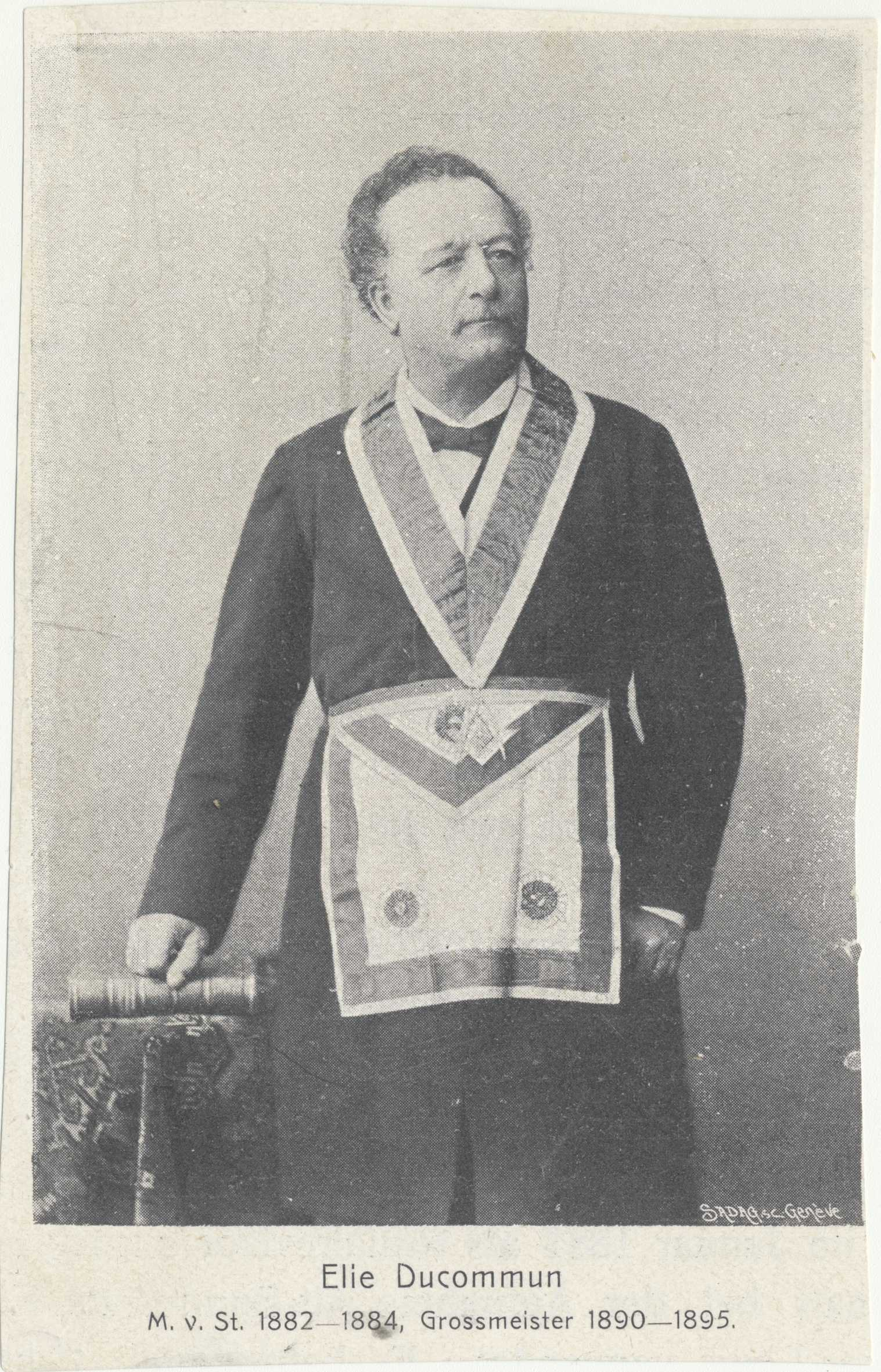
Elie Ducommun (1833–1906), Grand Master of GLAS, 1902 Nobel Peace Prize

The repositioning of the Radical Party, resulting from the rise of the Swiss Socialist Party, led to a gradual distancing between the changing values of this party and those of the GLSA membership, whose philanthropic, pacifist and moral contents increasingly became preeminent. The proof is the Genevan pacifist activist and 1902 Nobel Peace Prize winner Élie Ducommun, born on 19 February 1833 in Geneva and died on 7 December 1906 in Bern, former Grand Master of the GLSA from 1890 to 1895. In the same vein, between the two wars, the GLAS supported the creation of the League of Nations in Geneva, a project which, in Switzerland at that time was not unanimously supported... It also endeavoured, from 1921, in the same spirit of universal brotherhood for peace, inspired by Swiss neutrality, to build bridges between the world's Grand Lodges by the creation of a light ad hoc body, the International Masonic Association (IMA) : whose head office was in Switzerland. However, Anglo-Saxon Freemasonry, which was in the majority, did not join, because it did not approve of the French presence in the IMA.

After the First World War, during which the lodges were involved in philanthropy, the GLAS experienced a period of prosperity, as its membership increased significantly. This was short-lived. The economic crisis (the Wall Street Crash of 1929) at the end of the 1920s affected the financial resources of the members, and the rise of fascism was accompanied by virulent anti-Masonicism; there was mention of a "Judeo-Masonic conspiracy", and Freemasons were accused of all the evils. Many of them were arrested or interned in camps. The savagery of the Spanish fascist regime of General Franco was exemplary in this respect.

This movement had a more moderate impact in Switzerland, via the extreme right-wing factions in the country, which were financed underhandedly by Benito Mussolini and the Nazis. Thanks to the commitment of Swiss Masons and special funds from the GLAS, the Swiss popular initiative of the fascist and colonel Arthur Fonjallaz, later convicted of espionage in 1941, was rejected by 69% of the voters in 1937. Supported by certain Catholic factions, it had aimed to restrict the rights of association and to ban freemasonry. The fear of fascism resulting from this initiative, the resulting prejudices among part of the population, together with the effects of the Second World War had a deleterious effect on membership, which fell by 50%.

From 1945 onwards, GLAS became more active and Masonic life resumed, with modest but steady growth, until the pre-war membership was restored and even slightly exceeded. Nevertheless, like all societies, it now had to fight against the decline of voluntary associations and make its added value better known by making its values of the training of an upright human being, activity in society, with a spiritual underpinning rooted in tolerance, as a long-term task...

To strengthen its links with so-called universal Freemasonry (which respects the landmarks of the Old Charges), often referred to as regular Freemasonry, GLAS distanced itself from other French-speaking Grand Lodges, which led a few brethren of French-speaking Switzerland to create the Grand Orient de Suisse, a so-called liberal obedience, closer to the Grand Orient de France, in 1959. Shortly before, the International Masonic Association, which had somewhat resumed its activity, was dissolved, GLAS noting that an attempt to bring the different currents of Freemasonry closer together had become illusory.

From the 1970s onwards, like many other Masonic bodies, the number of lodges within the GLAS increased more rapidly than the number of members, with the result that lodges had fewer members. The influences of the analytical psychology of Carl Gustav Jung, the philosophy of Henri Corbin, the writings of Mircea Eliade, and even the writings of the French metaphysician René Guénon, to name but a few, led Freemasons to reconsider and deepen their tradition, as well as their symbolic toolkit. English-speaking lodges of the British Emulation Rite were also created. One of them, Rosslyn No. 87, is itinerant, like the old military lodges.

On 6 June 2009, at its General Assembly, following the policy of the United Grand Lodge of England, GLAS adopted a declaration concerning its relations with women's freemasonry in Switzerland, which recognises the judicious activity of the latter. It welcomes the sharing of joint actions, lectures, lectures or colloquia, except for its ritual activities and ceremonies, which remain strictly monogenous.

== GLAS Structure and Functioning ==
GLAS organisation and structure are inspired by the Swiss federalist system. Its functioning is characterised by :

- A great freedom of the Lodges; for instance, they are responsible for their rituals, with the GLAS having only a minor influence.
- A strong organisational autonomy. After fulfilling the basic condition of having at least 14 members, a lodge can freely organise its management and choose its working language.
- A light central administration system, where there is hardly any professionalisation of resources, except the Grand Chancellery.

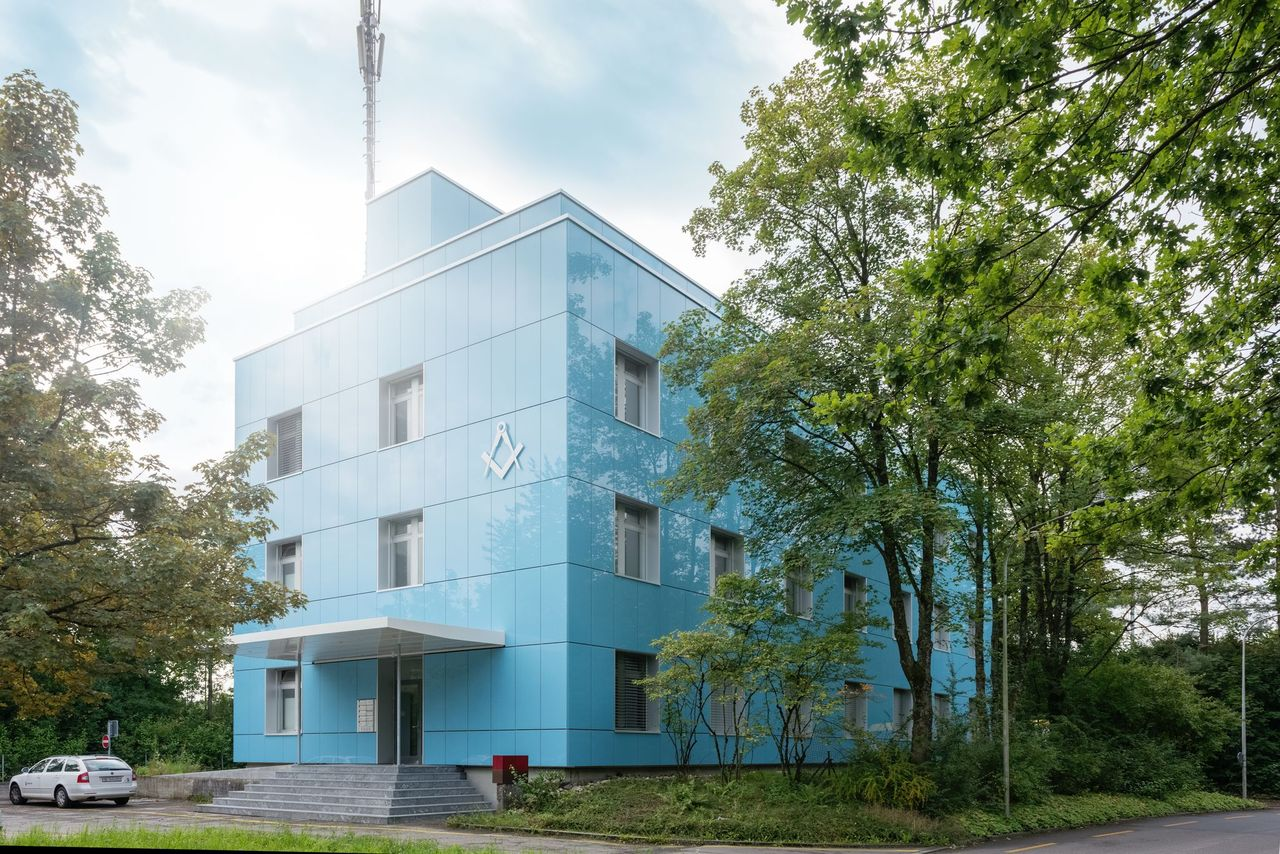
GLAS Headquarter in Berne

GLAS is mainly concerned with:

- The legal aspects of the GLAS Lodges, by applying the principles of its Constitution and specific regulations (finance, law, etc.), in accordance with Swiss legislation.
- The development and the management of international relations, since all international matters are primarily GLAS responsibility, e.g. the recognition of foreign Grand Lodges and the regulation of visits and/or contacts, etc.
- The appointment of the Deputy Masters of the lodges, representatives of the Grand Master, on the proposal of the lodges, as well as the installation of their Worshipful Masters.
- Awards to deserving lodge members.
- The coordination of collective activity, such as the management of the Assembly of Delegates, legislative body of the GLSA, and of the Assembly of Worshipful Masters and of Deputy Masters.

GLAS is managed by a Grand College, appointed for three years, and composed of a Grand Master who heads it, a Deputy Grand Master, a Grand Speaker, a Grand Secretary, a Grand Treasurer, composing the Steering Committee, and of Grand Officers representing each region of Switzerland.

GLAS has about 3,320 members (as at end 2022) and their average age is 61 years. The majority group within GLAS is represented by the French-speaking lodges (48%), followed by the German-speaking lodges (39%). Those working in English (6.7%) and Italian (6.3%) are in the minority, although there are new English-speaking lodges in the Lake Geneva area, as well as in Basel and Zurich, probably because of the high level of immigration of skilled workers to Switzerland over the last 15 years.

== Recognition ==
The Grand Lodge Alpina is recognised by the United Grand Lodge of England (UGLE). UGLE recognition is a significant indicator of a Regular Masonic jurisdiction. Although traditionally linked to the more liberal Continental Freemasonry of the Grand Orient de France, Alpina became closer to the United Grand Lodge of England after World War II, leading to official recognition. As a result, some liberal members left the Grand Lodge, and ultimately set up the rival Grand Orient de Suisse.

Many members of the Grand Lodge Alpina also belong to the Helvetica Lodge No 4894 (UGLE) in London, which exists to serve Swiss freemasons in England, and to cement Anglo-Swiss relations.

== Lodge activities ==
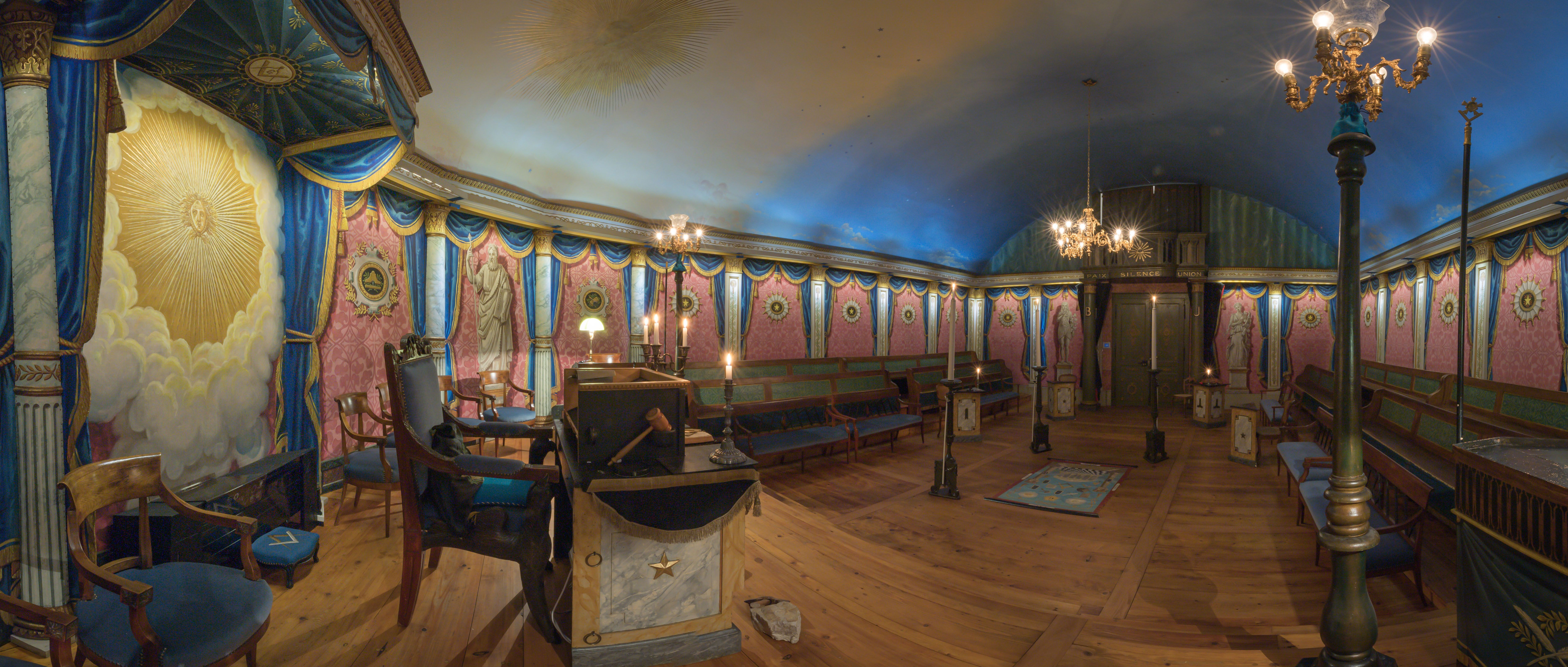
Masonic Temple in La Chaux-de-Fonds

GLAS lodges are highly differentiated organisationally, with a minimum of 14 and a maximum of 130 members, and in practice a median size of 42. They are led by a committee with a small number of members. Most important of these are the Worshipful Master, who leads the lodge de facto in a collegiate manner, two Wardens, a Master of Ceremonies, a Speaker, a Secretary, not forgetting a Treasurer and an Almoner, who looks after absent or sick Brethren.

The phrase that characterizes the GLAS's spirit of Masonic perfection can be formulated in the following terms: the Freemason must perfect himself, without waiting for an external initiative, but beyond his life here below, a horizon opens up to him that gives him a glimpse of the Love of the True, of the Good and of the Beautiful, a mode of action and ideal close to ancient philosophy, represented in a sense by the Great Architect of the Universe. What about this last term, which is often discussed?

GLAS Masonic ideal is broader than Jean de Lafontaine's saying in the fable of The Mired Carter : God helps those who help themselves. Indeed, from its origin, the Grand Lodge integrate ancient customs, later called landmarks, which are essentially:

- The reference to the Old Charges, first texts describing the framework and functioning of the lodges of masons and stonemasons, dating from the 15th to the early years of the 18th century. These include the belief in the existence of a Great Architect of the Universe, a Supreme Being from whom everything is derived, together with the presence on the altar, at the east of the lodge temple, of a "Book of Sacred Law", which may be the Bible, the Koran, the Torah, the Buddhist Tripitaka, the Upanishads, or any other canonical text of a religious movement, as well as a square and a compass, which are placed on the said book at the opening of the lodge. Book of the Sacred Law, square and compass are called the Three Great Lights.
- The perception of an entity, which transcends the created universe, but which the GLAS allows its members great freedom to conceive, tempers the prevailing scientific materialism. The later has given rise to the consumerism whose environmental and societal ravages are now obvious. At the same time, the tolerance which reigns in the lodge prevents any political extremism and religious imperialism which could alienate the existential freedom and aspirations of any human being. GLAS therefore promotes the respects of all sincere convictions and rejects any opposition to freedom of thought.
- A clear separation between the lodges that practice the first three degrees of Freemasonry and those practicing higher degrees (Masonic High Grades), thus avoiding a hierarchy that has sometimes made the former an antechamber of the second, and not as being independent and sovereign bodies.

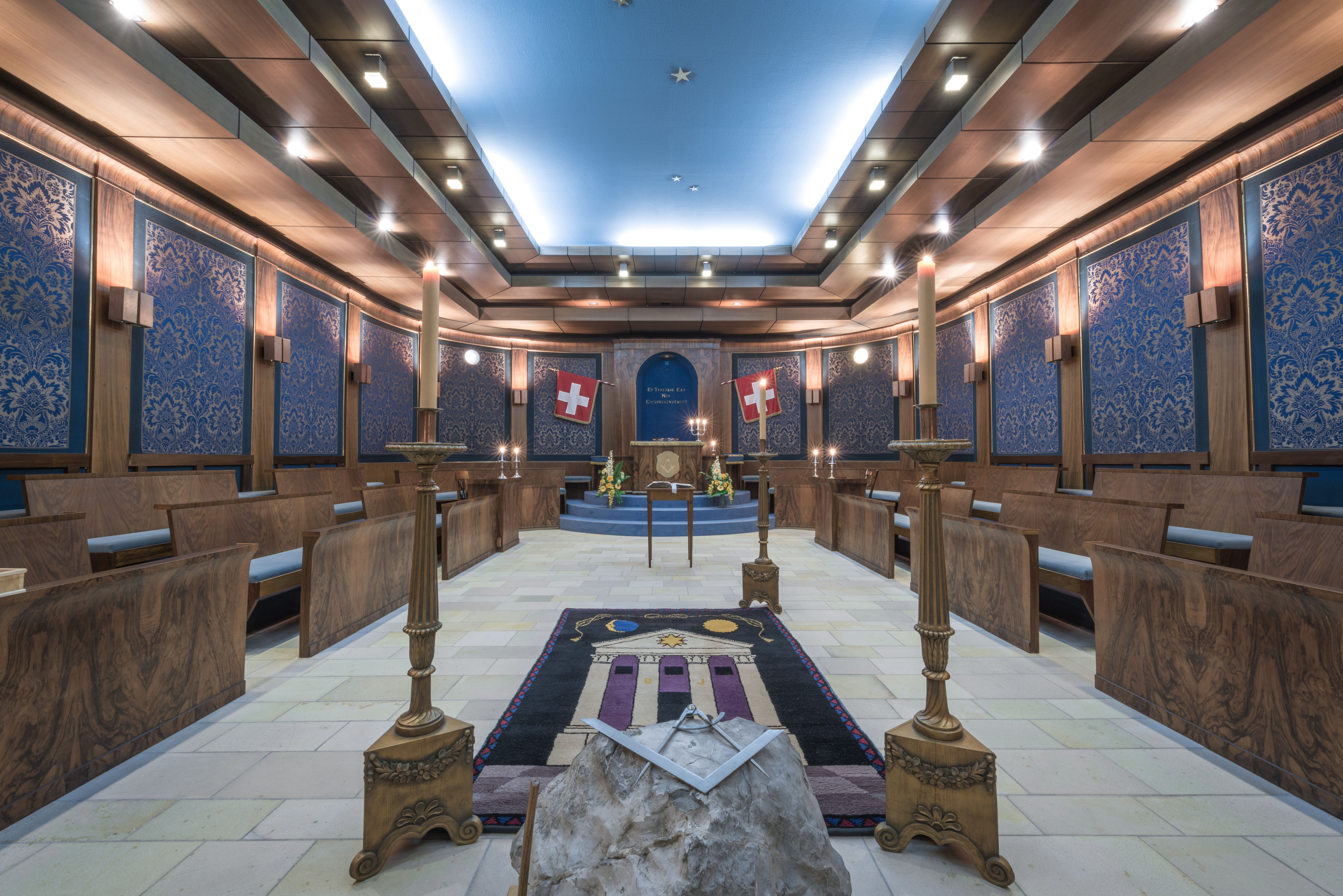
A GLAS Swiss Temple

GLAS Brethren practice, in their temples, the ceremonies of the three grades (Apprentice, Fellowcraft and Master Mason) of symbolic Freemasonry (also known as blue Freemasonry). They are grouped into Masonic rites each with its own specific values, references and rituals:

- Ancient and Accepted Scottish Rite (mostly in German, French and Italian).
- Rectified Scottish Rite (in German and French).
- Schroeder Rite (in German and French); a few GLAS lodges practise a Schroeder ritual with additions from the Rectified Scottish Rite, created by the GLAS in the late 19th century.
- Emulation Rite, in English, German and French.
- Modern French Rite, in French.
- Ruchon Rite, in French, a specificity of a few lodges.
- Ancient and Primitive Rite of Memphis Misraim, in French.

The Masonic Temple, in which the Brethren activity takes place, is a location outside secular time, symbolically situated on the construction site of the first Temple of Jerusalem of King Solomon, son of David, where Hebrews and Gentiles worked together, seen here as a first sign of religious tolerance and universal brotherhood.

Brethren meet twice or once a month, sometimes weekly. They attend ceremonies, often initiations to the grade of Apprentice, Fellowcraft or Master Mason, in which the mysteries of the degree are disclosed to them, an initiatic pedagogy. Indeed, for Freemasons, the Light appears step by step. Brethren also display and communicate the results of their meditations and research, often of a philosophical nature, upon these degrees. But presentations on current topics, excluding all political and religious debates, are also included only for intellectual enrichment and self-development. Philanthropic activities and donations are also on the agenda, even if the Anglo-Saxon Grand Lodges are more active in this respect. Within GLAS, there is a difference between the German speaking and the French-speaking Lodges, the former being more intensely involved in charitable activities. Finally, the fraternal agape strengthens the links between the members of the workshop in a convivial atmosphere.

The time length it takes to move from one degree to another varies according to each Brother and his zeal, and is most often between one and two years. Once the content of these three degrees has been meditated upon and assimilated (but one remains an Apprentice for life), the Master Mason may join, for further exposure to the principles of Freemasonry, appendant bodies of Freemasonry, such as the Rectified Scottish Rite, the Ancient and Accepted Scottish Rite, or even one (or many) side degrees of British-inspired freemasonry such as Mark Masonry, Royal Arch Masonry, etc.

== Communication ==
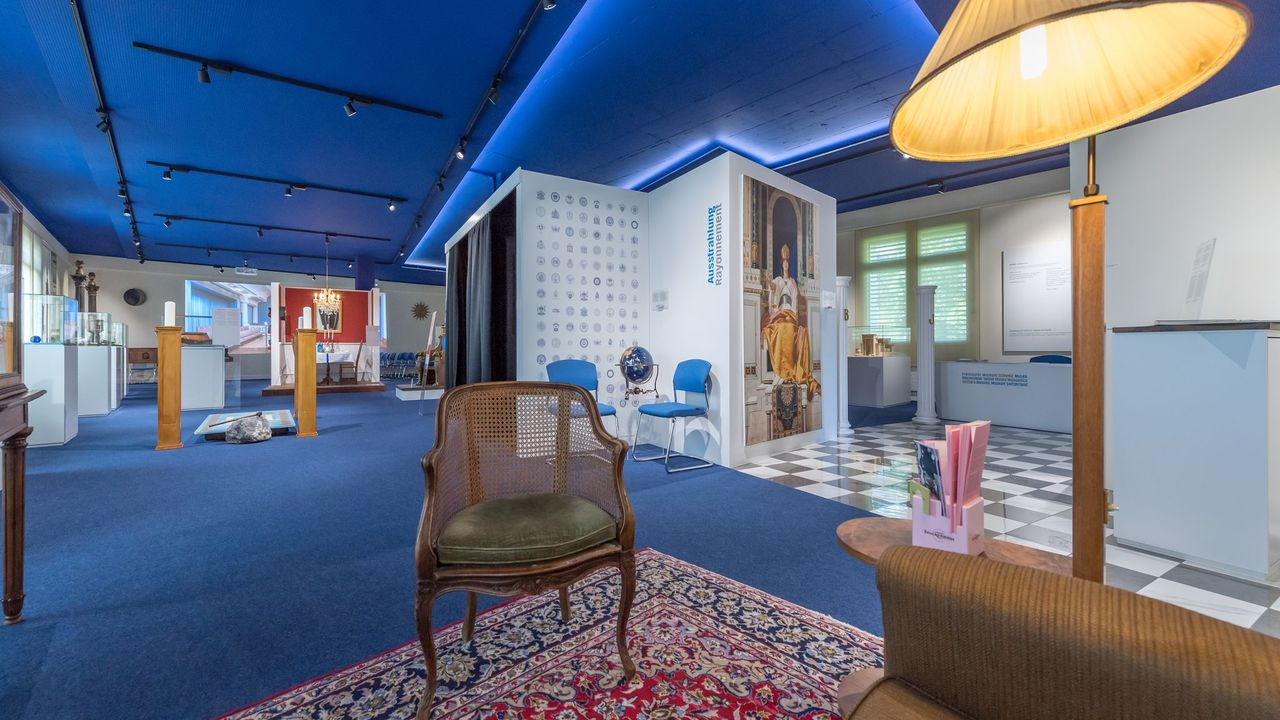
Masonic Museum Switzerland

GLAS proscribes any active recruitment, but seeks to communicate its existence, its objectives, its mode of improvement of the human being. For this purpose:

- Most lodges regularly open their lodge buildings to visitors, or invite anyone to lectures or talks in their premises.
- GLAS publishes Alpina, Swiss Masonic magazine. Founded in 1874, it has articles in German, French, Italian and English. Selected articles in PDF format are regularly posted on GLAS website.
- GLAS and some of its members frequently participate in radio and television broadcasts. Its participation in the latter medium dates back to 1965.
- The Swiss Masonic Museum is located on the premises of the GLAS in Bern and aims to make the Order and its specificities better known. Visits are organised and anyone can sign up.
- The Bibliotheca Masonica August Belz in St. Gallen has a vast collection of multilingual documents and historical books on Freemasonry which anyone can consult.
- The Alpina Research Group (ARG) organises biannual conferences, colloquia and publishes Masonica, a Masonic journal which brings together the results of its research. ARG also published the "Guide Suisse du Franc-Maçon" in two volumes, in French or German, which can be purchased either from the GRA website or in bookshops.

GLAS members are invited to consider whether anyone close to them has the aptitude and desire to join a lodge. However, many applications nowadays come via the internet, through lodge portals.

== Brief bibliography ==
- Andrey, Georges, La Franc-maçonnerie à Fribourg et en Suisse du XVIIIe au XXe siècle, Slatkine, Geneva, 2001.
- Bauer, Alain, Dachez, Roger et al., Le Livre de la franc-maçonnerie, Que Sais-je, 2019.
- Benhmou, Philippe, La Franc-maçonnerie pour les Nuls, France Loisirs, 2006.
- Cugnet, Michel, Deux siècles et demi de Franc-maçonnerie en Suisse et dans le pays de Neuchâtel, La Chaux-de-Fonds, éditions du Chevron, 1991.
- Cugnet, Michel, Qui se cache derrière la franc-maçonnerie, éditions de l'Hèbe, 2019.
- Cugnet, Michel, Fantini, Fausto, Outils et symboles, Slatkine Reprints, 2019.
- Dachez, Roger, De Salomon à James Anderson - L'invention de la franc-maçonnerie, éditions Dervy, January 2023.
- Freymond, Dominique Alain, Les libertés fondamentales, véritables enjeux de l’initiative Fonjallaz, in La franc-maçonnerie, : de l’ombre à la lumière, in Revue historique vaudoise 130/2022, pp. 147–164.
- Guide Suisse du Franc-Maçon, tome I, Histoire et Rites, tome II, Diversité des obédiences dans le monde, under the auspices of GLSA, Alpina Research Group edition, 2017 and 2021.
- Hivert-Messeca, Yves, L'Europe sous l'acacia - Histoire des Franc-Maçonneries européennes du XVIIIe siècle à nos jours, volumes I and II, éditions Dervy, 2012 and 2014.
- Jaccard, Michel, La naissance de la loge Liberté à Lausanne et le legs de Louis Ruchonnet, in Revue historique vaudoise 130/2022, pp. 101–116.
- Landerer, Armin, Freimaurerei und die Schweiz, Salier Verlag, 2021.
- Mainguy, Irène, La symbolique maçonnique du 3e millénaire, éditions Dervy, 2003.

== Grand Masters ==
- 1844–1850 : Johann Jakob Hottinger (1783–1860)
- 1850–1856 : Karl Gustav Jung (1794–1864)
- 1856–1862 : Abram Daniel Meystre (1813–1870)
- 1862–1868 : Ernst F. Gelpke (1807–1870)
- 1868–1871 : Johann Jakob Rüegg (1830–1884)
- 1871–1874 : Aimé Humbert (1819–1900)
- 1874–1878 : Karl Tscharner (1812)
- 1878–1884 : John Cuénod (1822–1900)
- 1884–1890 : Ernst Karl Jung (1841–1912)
- 1890–1895 : Élie Ducommun (1833–1906)
- 1895–1900 : Caspar Friedrich Hausmann (1845–1920)
- 1900–1905 : Édouard Quartier-la-Tente (1855–1925)
- 1905–1910 : Hermann Häberlin (1862–1938)
- 1910–1915 : Jacques Oettli (1843–1927)
- 1915–1920 : Jakob Schwenter (1857–1938)
- 1920–1925 : Isaac Reverchon (1868–1927)
- 1925–1930 : Fritz Brandenberg (1865–1942)
- 1930–1935 : Auguste Jeanneret (1867–1947)
- 1935–1939 : Kurt von Sury (1882–1977)
- 1939–1942 : Edmond Jomini (1900–1956)
- 1942–1947 : Josef Böni (1895–1974)
- 1947–1952 : Albert Natural (1880–1960)
- 1952–1957 : Walther Kasser (1886–1977)
- 1957–1961 : Theodor Hinnen (1904–1961)
- 1961–1962 : Harald Ziegler (1906–1977)
- 1962–1966 : Charles Sthioul (1898–1988)
- 1966–1969 : Walter Winter (1890–)
- 1969–1970 : Gubert Giger (1903–1982)
- 1970–1974 : Willy Wyser (1923)
- 1974–1978: Paul Bauhofer (1909)
- 1978–1982 : Orazio Schaub (1922)
- 1982–1984 : Alain Marti (1944) (Note: À la suite de la décision prise par la majorité des loges suisses alémaniques contre une minorité de loges romandes de reconnaître la Grande Loge régulière de Belgique et d'enlever sa reconnaissance à la Grande Loge de Belgique, ainsi qu'exigé par la Grande Loge unie d'Angleterre. Grande Loge suisse Alpina 1993, p. 136.)
- 1986–1990 : Walter von Ins (1922)
- 1990–1994 : André Binggeli (1925)
- 1994–1997 : Hans Bühler
- 1997–2000 : Jean-Jacques Sunier
- 2001–2004 : Alberto Menasche (1936)
- 2005–2009 : Bruno Welti
- 2010–2014 : Jean-Michel Mascherpa (1942)
- 2015–2018 : Maurice Zahnd
- 2019–2022 : Dominique Juilland (1953)
