= Émile Digneffe =

Belgian lawyer, banker, businessman, Walloon activist and liberal politician

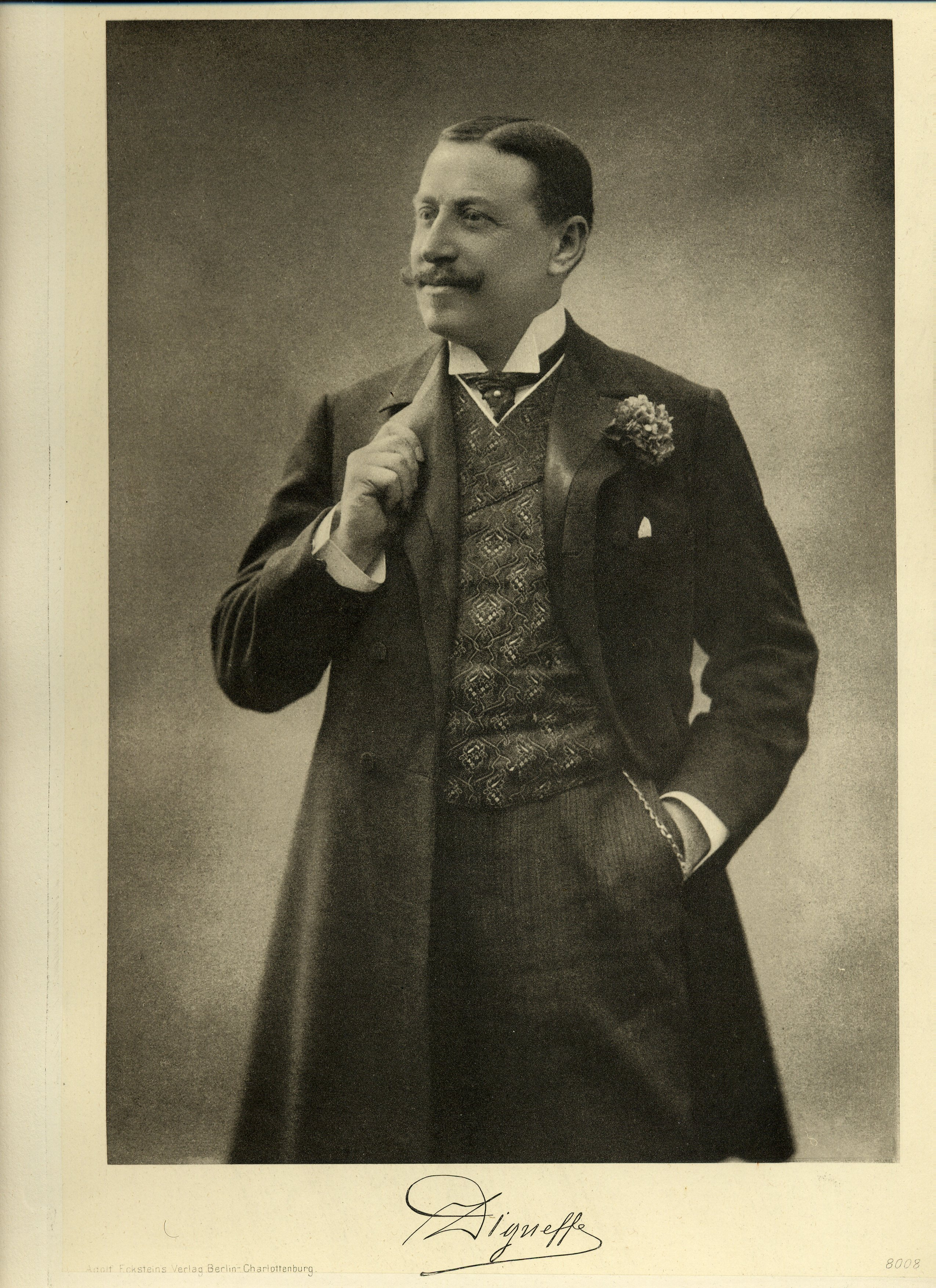

President of the Senate
- In office 27 December 1932 – 13 November 1934
- Preceded by: Charles Magnette
- Succeeded by: Maurice Lippens

Personal details
- Born: 20 December 1858 Liège, Belgium
- Died: 16 June 1937 (aged 78) Liège, Belgium
- Party: Liberal Party

Émile Edouard Charles Louis Digneffe (French: [diɲɛf]; 20 December 1858 – 16 June 1937) was a Belgian lawyer, banker, businessman, a Walloon activist and liberal politician.

He was alderman and burgomaster of Liège, a member of the Belgian parliament and President of the Belgian Senate from 27 December 1932 until 11 August 1934.

== honours ==
- 1932: Knight Grand Cross in the Order of the Crown.

== See also ==
- Liberal Party
- Liberalism in Belgium

== Sources ==
- Emile Digneffe
- Van Molle, P., Het Belgisch parlement 1894–1969, Gent, Erasmus, 1969, p. 129.
- Caulier-Mathy, Nicole, in : Kurgan-van Hentenrijk, Ginette, Jaumain, Serge, Montens, Valérie, a.o., Dictionnaire des patrons en Belgique. Les hommes, les entreprises, les reseaux, Brussel, De Boeck Université, 1996, p. 242–243.
- D'Hoore, Marc, in : Delforge, Paul, Destatte Philippe, Libon, Micheline (ed.), Encyclopédie du Mouvement wallon, Charleroi, Institut Jules Destrée, 2001, 3 dl., p. 502–503.

Political offices
Preceded by Charles Magnette	President of the Senate; 1932–1934	Succeeded by Maurice Lippens
