= Maggette =

Maggette or Magette is a surname. Notable people with the surname include:

- Corey Maggette (born 1979), American basketball player
- Josh Magette (born 1989), American basketball player

== See also ==
- Magnette
