= Freemasonry in Luxembourg =

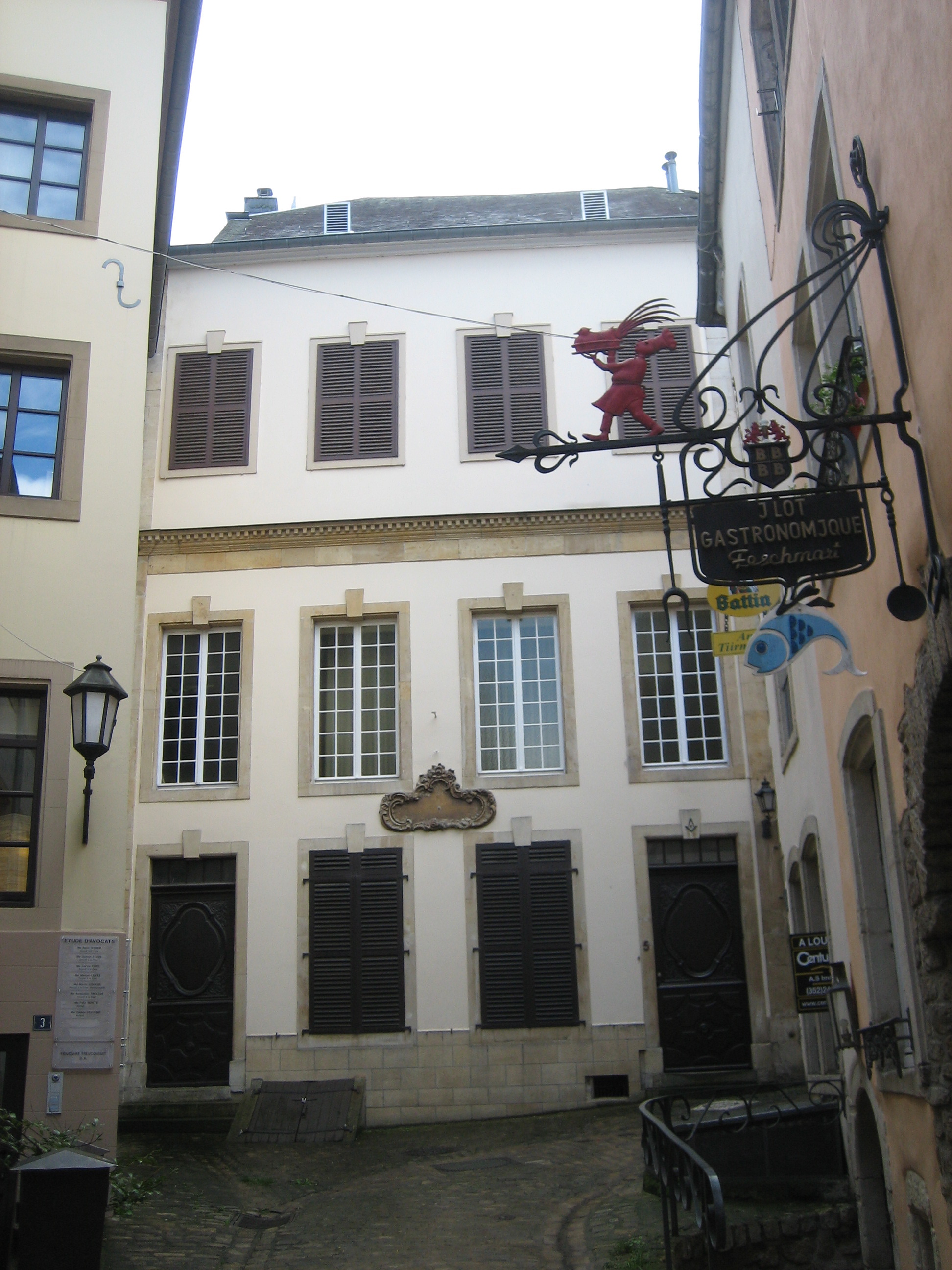
Freemasonry Lodge in Luxembourg City in the Rue de la Loge

Freemasonry in Luxembourg traces its local origins to the 18th century. Though the practice of Freemasonry was suppressed by the reigning Austrian Habsburg dynasty, it enjoyed a revival under Napoleonic rule that persisted after the close of his reign. After their initial founding, Masonic lodges in Luxembourg rapidly developed strong ties with their French and Belgian counterparts. While suppressed again under Nazi rule, postwar Freemasonry forged stronger ties with the Anglo-American extension of the brotherhood, though the oldest lodges still use the French form of Masonic ritual.

== Origins ==
Freemasonry first appeared in Luxembourg in the 18th century. It was also the provincial Grand Lodge of the Austrian Netherlands which established the first permanent Lodge in 1770. This was a semi-military, semi-civilian Lodge, with the title "The Perfect Union", where garrison members and local notables encountered each other. The Freemasonry was later suppressed by Austrian Emperor Joseph II, and the Lodge disappeared. However, Freemasonry was to reappear under similar conditions when Luxembourg was annexed in the French Revolutionary Wars, becoming the Département des Forêts, home to military Lodges of the French regiments. It was the Grand Orient of France which in 1803 granted a charter to the new civilian Lodge, under the title of "The Children of Fortified Concord".

== Napoleon's defeat ==
Napoleon's defeat and the Congress of Vienna saw Luxembourg (after this ruled by the King of the Netherlands) lose territory to Prussia. These events destroyed the Masonic ties between the Grand Orient of France and the Lodge of the "Children of fortified Concord", who now passed under the Grand Lodge of the Southern provinces of the Netherlands. However, in the same way that many of the French innovations were left in place (e.g. administrative reforms, the Code Civil), so too the Lodge in Luxembourg continued to work according to the French Rite and in the French language. Luxembourg Freemasons in fact managed to acquire a certain level of autonomy, since the Dutch occupiers tended not to participate in Luxembourg Masonic life. This autonomy was reinforced in 1818 when they acquired the "Hôtel de la Loge" as their own premises.

== Independence and internationalism ==
After 1839, the Grand Duchy of Luxembourg became an independent state, after ceding its western, French-speaking territories, which became part of Belgium. The Lodge of the Children of fortified Concord left what had now become the Grand Orient of Belgium, and in 1844 constituted itself as a central Lodge.

Despite the reduction in the country's territory, and the rupture of its previous institutional ties, Luxembourgish masonry maintained a high degree of openness to other countries. This is due in part to the country's small size, immigration in the late 19th century, and a tradition of the cohabitation of different cultural and linguistic groups in one geographic area.

This can be attributed to the fact that Luxembourgish Freemasons maintained close ties to their French and Belgian brothers. This was partly because only one chapter existed in Luxembourg, so that those seeking to advance to the higher degrees of Freemasonry, had to do so in France or Belgium. Additionally, from 1815 to 1867, when the country was declared neutral, the capital city was a fortress of the German Confederation, and therefore hosted a large Prussian garrison. This entailed the presence of the military Lodge "Blücher von Wahlstatt", attached to the "Große Nationale Mutterloge zu den drei Weltkugeln" in Berlin. The Lodge of the Children of fortified Concord agreed to share premises with this German-speaking Lodge. This cohabitation involved both Lodges preserving their independence, their rites and their own language, but also entailed an agreement not to compete for the recruitment of members, coordinating charitable works and mutually organised events. The fraternal ties with the Blücher von Wahlstatt Lodge have been maintained to this day, even after its departure for Berlin in 1867.

At the time, these ties were, for Luxembourgish Freemasonry, a sort of counter-weight to the influence of francophone Latin Masonry.

The experience of this symbiosis of Gallic and Germanic influences showed its purpose when ties were broken off between German and French Freemasons after 1870 in a time of political tensions; Luxembourgish Masons assumed the role of a mediator between the two Freemasonries. Thus, Luxembourgish Masons set about organising meetings between their German and French brothers, whilst engaging in a multilateral effort with Masons from Switzerland, Hungary, the Netherlands, and Belgium. The same internationalist approach was upheld during World War I and the interwar period, when Luxembourgish Freemasons created two organisations to bring aid to war victims.

While it developed international relations focused on continental Europe, Luxembourgish Freemasons organised themselves into a Grand Lodge in 1926, while also suffering attacks from Catholic ultramontanists and the influence of positivism, and therefore became more secularised and more politicised, similarly to the Grand Orients of Belgium and France.

== Post-World War II ==
After suppression under Nazi rule, Luxembourgish Freemasons revived their traditions anew. Previously severed ties with English Freemasonry were restored after years of conflict between English and Luxembourgish Masons, which fostered a newfound sense of international unity within the order. This normalisation process was carried out by a council of several Grand Lodges throughout Europe, including participants from the Netherlands, Switzerland, Germany, Austria, and, briefly, France. This was inspired in part by the desire to return Luxembourgish Freemasonry to its symbolic and spiritualistic aspects, after these had been neglected due to the high concentration of British troops in continental Europe during the 1950s.

Luxembourgish Freemasonry actively and broadly supported the revitalisation of the order with the reintroduction of the Grand Architect of the Universe symbol and the Bible as a source of sacred law in 1953, and the ratification of the Convention of Luxembourg in 1954.

This reorientation however came at the price of severed ties with the Masons of France and Belgium who were now regarded as heretical.

By 1969 the international relations of Luxembourgish Freemasonry developed to the point that the Grand Lodge of Luxembourg was recognised by the United Grand Lodge of England.

The Grand Lodge consisted of approximately 300 members with the number of Lodges growing from one to three in the post-war period, and then adding a fourth and fifth Lodge in 1974 and 1997 respectively.

The three oldest Lodges, "The Children of the Fortified Concord", the "Perfect Union", and "St. John of Hope", use the French language and a ritual descended from the French Rite. This, however, has been strongly influenced by the Scottish Rite, and a series of local adaptations. The English-speaking Lodge "Friendship" was founded in 1974. Finally, the German-speaking Lodge "Zur Bruderkette" uses the rite of the Grand Lodge of Ancient Free and Accepted Masons of Germany.

== Notable members ==
- Charles-Theodore André
- Gaspard-Théodore-Ignace de la Fontaine
- Jean-Baptiste Nothomb
- Antoine Pescatore
- Théodore Pescatore
- Jean-Baptiste Thorn
- Jean-Mathias Wellenstein
- Mathias Lefort
