= Fernand Cocq =

Belgian politician (1861–1940)

Alphonse Lambert Joseph Fernand Cocq (5 July 1861 in Huy – 11 December 1940 in Ixelles) was a Belgian Liberal politician who served as Minister of Justice.

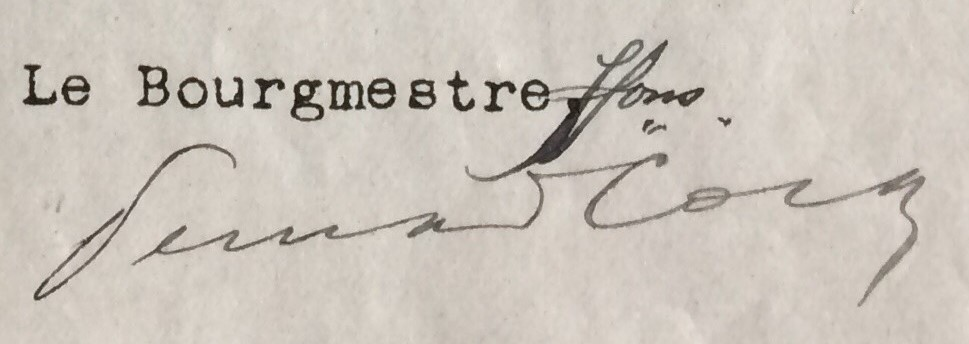
Fernand Cocq signature, 1918.

== Career ==
After studying law and becoming a lawyer, Cocq began his political career in Ixelles, where he was founder of the local Ligue wallonne. He was elected as member of the local council in 1890, and served as alderman, 1900–1919, and then as mayor, 1919–1921.

From 1909 to 1936, he also sat in the Chamber of Representatives as a Liberal member for Brussels, serving as deputy speaker 1930–1931. He became Minister of Justice in the government of Jules Renkin, which took office on 6 June 1931. The government fell in October the following year, leading to the early 1932 Belgian general election.

Cocq was initiated as a Freemason in 1884, and went on to become Grand Master of the Grand Orient of Belgium two times: 1902–1904, and 1911–1913.

== Honours ==
- 1932: knight grand Cross in the Order of the Crown.

Masonic offices
Preceded by Gustave Royers	Grand Master of the Grand Orient of Belgium; 1902–1904	Succeeded by Jean-Laurent Hasse
Preceded by Joseph Descamps	Grand Master of the Grand Orient of Belgium; 1911–1913	Succeeded by Charles Magnette
