= Ovide Decroly =

Belgian psychologist (1871–1932)

Jean-Ovide Decroly
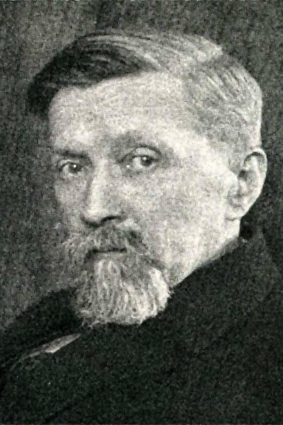
- Born: 23 July 1871; Ronse
- Died: 10 September 1932 (aged 61); Uccle
- Occupations: Teacher and psychologist

Jean-Ovide Decroly (Ronse, 23 July 1871 – Uccle, 10 September 1932) was a Belgian teacher and psychologist.

== Early life and education ==
He studied medicine at the University of Ghent, with half a year at the University of Berlin where he studied the action of toxins and antitoxins on general nutrition in 1898. He later worked with (mentally) handicapped children at the neurological clinic in Brussels.

== Educational legacy ==
Decroly founded The Hermitage School in 1907. Nowadays the "Ecole Decroly" (based in Uccle, Brussels, a school reaching from kindergarten to baccalaureate) follows his pedagogical approach.

== Personal life ==
Decroly was a freemason, and a member of the lodge Les Amis Philanthropes of the Grand Orient of Belgium in Brussels.

== The Decroly plan ==
The Decroly plan laid ground rules for social adaptation of a biological organism, in the concrete case, children. It concluded that schooling is needed for children to meet their biosocial needs. Followers of Decroly have gone on to create and start schools that primarily focus on these "biosocial needs", and better augment the student's educational experience.

== Quotes ==
- To educate in its fullest sense is to create conditions in which the child can live - and is led by these conditions led to live-as fully as possible through each succeeding stage of his development, meeting and solving in his own experience the problems of each stage as it comes, and so gaining the power to meet and to solve the problems that await him in further stages. Such conditions it is for a school to provide. (Decroly cited by J.H. Badley, Dr. Ovide Decroly ed. Albert Decordier, Amicale Rijksbasisonderwijs, Ronse, Belgium)
