= Serene Grand Orient of Greece =

Masonic Grand Lodge in Greece

The Serene Grand Lodge of Greece is a Masonic Grand Lodge in Greece. The name was originally used by an organisation which existed from 1815 to 1843. After that time the Grand Lodge of Greece took its place. The present organisation under the name of the Serene Grand Lodge of Greece was refounded in 1986 by former members of the Grand Lodge. Today, they are firmly associated with Liberal Freemasonry, belonging to ISMAP and now CLIPSAS.

== History ==
=== Serene Grand Lodge of Greece, 1815—1843 ===
Freemasonry in Greece originated at the end of the 18th century on the Ionian Islands. At the time they were ruled by Venice and at Corfu in 1782 the Loggia Beneficenza was founded practicing the Rectified Scottish Rite, under the jurisdiction of Verona. Freemasonry was suppressed in 1785 in Venice and the Lodge closed. After Napoleon Bonaparte conquered the Venetian Empire, the lodge was revived in 1797 in Corcyre, until 1800 when the Russian Empire established the Septinsular Republic and suppressed Freemasonry. After the Treaty of Tilsit, the islands fell un der the First French Empire and thus Freemasonry was revived again. Two lodges in Corfu were merged as Beneficenza-Filogenia Riunite.

The leader of this lodge, Count Dionisios Romas, was keen to establish recognition. First, on 21 November 1811, he applied to the Grand Orient de France to make it a Provincial Mother Lodge. This was accepted and new lodges sprung up. A new political reality emerged in 1815, when the United States of the Ionian Islands was established under the protection of the British Empire. At this time, Romas renamed the lodge the Serene Grand Lodge of Greece and eventually lodges were formed at Zante, Cephalonia, Lefkas and Patras. Roma decided to ask his friend, Augustus, Duke of Sussex, who was then the Grand Master of the United Grand Lodge of England, if he would become the Grand Master. Politically, Romas was hoping to get the British onside for the liberation of Greece from the Ottoman Empire (on the eve of the Greek War of Independence).
