= Goswin de Stassart =

Dutch-Belgian politician

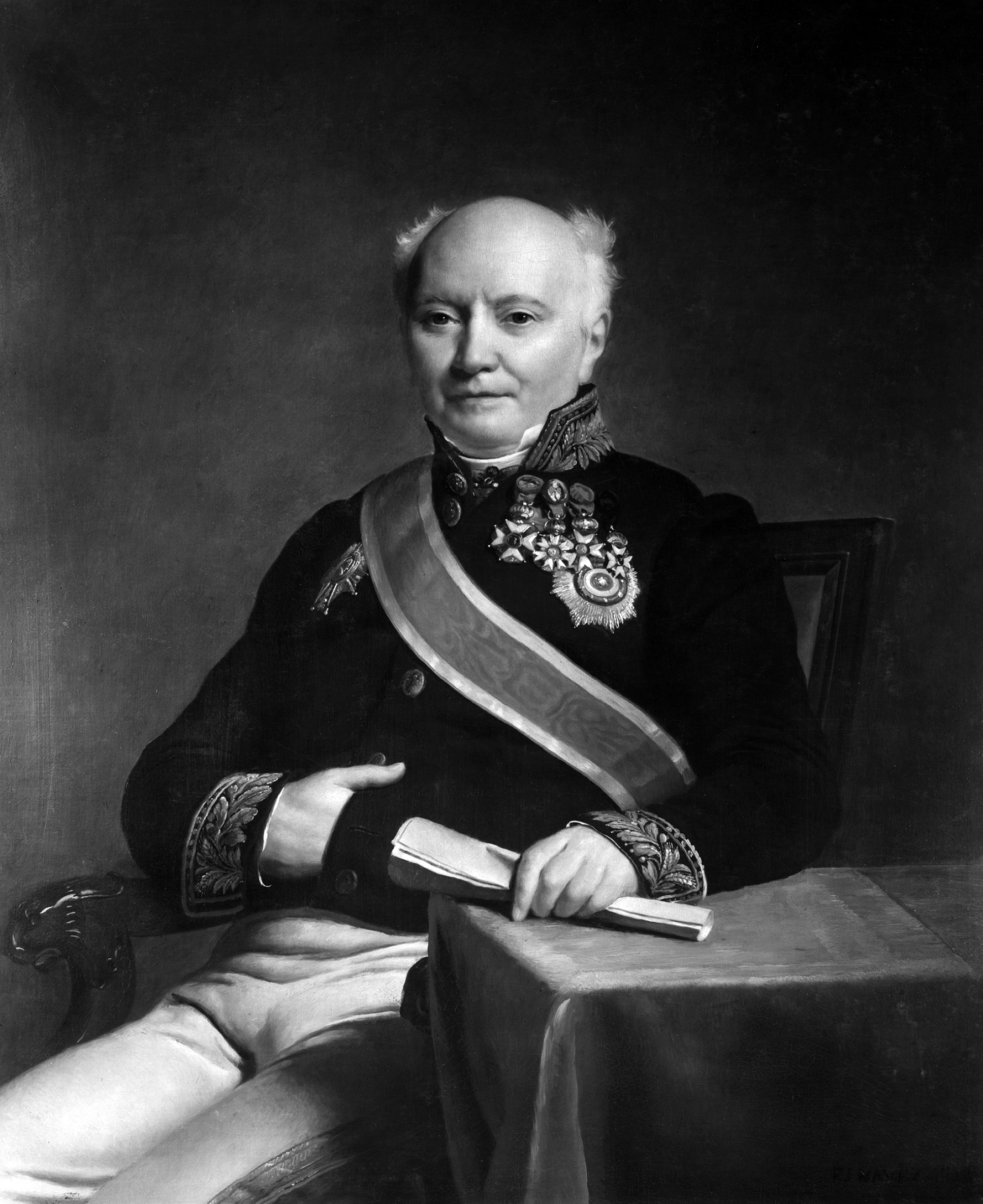

President of the Senate
- In office 12 September 1831 – 13 November 1838
- Preceded by: Position established
- Succeeded by: Louis de Schiervel

Personal details
- Born: 2 September 1780 Mechelen, Austrian Netherlands (now Belgium)
- Died: 16 October 1854 (aged 74) Brussels, Belgium
- Party: Liberal Party

Goswin Joseph Augustin, Baron de Stassart (2 September 1780 – 16 October 1854) was a Dutch-Belgian politician.

Stassart studied accounting and economics in Paris. In 1804 he became Auditor in the French State Council, in 1805 he became Intendant in Tirol, and in 1807 he served in the French army in Prussia. In 1810 he became Prefect of the Departments of the Vaucluse and in 1811 of the Estuaries of the Meuse. After the second Austrian restoration he lived on his estate near Namur, until the city of Namur in 1822 sent him to the second chamber of parliament of the Netherlands, where he belonged to the opposition.

After the outbreak of the Belgian revolution in Brussels in September 1830 he was among the delegates of the southern provinces, which were summoned to The Hague. In 1831 he returned to Belgium, where he became a member of the National Congress and a member of the Provisional Government as well as the Senate. In this position he served seven parliamentary sessions as president of the parliament. In 1834 he was appointed by the government as the governor of Brabant. However, in 1838 he had to resign both. In 1840 he became for a short time envoy in Turin.

== Honours ==
- 1833 : Member of the Royal Academy of Science, Letters and Fine Arts of Belgium.
- 1835 : President of the Royal academie.
- Knight grand Cross in the Order of Saint Stanislaus.
- Knight in the Order of Merit of the Bavarian Crown.
- Knight in the Order of the Polar Star

== Sources ==
- Goswin de Stassart

Political offices
New office	President of the Senate; 1831–1838	Succeeded by Louis de Schiervel
Masonic offices
Preceded by Joseph-Marie de Frenne	Grand Master of the Grand Orient of Belgium; 1835–1842	Succeeded by Eugène Defacqz
