= Félix Magnette =

Belgian historian (1868–1942)

Félix Magnette (9 December 1868 – 1942) was a Belgian historian from Liège.

== Life ==
Cette photo provient de la Chronique archéologique du Pays de Liège, 33e année, 1942

Magnette was born in Arlon on 9 December 1868 and was educated at the Athénée de Liège and University of Liège, where he studied under Godefroid Kurth, and graduated in 1892 with a Ph.D. on Joseph II and navigation on the Scheldt, supervised by Eugène Hubert. His first article, "Guillaume d'Orange et la Pacification de Gand", was published in the Revue de l'Instruction Publique in 1891. In 1893 he was awarded a travel bursary and spent two years studying abroad in Vienna, Munich and Paris.

On his return he spent three years teaching at the Athénée de Mons and another two at the Athénée de Chimay, transferring to the Athénée de Liège in 1901. He was to remain there for another twenty-seven years, in his free time carrying out historical research that applied the standards of academic research to local history. In 1923 an opening at the university provided him an opportunity to teach at an academic level part-time, and in 1928 he transferred to the university full-time. He retired in 1939, but returned to teaching in 1940 to replace a colleague who had been called up and become a prisoner of war.

His brother was the politician Charles Magnette.

== Publications ==
Magnette published numerous articles in the Bulletin de l'Institut archéologique liégeois, the Chronique archéologique du Pays de Liège, La Vie wallonne and the Revue Belge de Philologie et d'Histoire.

His best known work was Précis d'histoire liégeoise (1924), which was awarded a prize by Liège city council as a work that could be used in schools to "extend knowledge of the rich and eventful past of our city".

His other books include:

- Les émigrés français aux Pays-Bas (1789-1794) (Brussels, Hayez, 1907)
