= Freemasonry in Belgium =

Freemasonry in Belgium comprises several Masonic obediences, a federation and a confederation. These include Grand Orient of Belgium, the Grand Lodge of Belgium, the Regular Grand Lodge of Belgium, the Women's Grand Lodge of Belgium, the Belgian Federation of Le Droit Humain and Lithos Confederation of Lodges.

== History ==
Freemasonry began in Belgium whilst the region was ruled by Austria, and later came under influence from Freemasonry in France (following the area's annexation) and the Netherlands (in the period between 1815 and 1830). When the state of Belgium was formed in 1830, Freemasonry there expanded greatly, but faced dramatic changes and challenges over the course of the 19th and 20th centuries.

== Today ==
=== Grand Orient of Belgium ===
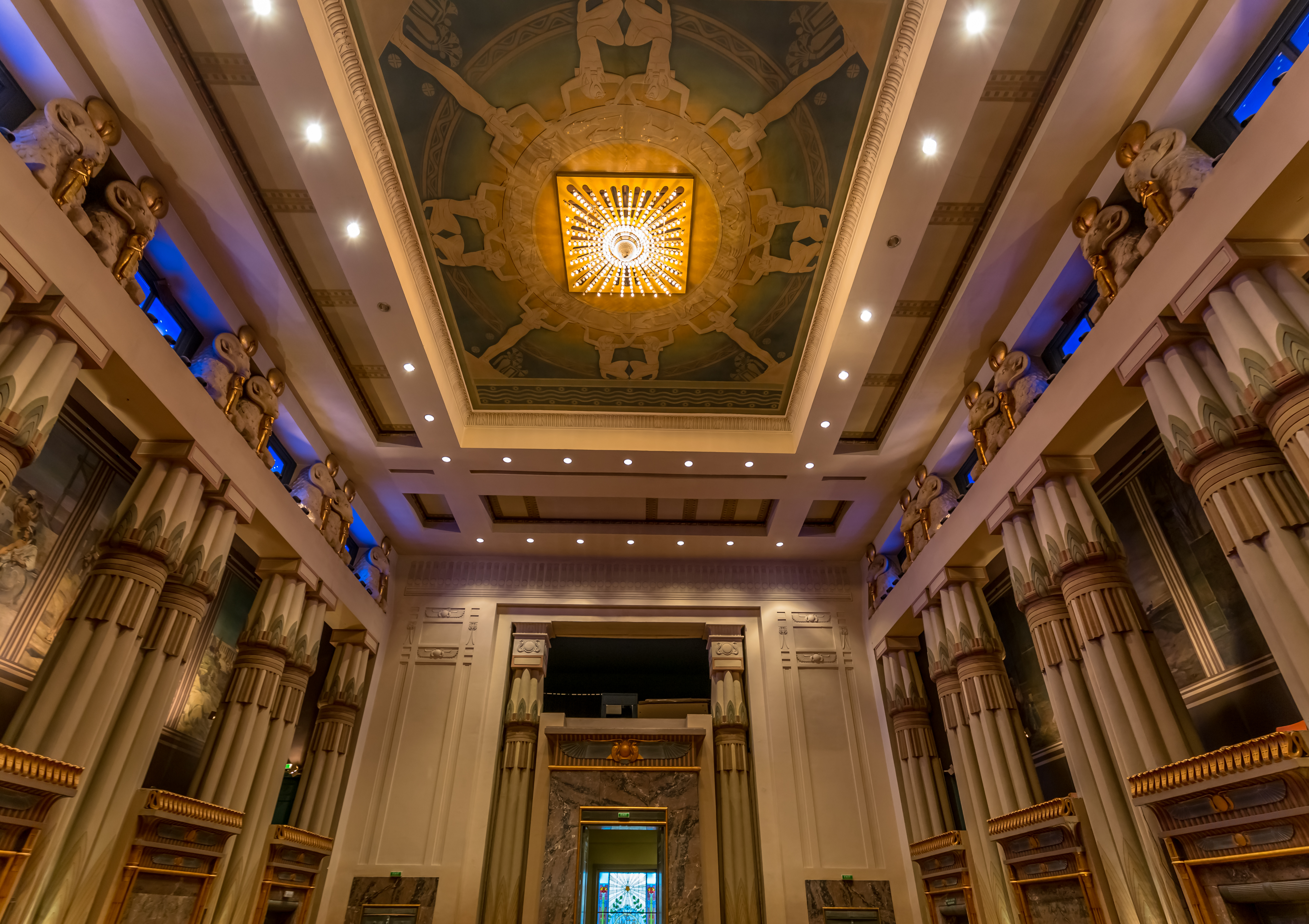
View of the Egyptianate-style main hall of the Grand Orient of Belgium in Brussels

The Grand Orient of Belgium (French: Grand Orient de Belgique, Dutch: Grootoosten van België G.O.B.) is for men only and works in the first three degrees of Freemasonry.

It was founded in 1833, three years after the independence of Belgium, and joined the Grand Orient of France and other Continental jurisdictions in not requiring initiates to believe in a Supreme Being.

In 1989 the Grand Orient of Belgium, the Grand Lodge of Belgium, the Women's Grand Lodge Of Belgium and the Belgian Federation of Le Droit Humain signed an agreement of mutual recognition.

=== Grand Lodge of Belgium ===
The Grand Lodge of Belgium (French: Grande Loge de Belgique, Dutch: Grootloge van België, G.L.B.) is for men only, and works in the first three degrees of Freemasonry. It was founded in 1959 by 5 lodges of the Grand Orient of Belgium in order to regain recognition by the United Grand Lodge of England. When in 1979 this recognition was lost again, 9 lodges founded the Regular Grand Lodge of Belgium. In 1989, the Grand Orient of Belgium, the Grand Lodge of Belgium, the Women's Grand Lodge Of Belgium and the Belgian Federation of Le Droit Humain signed an agreement of mutual recognition.

=== Regular Grand Lodge of Belgium ===
The Regular Grand Lodge of Belgium (French: La Grande Loge Régulière de Belgique, Dutch: Reguliere Grootloge van België, R.G.L.B.) is for men only and works in the first three degrees of Freemasonry. It was founded on 15 June 1979 by 9 lodges after the Grand Lodge of Belgium lost its recognition from the United Grand Lodge of England. Today it has nearly 57 lodges throughout Belgium.

=== Belgian Federation of Le Droit Humain ===
The Belgian Federation of Le Droit Humain (French: Fédération belge du Droit Humain, Dutch: Belgische Federatie Le Droit Humain) with more than 7,800 members working in 112 French-speaking, Dutch-speaking or bilingual Lodges.

=== Women's Grand Lodge of Belgium ===
The Women's Grand Lodge Of Belgium (French: Grande Loge Féminine de Belgique, Dutch: Vrouwengrootloge van België) is a Masonic obedience for women only which works in the first three degrees of Freemasonry. The Grande Loge Féminine de France founded its first lodge in Brussels on 20 April 1974, followed by three more in Liège, Brussels and Charleroi. The Women's Grand Lodge Of Belgium was founded on 17 October 1981.

== Other Masonic rites ==
Various iterations of the Scottish Rite exist in Belgium. The oldest is the Ancient and Accepted Scottish Rite under the leadership of the "Supreme Council of Belgium". Another is the Souverain Collège du Rite écossais pour la Belgique, founded in 1962.

== See also ==
- Co-Freemasonry
- International Secretariat of the Masonic Adogmatic Powers
- Regular Masonic jurisdictions
- Le Droit Humain
