= Grand Orient of Belgium =

Group of Masonic lodges in Belgium

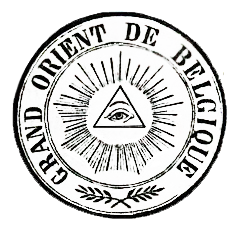
Seal of the Grand Orient of Belgium

The Grand Orient of Belgium (French: Grand Orient de Belgique, Dutch: Grootoosten van Belgie; or G.O.B.) is a Belgian cupola of masonic lodges which is only accessible for men, and works in the basic three symbolic degrees of freemasonry.

== History ==
The Grand Orient of Belgium was founded in 1833, three years after the independence of Belgium. The Grand Orient joins the Grand Orient of France and other Continental jurisdictions in not requiring initiates to believe in a Supreme Being (Great Architect of the Universe). This meant that in the 1870s the Orient broke with the United Grand Lodge of England.

In 1921, the Grand Orient of Belgium was a founding and influential member within the International Masonic Association. It remained a member of this international alliance until 1950. During World War II, members of the Grand Orient of Belgium founded the Lodge Liberté chérie in a Nazi concentration camp and the Lodge l'Obstinée in a Nazi prisoner-of-war camp.

In 1959 five lodges of the Grand Orient of Belgium founded the Grand Lodge of Belgium in order to regain recognition by the United Grand Lodge of England which was lost in 1979. The Grand Orient of Belgium became a founding member of the Centre de Liaison et d'Information des Puissances maçonniques Signataires de l'Appel de Strasbourg (CLIPSAS) in 1961, but left in 1996 with the Grand Orient of France over disputes about the place of religious belief. In 1989 the Grand Orient of Belgium, the Grand Lodge of Belgium, the Women's Grand Lodge Of Belgium and the Belgian Federation of Le Droit Humain signed an agreement of mutual recognition. In 1998, these anti-clerical and atheistic Grand Orients founded the International Secretariat of the Masonic Adogmatic Powers (SIMPA), but by 2008, the Belgium Grand Orient had rejoined CLIPSAS.

== Grand Masters ==
- 1833 - 1835 : Joseph-Marie de Frenne
- 1835 - 1842 : Goswin de Stassart
- 1842 - 1854 : Eugène Defacqz
- 1854 - 1862 : Théodore Verhaegen
- 1866 - 1868 : Joseph Van Schoor
- 1869 - 1871 : Pierre Van Humbeek
- 1871 - 1874 : Auguste Couvreur
- 1875 - 1877 : Henri Bergé
- 1877 - 1880 : Auguste Couvreur
- 1881 - 1883 : Henri Bergé
- 1896 - 1898 : Henri Bergé
- 1884 - 1886 : Eugène Goblet d'Alviella
- 1887 - 1889 : Victor Lynen
- 1890 - 1892 : Ernest Reisse
- 1893 - 1895 : Auguste Houzeau de Lehaie
- 1899 - 1901 : Gustave Royers
- 1902 - 1904 : Fernand Cocq
- 1905 - 1907 : Jean-Laurent Hasse
- 1908 - 1910 : Joseph Descamps
- 1911 - 1913 : Fernand Cocq
- 1914 - 1921 : Charles Magnette
- 1922 - 1924 : Fernand Levêque
- 1925 - 1927 : Charles Magnette
- 1928 - 1930 : Raoul Engel
- 1931 - 1933 : Victor Carpentier
- 1934 - 1936 : Paul Erculisse
- 1936 - 1944 : François Bovesse
- 1944 - 1944 : Jules Hiernaux
- 1945 - 1947 : Leonce Mardens
- 1947 - 1950 : Edmond Troch
- 1950 - 1953 : Walther Bourgeois
- 1954 - 1957 : Robert Hamaide
- 1957 - 1959 : Leopold Remouchamps
- 1960 - 1961 : Georges Beernaerts
- 1962 - 1962 : Charles Castel
- 1963 - 1965 : Henri Bonet
- 1966 - 1968 : Robert Dille
- 1969 - 1971 : Victor-Gaston Martiny
- 1971 - 1974 : Pierre Burton
- 1974 - 1977 : Jaak Nutkievitz
- 1977 - 1981 : Nicolas Bontyès
- 1981 - 1984 : André-Louis Mechelynck
- 1984 - 1987 : Sylvain Loccufier
- 1987 - 1990 : Guy Vlaeminck
- 1990 - 1993 : Louis Dengis
- 1993 - 1996 : Dimitri Sfingopoulos
- 1996 - 1999 : Pierre Klees
- 1999 - 2001 : Adolphe Adolphy
- 2005 - 2008 : Henri Bartholomeeusen
- 2008 - 2011 : Bertrand Fondu
- 2011 - 2014 : Jozef Asselbergh
- 2014 - 2017 : Marc Menschaert
- 2017 - 2020 : Henry Charpentier
- 2020 - 2023 : Alain Cornet
- 2024 - 2027 : Patrick Cauwert

== Notable members ==
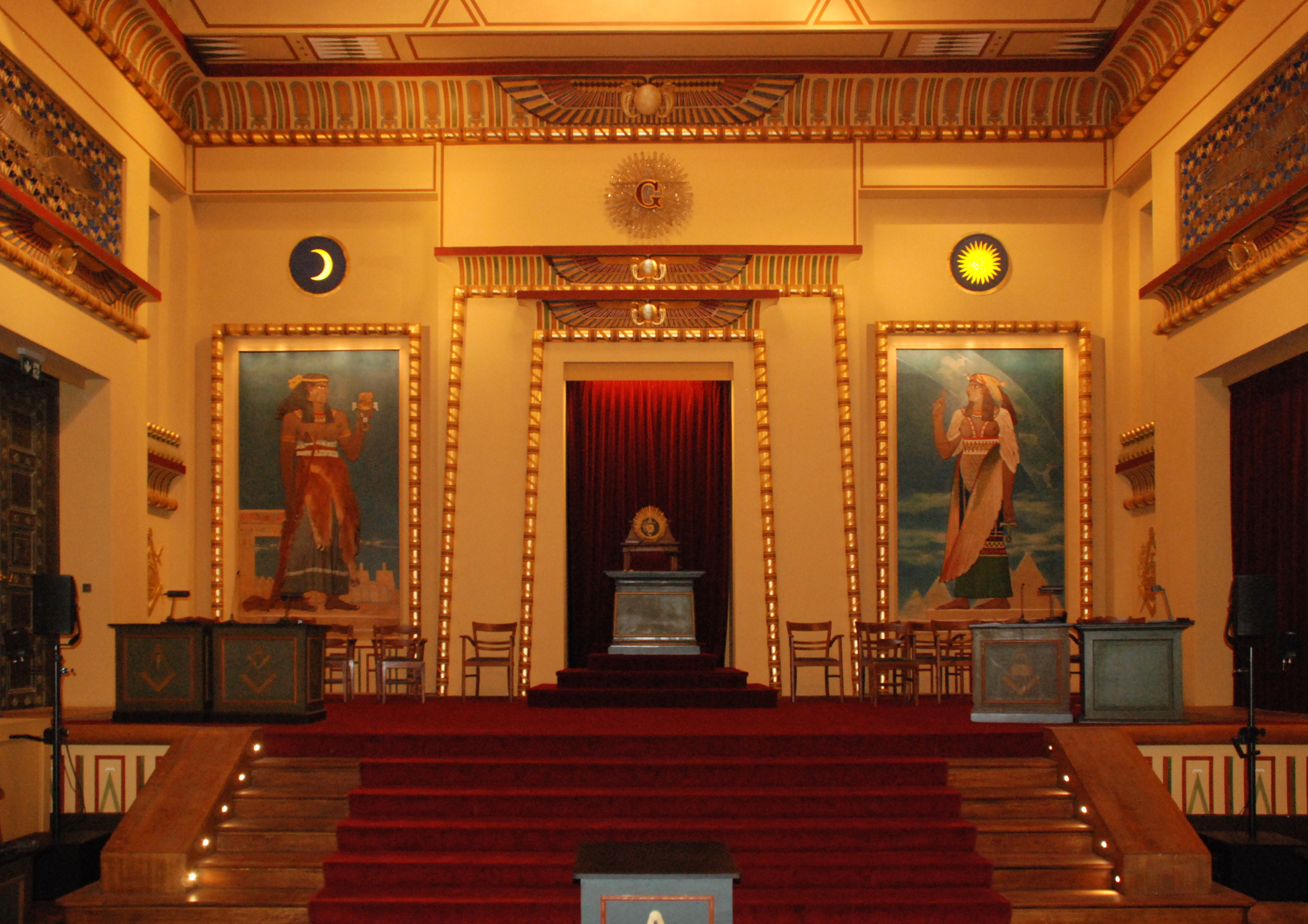
Interior of the Les Amis Philanthropes temple in Brussels

- Jules Anspach, 1829–1879.
- Jules Bordet, 1870–1961, Nobel Prize in Physiology or Medicine (1919)
- François Bovesse, 1890–1944.
- Léo Campion, 1905–1992.
- Charles De Coster, 1827–1879.
- Ovide Decroly, 1871–1932.
- Eugène Goblet d'Alviella, 1846–1925.
- Victor Horta, 1861–1947.
- Paul Hymans, 1865–1941, first President of the League of Nations
- Henri La Fontaine, 1854–1943, Nobel Peace Prize (1913)
- Charles-Joseph de Ligne, 1735–1814.
- Charles Magnette, 1863–1937.
- Constantin Meunier, 1831–1905.
- Edmond Picard, 1836–1924.
- Jean Rey, 1902–1983, second President of the European Commission
- Félicien Rops, 1833–1898.
- Goswin de Stassart, 1780–1854, First Grand Master 1833–1841, styled himself only Grand Senior Warden and Acting Grandmaster in the hope that King Leopold I would accept a nominal title of Grandmaster. (He didn't.)
- Emile Vandervelde, 1866–1938.
- Théodore Verhaegen, 1796–1862, Grand Master 1854 - 1862, founder of the Université libre de Bruxelles
- Henri Vieuxtemps, 1820–1881.

== Relationship with the Roman Catholic Church ==
The GOB has often had a difficult relationship with the Roman Catholic Church (see Catholicism and Freemasonry). The Grand Orient was seen as the main source of anticlericalism during the end of the 19th century and the beginning of the 20th century.

== See also ==
- Freemasonry in Belgium
- History of Freemasonry in Belgium
- International Secretariat of the Masonic Adogmatic Powers
- Regular Grand Lodge of Belgium
