= Charles Magnette =

Belgian lawyer and politician

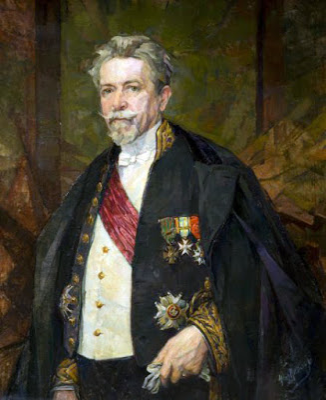
- Charles Magnette by Marguerite Radoux

President of the Senate
- In office 13 November 1928 – 27 December 1932
- Preceded by: Arnold t'Kint de Roodenbeke
- Succeeded by: Emile Digneffe

Personal details
- Born: 3 February 1863 Virton
- Died: 18 October 1937 (aged 74) Liège
- Political party: Liberal Party
- Relatives: Félix Magnette (brother)

Charles Magnette (French: [maɲɛt]; 3 February 1863 – 18 October 1937) was a Belgian lawyer and a liberal politician.

He was President of the Belgian Senate from 1928 until 1932 and Minister of State. He was Grand Master of the Grand Orient of Belgium two times (from 1914 to 1921 and from 1925 to 1927). Magnette was the founder of the International Masonic Association in 1921.

In 1914 and 1916 he appealed to the German Grand Lodges, complaining about the atrocities which were committed by the Germans, who occupied most part of Belgium during World War I, and the deportation of workers. As a result, he served a prison sentence. A street in Liège is named after him.

His brother was the historian Félix Magnette.

== Sources ==
- Charles Magnette

Political offices
Preceded by Arnold t'Kint de Roodenbeke	President of the Senate; 1928–1932	Succeeded by Emile Digneffe
Masonic offices
Preceded by Fernand Cocq	Grand Master of the Grand Orient of Belgium; 1914–1921	Succeeded by Fernand Levêque
Preceded by Fernand Levêque	Grand Master of the Grand Orient of Belgium; 1925–1927	Succeeded by Raoul Engel
