= International Secretariat of the Masonic Adogmatic Powers =

The International Secretariat of the Masonic Adogmatic Powers (ISMAP) (French: Secrétariat international Maçonnique des Puissances Adogmatiques (SIMPA)) was an international organization of Masonic jurisdictions of masonic lodges. Its members merged back into CLIPSAS in the early 2010s.

== History ==
The organization was founded on December 26, 1998 in Brussels, Belgium. The organization was founded after the Grand Orient de France and the Grand Orient of Belgium left CLIPSAS.

== Membership ==
SIMPA members as of 2000: Europe & Asia (17):

- International Masonic Order DELPHI
- Grand Orient de Belgique
- Grande Loge de Belgique
- Grande Loge Féminine de Belgique
- Grand Orient de France
- Grande Loge de Memphis-Misraïm (France)
- Grande Loge Féminine de Memphis-Misraïm (France)
- Grande Loge Mixte Universelle (France)
- Fédération française du Droit Humain (France)
- Sérénissime Grand Orient de Grèce
- Grand Orient de Hongrie
- Gran Loggia d’Italia ALAM
- Grand Orient de Luxembourg
- Grand Orient de Pologne (Poland)
- Gran Logia Simbolica Española
- Grand Orient de Suisse
- Grande Loge Féminine de Suisse
- Grande Loge Maçonnique de Turquie

Americas:

- George Washington Union (USA)
- Supreme Council of Ancient Kemetic Moorish Rite (USA & Morocco)
- Grande Loja Unida de São Paulo (Brazil)
- Grande Oriente de Santa Catarina (Brazil)

== See also ==
- Grande Loge Nationale Française
- International Masonic Union Catena
