= Freemasonry in Latin America =

Freemasonry shaped Latin American history

Latin America

Freemasonry in Latin America has a prominent presence, with many Masonic lodges and members across the region. In terms of membership, it is the most densely populated geographical area after the United States. It manifests in many different forms, and as of 2017, its overall history remains to be fully established. Nevertheless, Freemasonry is frequently referenced in the historical accounts of these countries, particularly concerning the considerable number of Freemasons who played a role in the independence movements against Spain and Portugal.

== Historical overview ==
Latin America and the Caribbean represent the second-largest Masonic center in the world after the United States, significantly surpassing Europe. Its establishment mirrors its presence in Europe during the 18th and early 19th centuries. Throughout its history, Masonry has been persecuted in much the same way by Inquisition tribunals and other prohibitions. (Note: Collectif 2017, p. 87, Rubén Mohedano-Brèthes)

Latin American Freemasonry has impacted the former Spanish and Portuguese colonies. Masonic lodges played a pivotal role in several pivotal historical moments in the region, particularly during the countries' struggles for independence. It incorporated external influences, ultimately forming a distinctive local synthesis. The liberal and politically oriented Freemasonry, influenced by France's Grand Orient de France, became the dominant model, leaving a lasting imprint on South American lodges. (Note: Collectif 2017, p. 17, Pierre Mollier) A review of historical documentation from 2018 reveals that, despite variations in form and structure, Masonic lodges and their members were frequently involved in the political histories of Latin American countries. The liberal model of Freemasonry experienced a decline in the early 20th century due to the impact of World War I and the growing influence of the United States, which prompted many obediences to gravitate towards what is known as "regular Freemasonry." Some countries, such as Brazil, Argentina, and Chile, historically aligned themselves with Anglo-Saxon Masonic practices. (Note: Collectif 2017, p. 223, Yván Herrera Michel)

== Mexico ==
Mexico achieved independence from the Kingdom of Spain following the conclusion of the Mexican War of Independence (1810–1821). The oldest attested lodge in Mexico was established in Mexico City in 1806. The country's inaugural Grand Lodge was established in 1813, followed by the establishing of another Grand Lodge, Gran Logia Mexicana, in 1824, influenced by American Freemasonry. Subsequently, Mexican Freemasonry included numerous presidents of the Republic, such as Benito Juárez, and advocated for secular education, public freedoms, and aid for impoverished peasants from a political perspective.

== Central America ==
Freemasonry became firmly established in Central America in the latter half of the nineteenth century, with the first Masonic lodge being established in San José, Costa Rica, on 28 June 1865. As of 2017, there is no comprehensive historical study of Freemasonry in Central America, except for research conducted on individual countries within the region. Most studies concentrate on the cases of Costa Rica and El Salvador, while those of Nicaragua, Guatemala, and Honduras remain comparatively under-researched. (Note: Collectif 2017, p. 88, Rubén Mohedano-Brèthes) These studies posit that Freemasonry constituted a pivotal force in the modernization and secularization of Central American societies. It facilitated the introduction of progressive European ideas to the region and enabled civil and social reforms, at times even preceding their implementation in Europe. (Note: Collectif 2017, p. 111, Rubén Mohedano-Brèthes)

Despite a decline in the mid-20th century, Freemasonry in Central America has experienced a loss of influence in the 21st century. Membership in each Central American country is now limited to a few hundred individuals. It appears that the regional founder Francisco Calvo's ideal of a "Central American Union" spearheaded by Freemasonry has been temporarily abandoned. (Note: Collectif 2017, p. 112, Rubén Mohedano-Brèthes)

=== Costa Rica ===
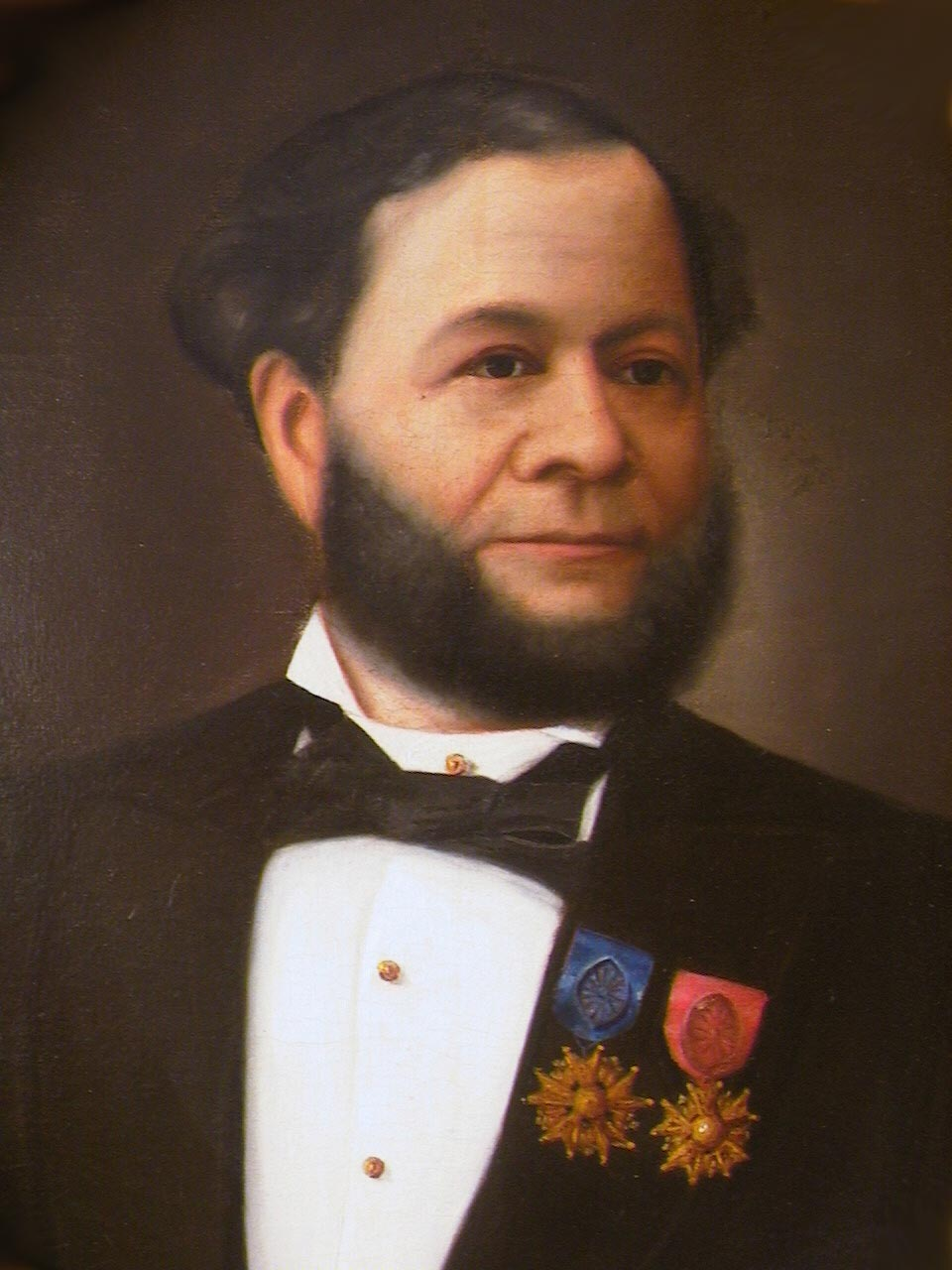
José María Castro Madriz

The history of Freemasonry in Costa Rica commenced with the establishment of the lodge Charité (Caridad) No. 26, founded by the priest Francisco Calvo, who had undergone initiation in the Peruvian lodge Concorde Universelle. In June 1865, Calvo assumed the role of Worshipful Master for the newly established lodge. The lodge was officially constituted on 28 June 1865, with a charter from the Grand Orient and Supreme Neo-Cartaginian Council of Cartagena, Colombia. This Masonic obedience was founded in 1833 and recognized by the Grand Orient de France in 1851. The lodge's founders included doctors, merchants, and clergy—foreigners to Costa Rica who had been initiated in lodges abroad. (Note: Collectif 2017, p. 93, Rubén Mohedano-Brèthes)

The lodge played a pivotal role in the initiation of several prominent Costa Rican political and economic figures, including President José María Castro Madriz, Foreign Minister Julián Volio, and the governor of San José, José Antonio Pinto. Nevertheless, this activism prompted a response from Bishop Llorente, who issued a cautionary statement in 1866 against Freemasonry as a potential societal threat, reiterating the Catholic Church's prohibitions. While President José María Castro Madriz intervened to defuse the situation, the Church and the Catholic press persisted in denouncing Freemasonry, liberalism, and Protestantism as dangerous sects.

Notwithstanding the aforementioned opposition, Costa Rican Freemasonry continued to grow at a steady pace. On 1 April 1868, the first chapter, Avenir du Costa Rica, was established, and additional lodges were founded, including Union Fraternelle (1867), Espoir et Foi (1870), and Fleur du Pacifique. On 9 January 1871, the Grand Orient and Supreme Central American Council was established with Francisco Calvo as its Sovereign Commander. Existing lodges recognized its authority, and the new obedience, based in Guatemala, issued charters for additional lodges. (Note: Collectif 2017, p. 95, Rubén Mohedano-Brèthes)

The Grand Lodge of Costa Rica was established on 7 December 1899. In 1919, José Basile Acuña Zeledón established the inaugural mixed-gender lodge in Costa Rica, Saint-Germain No. 621, operating under the Le Droit Humain tradition. From 1865 to 1899, numerous prominent figures were initiated into Freemasonry. Indeed, nearly half of the country's leading officials were lodge members between 1865 and 1870. However, between 1873 and 1899, Freemasonry's influence declined. Nevertheless, many secular, liberal, and republican reforms that shaped modern Costa Rica are attributed to the Freemasons of that era.

=== El Salvador ===
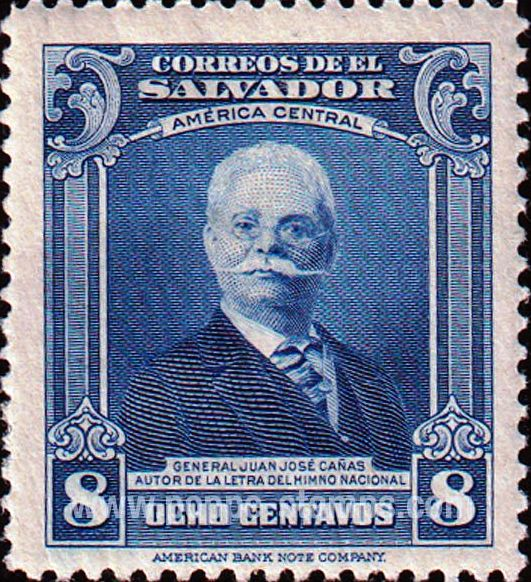
Juan José Cañas

After establishing the Grand Orient and Supreme Central American Council in January 1871, the nascent obedience witnessed an expansion to neighboring countries, commencing with El Salvador. The inaugural lodge in El Salvador, Le Progres No. 5, commenced operations in San Salvador on 30 September 1871. This lodge recruited members from the country's political and social elite, including Vice President Manuel Méndez, writer Juan José Cañas, and San Salvador Governor José Larreynaga. Additionally, it attracted foreign figures such as Frenchman Auguste Bouineau, a representative of the Compagnie Générale Transatlantique, and Juan Luis Buerón, director of the railroads. (Note: Collectif 2017, pp. 98–99, Rubén Mohedano-Brèthes)

Similarly to its stance in Costa Rica, the Catholic Church in El Salvador issued a vehement condemnation of the establishment of a Masonic lodge and Freemasonry within the country. In a pastoral letter issued by Bishop Tomás Pineda y Zaldana of San Salvador, the Church declared excommunication for Freemasons, giving them twelve days to recant. The Church continued its anti-Masonic campaign until 6 June 1872, when the Jesuits were expelled from the country, followed by numerous other clergy members. The Catholic newspaper La Verdad was banned as the nation embarked on a process of secularization and modernization under President Santiago González, who was supported and accompanied by many Freemasons. (Note: Collectif 2017, pp. 99–100, Rubén Mohedano-Brèthes)

From that point onward, Freemasonry exerted a growing influence in the formation of a liberal state, particularly during the presidencies of Rafael Zaldívar, who was himself a Freemason, and Francisco Menéndez. From 1882 onwards, many new lodges were established, including Excelsior, Charité et Constance, Force et Matière, Osiris, Rafael Osoria, and several others. Salvadoran lodges served as venues for interaction and socialization among locals and foreigners, frequently functioning as incubators for democratic and social ideologies. (Note: Collectif 2017, p. 100, Rubén Mohedano-Brèthes)

In September 1912, Salvadoran Freemasonry achieved autonomy from the Central American Grand Orient and Supreme Council by establishing the Grand Lodge Cuscatlán of El Salvador. In 2007, two dissident lodges merged to form the Grand Orient of El Salvador, which initiated the establishment of the first female lodge in El Salvador and Central America.

=== Nicaragua and Guatemala ===
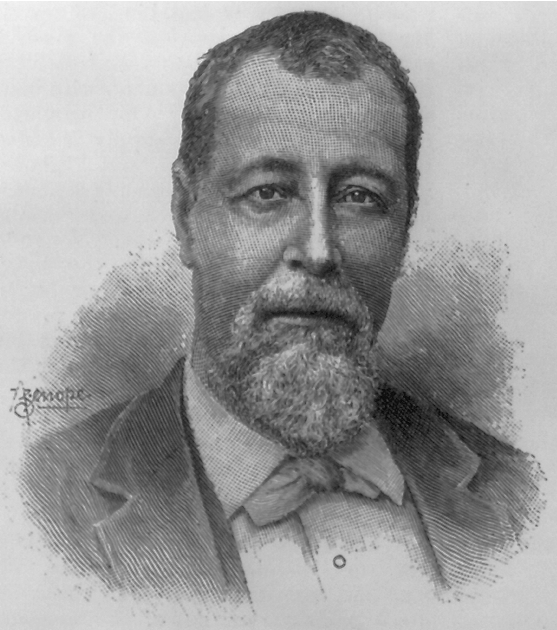
Justo Rufino Barrios

In 1763, a Masonic lodge was documented on the Atlantic coast of Nicaragua, and another was established in 1851 in Greytown (Saint John Lodge, affiliated with the Grand Lodge of Scotland). Nevertheless, the first lodge with verifiable documentation was established on 28 October 1882, in Granada. The lodge was named Progres No. 41 and was established by José Théophile Léonard, a free-thinking Franco-Polish professor who had been initiated into Freemasonry in Spain in 1864 at the Fraternité No. 42 lodge. (Note: Collectif 2017, p. 101, Rubén Mohedano-Brèthes) In response to the advent of Freemasonry in the country, conservative elites secured Léonard's expulsion, compelling him to seek refuge in El Salvador. In 1908, he observed the initiation of the poet Rubén Darío into Progrès No. 41. (Note: Collectif 2017, p. 103, Rubén Mohedano-Brèthes) Nicaraguan Freemasonry achieved autonomy from the Central American Grand Orient in 1907, with three lodges establishing the Grand Symbolic Lodge of Nicaragua. By 2017, Nicaragua had approximately 500 Freemasons.

The absence of comprehensive historical studies on Freemasonry in Guatemala precludes a detailed account of its presence in the country. The Grand Lodge of Guatemala, established in 1903, remained active as of 2017. Approximately 500 Freemasons were distributed among thirty lodges. Historiographically, Guatemalan Freemasonry has included five presidents: Justo Rufino Barrios, José María Reina Barrios, Lázaro Chacón González, Carlos Manuel Arana Osorio, and Ramiro de León Carpio.

=== Honduras and Panama ===
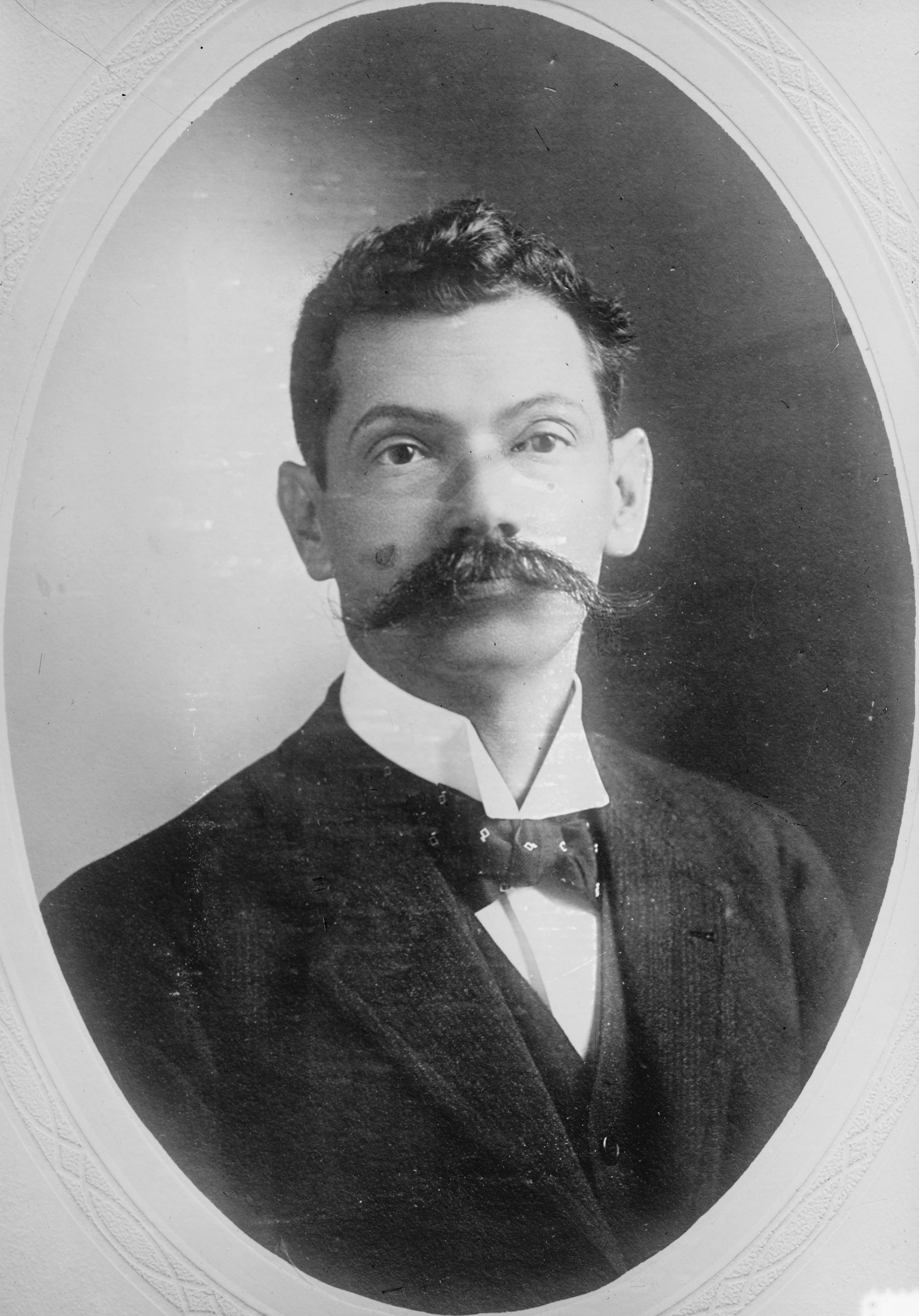
Francisco Bertrand

In Honduras, the first documented instance of Freemasonry occurred at the end of the 19th century with the establishment of the Morazán No. 14 lodge in Tegucigalpa in 1898. This lodge was created under the guidance of the Central American Grand Orient. The lodge was reactivated in 1897 when it elected Terencio Sierra as its second Worshipful Master General. It developed rapidly but ceased operations in 1906 due to the unrest of 1903 and the 1907 war. Subsequently, Freemasonry was re-established with the formation of Equality No. 1, which succeeded Morazán No. 14 and included President Francisco Bertrand Barahona among its members. (Note: Collectif 2017, p. 104, Rubén Mohedano-Brèthes) In 1922, the Grand Symbolic Lodge of Honduras was established, with historical lodges asserting their autonomy from the Central American Grand Orient. By 2017, Honduras had approximately a dozen active lodges with limited members, and Freemasonry had lost its significant influence on Honduran society. (Note: Collectif 2017, p. 105, Rubén Mohedano-Brèthes)

The geopolitical situation of Panama directly impacted the development of Freemasonry within the country. In 1821, a short-lived lodge was established by Freemasons from the Grand Orient of Spain. By the time the United States assumed responsibility for constructing the canal in 1903, only two lodges (established in 1854 and 1884) remained under Colombian jurisdiction. In 1906, American Freemasons established lodges under the Grand Lodge of Massachusetts. By 1913, seven Panamanian lodges had founded the Grand Lodge of Panama, which was swiftly granted recognition by the Grand Lodge of Massachusetts. By 2017, Panama had seven lodges, operating in Spanish and English, primarily using the Ancient and Accepted Scottish Rite. (Note: Collectif 2017, p. 106, Rubén Mohedano-Brèthes)

== South America ==
=== Río de la Plata Basin ===
==== Argentina ====
In 2017, historian and academic Devrig Mollès (Note: The author is a historian, the scientific director of the archives of the Grand Lodge of Argentina, and a member of the scientific council of the journal for studies and history of Latin American Freemasonry. (Note: Collectif 2017, p. 359, Alain de Keghel)) assessed the state of historiographical documentation on Freemasonry in Argentina. The assessment concluded that the field was "ostracized" due to the underdevelopment of scientific records. The extant historiography is primarily concerned with biographies of national political figures with connections to Freemasonry. (Note: Collectif 2017, p. 359, Dévrig Mollès) The country's extensive geography and the looting of archives during the 20th century present additional challenges to the establishment of a comprehensive history of Freemasonry in Argentina, beyond its major milestones. (Note: Collectif 2017, p. 360, Dévrig Mollès)

===== First generation =====
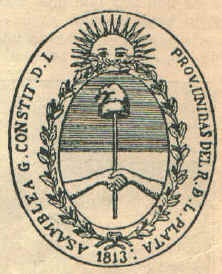
Coat of arms of the United Provinces of Río de la Plata in 1813

The inaugural generation of Freemasons, discernible by using limited-quality sources, emerged during the Atlantic Revolutions and independence wars of the early 19th century. (Note: Collectif 2017, p. 362, Dévrig Mollès) Initially, the organization was concentrated in the Southern Cone, centered on Buenos Aires and Montevideo—two Atlantic ports—between 1795 and 1815. Thereafter, it spread westward. (Note: Collectif 2017, p. 363, Dévrig Mollès) The lodges included a diverse array of social groups with both common and conflicting interests. The membership of the lodges included Creole and Portuguese merchants, high-ranking Spanish officials, British officers, American agents, French officers exiled after Waterloo, and representatives of various states and empires seeking influence in Latin America. Additionally, the lodges attracted young Hispanic-American nationalists, some of whom had founded anti-colonial secret societies in Spain. Among them was the Lautaro Lodge, established in 1812, whose members explicitly pursued revolutionary goals. (Note: Collectif 2017, p. 364, Dévrig Mollès)

The Lautaro Lodge underwent two distinct phases. From 1812 to 1815, the members of the Lautaro Lodge exercised control over the Buenos Aires government, initiated hostilities against Spain, and played a pivotal role in the 1813 Constituent Assembly of the United Provinces of the Río de la Plata. Following 1815, the Lodge's decline was precipitated by internal divisions. By 1830, the lodge and its cohort of Freemasons had vanished, dispersed by the ravages of war and the dictatorships that followed, leaving no networks or practices behind. (Note: Collectif 2017, pp. 364–365, Dévrig Mollès) This disappearance can be attributed to the fact that their foundational structure functioned less as a cultural or social movement and more as a political and ideological organization inspired by the Masonic model spread globally by the French Revolution and the First Empire. However, these lodges were entirely autonomous and independent of foreign Grand Orients or Grand Lodges. They represent the earliest forms of modern political organization in Argentina. (Note: Collectif 2017, p. 365, Dévrig Mollès)

===== Second generation =====
The period between 1830 and 1850 saw the complete disappearance of Masonic life in Argentina as a result of the anti-Masonic and traditionalist dictatorship that was prevalent at the time. Following 1850, a new dynamic emerged amidst the intensified European commercial, cultural, and migratory expansion of the era. (Note: Collectif 2017, p. 366, Dévrig Mollès) Lodges established by exiles, emigrants, and other Latin American Freemasons in Montevideo, Valparaiso, and Buenos Aires—under the patronage of the Grand Orient of France and practicing the French Rite—were instrumental in initiating this revival, disseminating the initial elements of Masonic culture. Subsequently, additional lodges practicing the Emulation Rite were established and grouped under a Provincial Grand Lodge, beginning in 1855. Historians attribute this generation's success to the sociological composition of its members, reflecting the country's political elite. Part of this elite comprised liberal former political exiles, while another segment consisted of more conservative landowners. Collectively, they worked towards national unity, peace, modernization, and Atlantic integration. (Note: Collectif 2017, p. 367, Dévrig Mollès)

From 1852 to 1870, Argentine Freemasonry developed around three rites—French, Scottish, and Emulation—with a few extraterritorial lodges and 42 national lodges organized under two briefly competing jurisdictions. The number of members reached approximately 2,000. Between 1900 and 1914, the movement experienced a period of significant expansion, with membership numbers increasing to between 10,000 and 15,000. Additionally, there was a notable degree of institutional fragmentation, with records indicating the existence of approximately eight national obediences and approximately ten European branches, each comprising several lodges. Argentine Freemasonry's growth trajectory paralleled that of the country's expansion, reaching its zenith in 1914. Members frequently played a role in influencing the nation's structures, drawing recruits from a diverse range of social backgrounds, particularly those associated with modernization and the liberal elite. (Note: Collectif 2017, p. 3671, Dévrig Mollès)

==== Paraguay ====
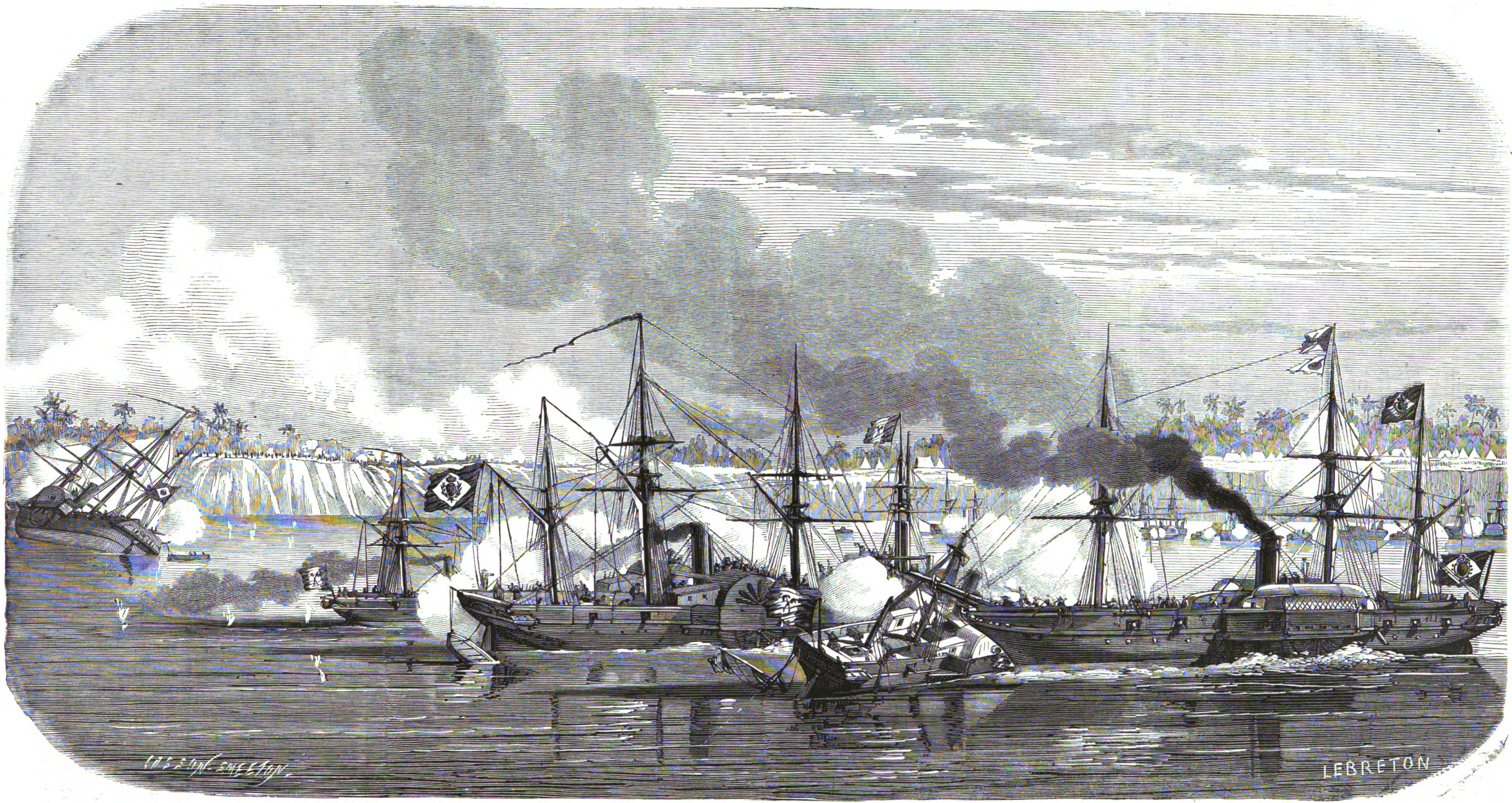
Naval battle of Riachuelo, between the Brazilian and Paraguayan squadrons. From a drawing by M. Félix Vogeli.

The paucity of documentary sources available as of 2017 suggests that Freemasonry was established in Paraguay on 25 June 1869, during the occupation of its capital by the armed forces of the Triple Alliance. This occurred under the aegis of a Supreme Council of Paraguay, whose legitimacy was promptly challenged by the United Grand Lodge of England (UGLE). In the subsequent month, the lodge Fe was established under the aegis of the Grand Orient of Brazil. On 18 September 1869, the lodge Unión Paraguaya was constituted in Asunción with a charter from the Grand Lodge of Argentina. However, it ceased operations in 1873. From the lodge Fe, a capitular lodge emerged, which eventually divided into four lodges. Along with other lodges formed through this expansion, they established the Grand Orient and Supreme Regular Council of the Ancient and Accepted Scottish Rite (AASR). (Note: Collectif 2017, p. 351, Alain de Keghel)

Benedicto Conti, chaplain of the Brazilian fleet stationed in Asunción, played a pivotal role in establishing the foundations of Freemasonry in Paraguay. Conti, a Roman Catholic clergyman and 33rd-degree Grand Inspector of the AASR, made a substantial contribution during this period. However, with the conclusion of the occupation in 1876, all lodges established under Brazilian obedience were suspended, and Masonic activity ceased until June 1887, when the Aurora del Paraguay No. 1 lodge was founded. The founders of this lodge also established two political parties that later became Paraguay's traditional political factions. (Note: Collectif 2017, p. 352, Alain de Keghel)

In the nineteenth century, several obediences were established, including the Grand Symbolic Lodge of Paraguay, which was recognized by the UGLE; the Supreme Council of the 33rd Degree of Paraguay (1895); and the Grand Orient of Paraguay, which ceased notable activities shortly thereafter. A modest Grand Symbolic Lodge of the Grand Orient of Paraguay persists in the practice of Masonry by liberal traditions. The presence of Mixed Freemasonry in Paraguay dates back to January 2002, a consequence of the endeavors of Ramona Jose Bertoni, a political exile initiated in 1964 in Argentina. (Note: Collectif 2017, p. 353, Alain de Keghel)

==== Uruguay ====
Freemasonry first emerged in Uruguay after the 18th century, coinciding with the arrival of the inaugural wave of immigrants in the region, designated as the Banda Oriental, and its capital, Montevideo. This Masonic presence expanded in 1807 during the British invasions of the Río de la Plata, with the establishment of military lodges among Irish Dragoon regiments. The Grand Orient of Uruguay was officially established in 1856 with a charter from the Grand Orient of Brazil.

==== Peru ====
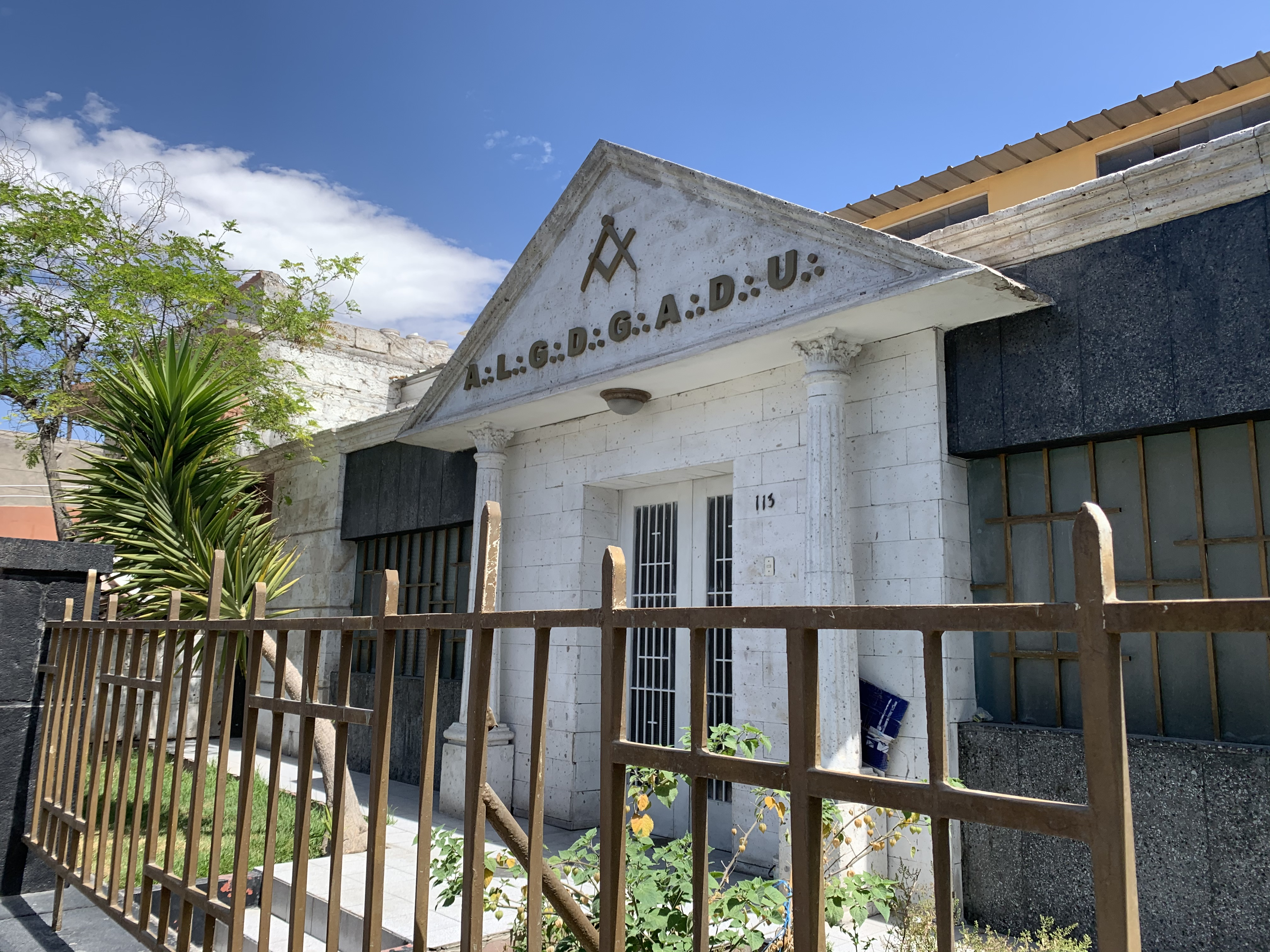
Masonic temple in Arequipa, Peru

The lodge Paz y Perfecta Unión No. 1, established by Antonio Miranda in 1819 and formally recognized in 1821 by José de San Martín upon his arrival in Lima, is regarded as the inaugural Masonic lodge in Peru. During the country's period of independence, additional lodges were established under the Grand National Orient of New Granada. (Note: The term La Nueva Granada refers to the territory that would later become the country of Colombia.) By the early 1830s, Peru had twelve symbolic lodges and six high-grade Masonic chapters. (Note: Collectif 2017, p. 259, Alain Fumaz) The Grand Lodge of Peru was established on 23 June 1831, with Thomas Rypley Elder serving as its inaugural Grand Master. On 11 August 1831, the obedience was renamed the Grand Peruvian Orient. However, the political unrest of 1833 resulted in the closure of the lodges, effectively ending Freemasonry's presence in Peru for 12 years. (Note: Collectif 2017, p. 260, Alain Fumaz)

On 6 November 1844, a group of Freemasons reestablished the lodge Orden y Libertad No. 2 and, in a general assembly, resolved to reorganize Peruvian Freemasonry and the Grand Peruvian Orient under the designation Grand National Orient of Peru. In 1849, a Supreme Council was reestablished, and the York Rite was introduced in 1852. In 1857, three lodges split to form the Grand National Lodge of Peru. However, the Grand National Orient did not recognize this body as regular. (Note: Collectif 2017, p. 261, Alain Fumaz)

==== Bolivia ====
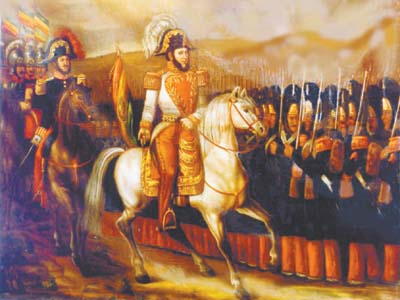
José Ballivián inspecting his troops at the battle of Ingavi

The first lodge of Freemasonry in Bolivia was established in 1820 in La Paz by General José Ballivián and is known as Patriotica. The name of the lodge evoked the patriotic sentiments of its early members. Another lodge, Los Huaskes ("Brothers" in Aymara), was established in Chuquisaca in 1823 with the support of Argentine and Peruvian lodges. Following the Declaration of Independence in 1825, another lodge, named Hiram, was established. However, as of 2017, there is no available documentation on the operations of these lodges or the establishment of others at that time. Bolivia's dire economic situation following the independence wars hindered Freemasonry's growth. Political turmoil from 1848 to 1858 led to the exile of many Freemasons and the closure of the few existing lodges. (Note: Collectif 2017, p. 280, Alain Fumaz)

From 1868 onward, some lodges were established, including Constance and Concord No. 11 and Universal Brotherhood No. 20, which were founded under the auspices of the Grand Orient of Peru. Notable figures such as presidents José Manuel Pando and Adolfo Ballivián were among their members. However, the War of the Pacific in 1879 resulted in the closure of these lodges. In the subsequent years, Masonic activity was renewed, although no national obedience was established. In 1884, the national press published Pope Leo XIII's encyclical, which condemned Freemasonry and threatened severe penalties for members of what he called a "criminal society." Despite anti-Masonic attacks, several lodges were founded at the end of the 19th century. However, Bolivia's prolonged political instability led to repeated closures of Masonic lodges. (Note: Collectif 2017, p. 281, Alain Fumaz)

In the early 20th century, many lodges were established under the auspices of the Grand Lodge of Chile. Such lodges were established to work in the York Rite and the Ancient and Accepted Scottish Rite. However, the prevailing political climate in Bolivia remained inhospitable to Freemasonry, rendering its operation a significant challenge. Notwithstanding these challenges, several lodges, including Honor y Prudencia, Illimani, Hondrez y Trabajo, Tunari, Adolf Ballivián, Mariscal de Ayacucho, and Anglo Bolivian, petitioned the Grand Lodge of Chile for a charter to establish a national Masonic obedience. This request was granted at the General Assembly on 27 May 1929. The Grand Lodge of Bolivia was formally established on 24 June 1931, under the direction of Filiberto Osorio Tellez, following two years of provisional operations overseen by its inaugural Grand Master, Norberto Galdo Ballivián. (Note: Collectif 2017, p. 283, Alain Fumaz) In March 1931, the transmission of higher Masonic degrees commenced under the guidance of the Grand Lodge of Chile. In January 1931, the Supreme Council of Chile announced the establishment of a Supreme Council for the Grand Lodge of Bolivia to the broader South American Masonic community. (Note: Collectif 2017, p. 284, Alain Fumaz)

On 26 April 1967, the Grand Lodge of Bolivia was formally acknowledged as a legal entity by presidential decree from President René Barrientos Ortuño. This recognition facilitated its growth, and by 1990, the organization encompassed 40 lodges with nearly 1,800 members. In the 21st century, Freemasonry in Bolivia continues to be active in all geographic regions of the country. The membership of the lodges is predominantly of Mestizo origin, with a minority of members of European descent. The Grand Lodge of Bolivia adheres to the traditions established by the United Grand Lodge of England. Over time, many schisms have resulted in the formation of additional Masonic obediences. (Note: Collectif 2017, p. 287, Alain Fumaz) In 1994, the Grand Lodge Feminine of Chile supported the establishment of a women's lodge, Antawara No. 7, in Bolivia. The establishment of two additional lodges in 2007 resulted in the formation of the Grand Feminine Lodge of Bolivia, marking the advent of women's Freemasonry in the country despite the pervasiveness of patriarchal traditions in Bolivia. In January 2010, the Grand Lodge was granted legal recognition and became a member of the American Federation of Feminine Freemasonry, established in Chile in 2000 and currently unites eight South American female obediences. (Note: Collectif 2017, pp. 288–289, Alain Fumaz)

=== Chile ===
Outside of the so-called "Lautarine" lodges, (Note: Some lodges with a political orientation claimed inspiration from the spirit of Lautaro, an Amerindian leader. (Note: Collectif 2017, p. 327, Alain Fumaz)) which were created in 1817 in Santiago and which historians often view as political and independence-focused secret societies rather than Masonic lodges, the first official Chilean lodge, Filantropía Chilena, was established in Santiago in 1827. The lodge was consecrated under the Grand Orient of Colombia, which comprised 14 members, and was led by its first Worshipful Master, Manuel Blanco Encalada.

=== Brazil ===
Brazilian Freemasonry is, without question, the largest in South America, having been established by the late 18th century. The Grand Orient of Brazil (GOB) was established in 1822.

Freemasonry was prohibited from 1806 to 1819 by the viceroy, but upon the proclamation of Prince Pedro I as emperor in 1822, the GOB was reinstated. José Bonifácio de Andrada e Silva, known as the "Patriarch of Independence", held the position of Grand Master briefly before relinquishing it to the emperor. However, due to concerns about political activity, Pedro I promptly reinstated the ban on lodges. Upon his abdication in favor of his son in 1831, the GOB was reconstituted and experienced a significant expansion, extending its reach into Uruguay and Paraguay.

A schism in 1926 led to the establishment of autonomous Grand Lodges in each state of the federation.

=== Colombia ===
The history of Freemasonry in Colombia begins in 1808 with the establishment of the lodge Las Tres Virtudes Teologales in Cartagena de Indias. This lodge was chartered by the Provincial Grand Lodge of Jamaica. The history of Colombian Freemasonry has been marked by numerous internal conflicts, (Note: Collectif 2017, p. 227, Yván Herrera Michel) often resulting from the convergence of political activism with Masonic ideals and debates concerning Masonic Regularity under Anglo-Saxon interpretations. Two significant prohibitions were imposed on Colombian Freemasonry. The first, enacted by Simón Bolívar on 8 November 1828, persisted for three years. The second, introduced by President Rafael Núñez in 1887, compelled lodges in the northern regions of the country to continue their activities clandestinely, frequently aligning with the Conservative Party. (Note: Collectif 2017, p. 228, Yván Herrera Michel)

In the early 20th century, new Grand Lodges emerged in Colombia. By the end of the century, the country had approximately 3,000 members, comprising both men and women, across 140 lodges. The majority of these members were from the middle class. The most widely practiced rite is the Ancient and Accepted Scottish Rite. (Note: Collectif 2017, p. 229, Yván Herrera Michel)

=== Ecuador ===
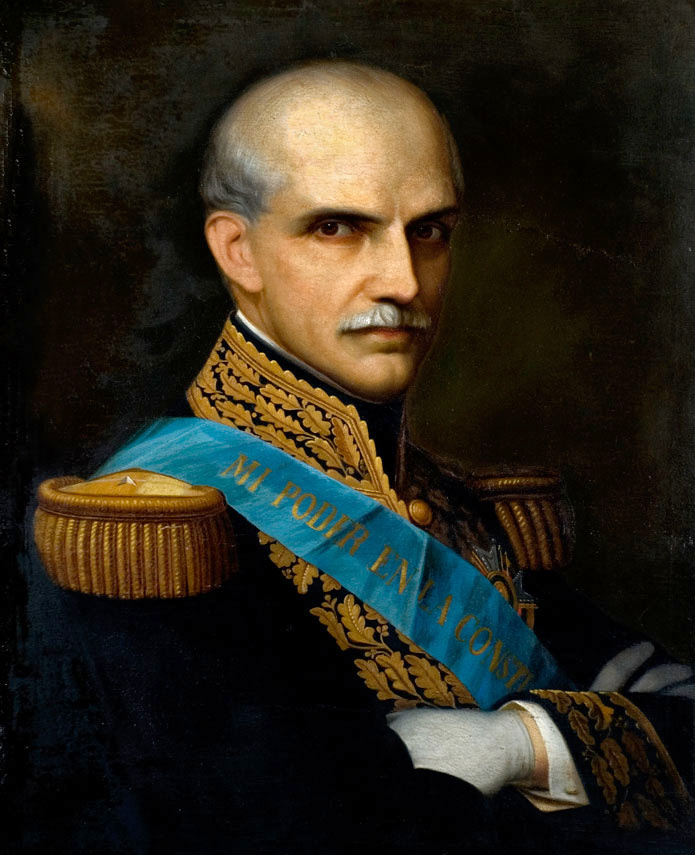
Gabriel García Moreno

Similar to other Latin American countries, Freemasonry in Ecuador has historically encountered opposition from the Catholic Church, which has historically opposed challenges to the established order rooted in the Spanish conquest. In 1869, Freemasonry was banned in Ecuador, and in 1875, it was falsely accused of complicity in the assassination of President Gabriel García Moreno, who had reversed the separation of church and state. (Note: Collectif 2017, p. 244, Federico Morales Correo)

In the present era, the Freemasonry movement in Ecuador is relatively modest in size, with the majority of its members hailing from middle-class urban communities. There is a notable absence of indigenous people in the organization ranks. The most prominent obedience in Ecuador at present is the Grand Equinoctial Lodge of Ecuador, which was established in 1979. The Grand Equinoctial Lodge of Ecuador has several hundred members distributed across 35 lodges, headquartered in Quito. This male-only obedience practices the York Rite and the Ancient and Accepted Scottish Rite (AASR). While aligned with the United Grand Lodge of England, it maintains fraternal relations with French Freemasonry and the Grand Orient of France. (Note: The image of this obedience and the liberal movement are inextricably linked to the history of Bolivarianism and Garibaldianism. (Note: Collectif 2017, p. 245, Federico Morales Correo)) Its temples, like those in the United States, are easily recognizable edifices.

Mixed Freemasonry has been present in Ecuador since 2011, with the establishment of the Grand Mixed Lodge of the Andean Equator, which claims over 200 members, comprising both men and women. The Modern Rite of Ecuador, which is closely related to the French Rite, is practiced by this organization. The Latin American Grand Orient, a mixed obedience created by exiled Chilean Freemasons during Pinochet's dictatorship, is also active in Ecuador. This body is a member of CLIPSAS and practices both the AASR and the French Rite in French. Additionally, several high-degree Masonic jurisdictions operate within the country. (Note: Collectif 2017, p. 246, Federico Morales Correo)

=== Suriname ===
The historiography of Freemasonry in Suriname remains underdeveloped as of 2017. The earliest documented Masonic lodge was Concordia in Paramaribo in 1761, followed by six others with French or Latin names. (Note: Collectif 2017, p. 197, Alain de Keghel) The evolution of these lodges has yet to be the subject of academic study. In the contemporary era, two lodges were established in 1964 and 1970 under the authority of the Provincial Grand Lodge of Suriname, affiliated with the Grand Orient of the Netherlands and aligned with the UGLE tradition. Additionally, the Provincial Grand Lodge encompasses the Institute of Obedience Studies, established in 1917. All three lodges adhere to the Modern French Rite. The total number of male members within Surinamese Freemasonry is less than 100, predominantly comprising white immigrants. (Note: Collectif 2017, p. 198, Alain de Keghel)

The first Surinamese and people of color were initiated into the lodge Concordia, which celebrated its 250th anniversary in November 2011. Notable figures such as Frank Essed and Jules Sedney, whose names are listed on the membership rolls of this bicentennial lodge, facilitated the integration of multiculturalism within the organization. Despite this advancement, local lodges did not witness a substantial increase in membership. Surinamese Freemasonry maintains cordial relations with Protestant clergy, with its interactions with the Catholic Church bearing resemblance to those observed across Latin America. (Note: Collectif 2017, pp. 198–199, Alain de Keghel)

=== Venezuela ===
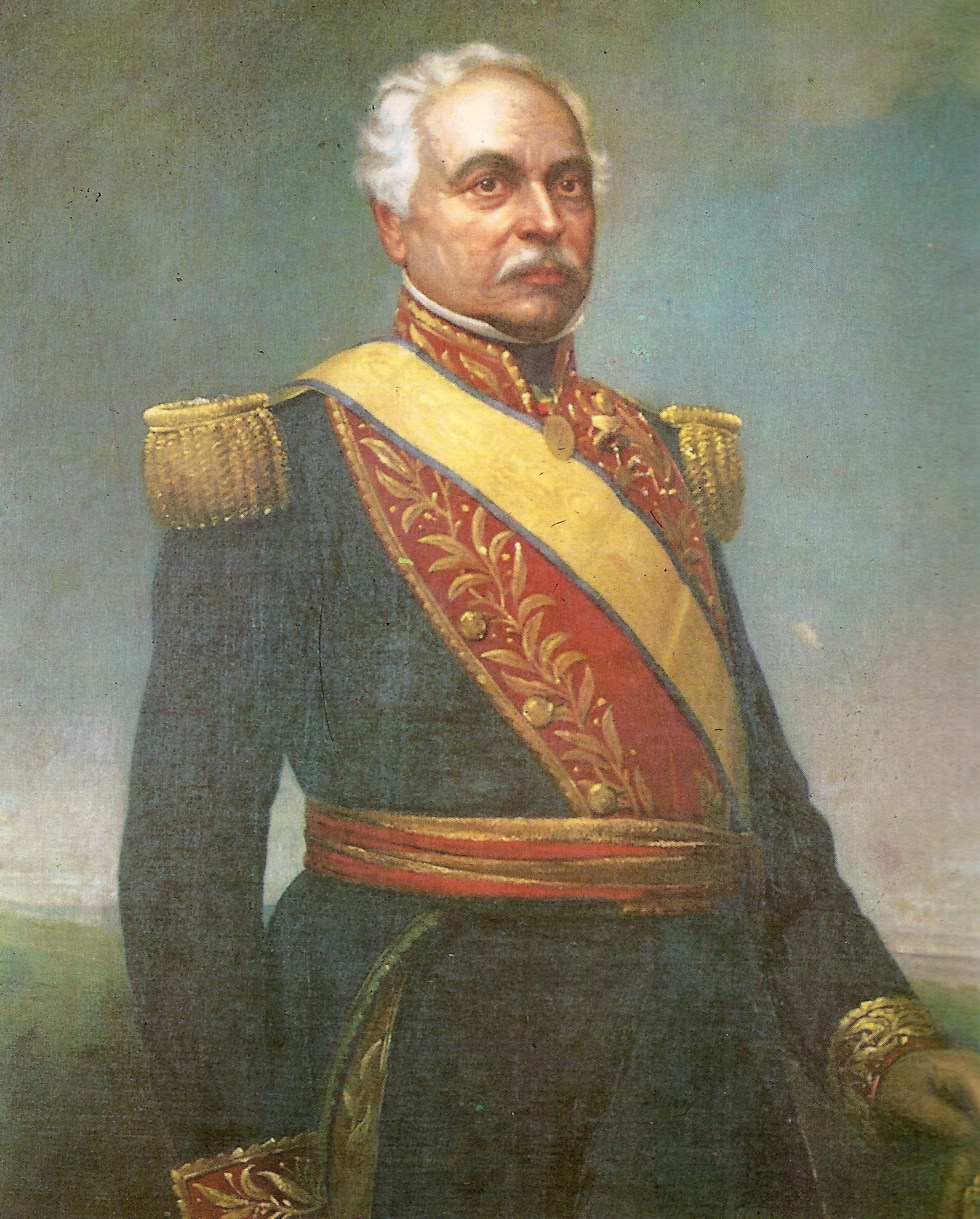
José Antonio Páez

The origins of Freemasonry in Venezuela are believed to have originated in Trinidad. Historian Caracciolo Parra Pérez posits that General Santiago Mariño was initiated in the region and established a lodge in 1808 on Margarita Island, which he titled Saint John of Margarita (San Juan de la Margarita). (Note: Collectif 2017, p. 203, Alain de Keghel) Subsequently, other lodges were established, including Las Tres Virtudes Teogales (The Three Theological Virtues), which was chartered by the Grand Lodge of Jamaica; Perfecta Armonía No. 74 (Perfect Harmony), which was under the jurisdiction of the Grand Lodge of Maryland and ceased activity in 1812. Additionally, there was Protectora de las Virtudes No. 1 (Protector of Virtues No. 1), which practiced the Ancient and Accepted Scottish Rite (AASR) and was founded on 1 July 1812, in Barcelona. (Note: Collectif 2017, p. 204, Alain de Keghel) A common thread among these lodges was their members' active participation in the struggle for independence, often at great personal cost. For example, members of the lodge Patria were executed when Royalist General Francisco Tomás Morales seized Carúpano in late January 1815. (Note: Collectif 2017, p. 205, Alain de Keghel)

==== Expansion and politics ====
Notwithstanding the prevailing War of Independence, Freemasonry experienced growth in Venezuela. General José Antonio Páez, a Freemason and prominent member of the AASR, is credited with reporting the existence of 18 active lodges. As reported by Diego Bautista Urbaneja, these lodges subsequently merged to form the Gran Logia de la Gran Colombia (Grand Lodge of Greater Colombia), officially inaugurated on 24 June 1824. However, the prevailing political unrest and the ongoing war resulted in a cessation of activities until 1832. Many Freemasons perished during the conflict, but Urbaneja, one of the few survivors, was able to reactivate several lodges and initiate new members, including prominent political figures. By 1838, Freemasonry in Venezuela had recovered its pre-war numbers. On 9 September of that year, the Gran Logia de Venezuela (Grand Lodge of Venezuela) was established during a general assembly of delegates. The organization flourished under the protection of Antonio Guzmán Blanco, a Freemason and head of state, who inaugurated the Grand Temple of Caracas on 27 April 1876. (Note: Collectif 2017, p. 208, Alain de Keghel)

Freemasonry impacted on Venezuelan politics and leadership throughout the nineteenth century. A considerable number of political and civil acts were informed by Masonic ideals. During José Antonio Páez's second presidential term, most ministerial positions were occupied by members of the liberal faction of Freemasonry. Freemasons such as Ezequiel Zamora and Juan Crisóstomo Falcón espoused egalitarian principles. Zamora perished during the siege of San Carlos in January 1860, whereas Falcón, who was promoted to Marshal, assumed the presidency in June 1865 and subsequently served as Grand Commander of the Supreme Confederate Council of the 33rd Degree for Venezuela. (Note: Collectif 2017, p. 209, Alain de Keghel)

Between 1870 and 1884, which saw Guzmán as president, Freemasonry flourished despite the autocratic rule that Guzmán exercised. He implemented secular, and liberal reforms, promoted free education, and established over 1,200 schools that educated more than 50,000 students by 1876. He abolished slavery once more, drafted legal codes, and guaranteed press freedom in 1878, thereby fostering the publication of over 62 periodicals. A considerable number of lodges were created, disseminating liberal ideas throughout public and civil life. (Note: Collectif 2017, p. 210, Alain de Keghel)

==== Decline and normalization ====
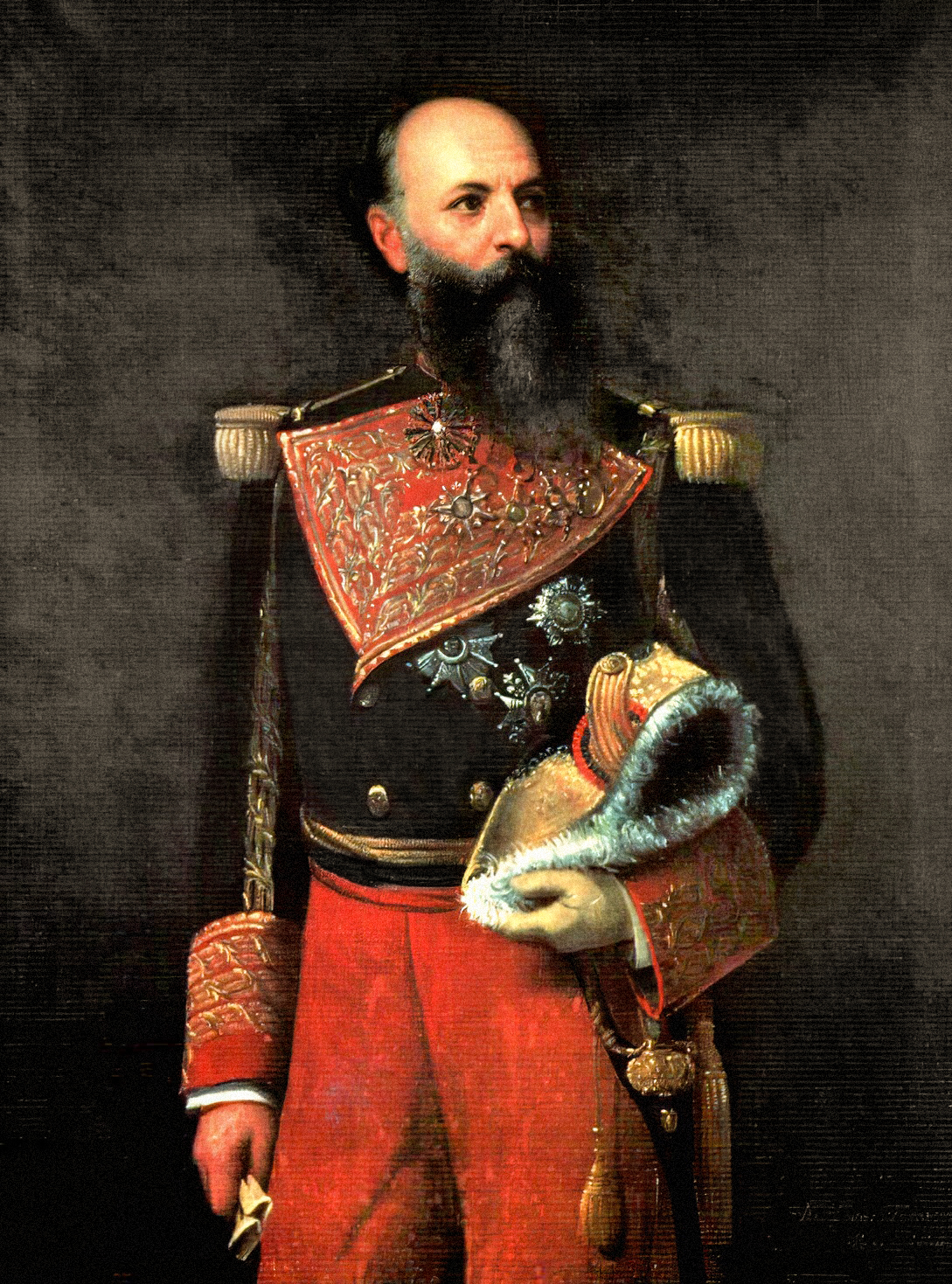
Antonio Guzmán Blanco

By the late 19th century, the number of Freemasons in Venezuela had begun to decline. The administration of Antonio Guzmán Blanco was subjected to intense scrutiny, and the lodges, which had attracted numerous members of the elite, became increasingly fragmented along lines of differing liberal ideologies, reflecting the country's growing political divisions. In the early 20th century, under the dictatorship of Juan Vicente Gómez, Freemasonry operated in a relatively favorable political climate. Nevertheless, by 1930, the movement was divided between those who accused it of abandoning Masonic ideals and those who benefited from the oil wealth controlled by American and British companies. (Note: Collectif 2017, p. 211, Alain de Keghel) In 1945, under the dictatorship of Luis Felipe Llovera Páez, Freemasonry was subjected to a combination of restrictions and toleration. While not wholly antagonistic, the regime enacted a prohibition on women's adoption lodges and incarcerated several female members. Freemasons were polarized between resisting the regime and collaborating with it. With the dictatorship's collapse in 1958, Freemasonry, debilitated and discredited, disengaged from politics, concentrating instead on rites and rituals. (Note: Collectif 2017, pp. 214–215, Alain de Keghel)

By the late 20th century, Masonic lodges in Venezuela were still in existence, though their vitality had diminished. In 1974, a noteworthy development took place with the establishment of the Gran Logia Femenina de Venezuela (Grand Feminine Lodge of Venezuela). (Note: Collectif 2017, p. 218, Alain de Keghel) In the 21st century, several high-grade jurisdictions continue to operate, including the Supreme Confederate Council of the 33rd Degree of the Republic of Venezuela, which was established in 1840, and the High Masonic Council of Venezuela for the York Rite. While the majority of lodges adhere to a policy of exclusivity concerning gender, some mixed lodges have been established under the aegis of the Fédération Vénézuélienne du Droit Humain (Venezuelan Federation of Human Rights). As of 2017, the precise number of members is uncertain due to the fragmentation of data, although estimates suggest a figure of approximately 60,000. However, this figure has not been corroborated. (Note: Collectif 2017, p. 219, Alain de Keghel)

== British Antilles ==
Freemasonry in the English-speaking Caribbean is inextricably linked to the British Empire and is firmly established within the context of English, Irish, and Scottish Masonic traditions. While exhibiting a slight degree of influence from French traditions in select islands, such as Saint Lucia and Trinidad, it has significantly impacted the religious and educational spheres. Freemasonry has become deeply integrated into local society, motivating its members to actively engage in civic endeavors. (Note: Collectif 2017, p. 133, Cécile Révauger)

The inaugural Masonic lodge in the Caribbean, Parham Lodge, was established in Antigua on 31 January 1738, under a charter from the Grand Lodge of England. The second island to experience the establishment of Freemasonry was Jamaica in 1739, followed by Barbados in March 1740 with the formation of Saint Michael Lodge. The inaugural lodge in Grenada, Saint Andrew No. 243, was established in 1764. (Note: Collectif 2017, p. 114, Cécile Révauger) The evolution of Freemasonry in these islands was subject to significant variation due to the influence of local contexts. For example, Barbados remained under English rule, Trinidad was populated by French planters despite Spanish domination, (Note: Collectif 2017, p. 115, Cécile Révauger) and Grenada remained French until it was ceded to England in 1763. The lodges established in these regions initially served to create a colonial elite, strengthening ties with their respective metropoles. Concurrently, they fostered connections between the islands and contributed to the emergence of local elites and national identities. (Note: Collectif 2017, p. 117, Cécile Révauger)

In the Caribbean, Masonic lodges primarily recruit members from the wealthy and elite classes of the population. It is more common for workers and artisans to join mutual aid societies, such as the Foresters, which remain active in the 21st century. Unlike Masonic lodges, these societies admit both men and women without distinction. (Note: Collectif 2017, p. 129, Cécile Révauger) However, following the abolition of slavery, Freemasonry became accessible to individuals from a broader range of social backgrounds, thereby contributing to the emergence of a new elite as the British Empire diminished in influence. Freemasons became involved in civic life, with a particular focus on education and religion, and to a lesser extent, politics, through the actions of a few of their members. (Note: Collectif 2017, p. 131, Cécile Révauger) Caribbean Freemasons typically exhibit a lack of concern for the secularism that is a hallmark of French Freemasonry. Freemasons openly and financially support various churches in their countries, (Note: Collectif 2017, p. 132, Cécile Révauger) and many clergy members are part of Freemasonry in the Caribbean. The importance of religion in these islands and the close ties it shares with Freemasonry reflect the Masons' engagement in local life. Freemasonry accompanied the emancipation movements, with several governors and governors-general being members of Masonic orders, though it never took a clear stance on the issue.

A review of the historical documentation reveals that Caribbean Freemasonry is primarily rooted in the British Empire and predominantly developed under English, Scottish, and Irish obediences. French Masonic influence, as evidenced in Saint Lucia and Trinidad, remains relatively marginal in the Masonic history of the British Caribbean.

== French Antilles and Guyana ==
=== Martinique ===
The establishment of the lodge La Parfaite Union in 1738 by a group of merchants and sailors signified the advent of Freemasonry in Martinique, particularly in Saint-Pierre. The French Revolution and the subsequent period of conflict with England, which controlled the island until the signing of the Treaty of Amiens in 1802, resulted in the interruption of Masonic activities. During this brief period of peace, the lodge L'Harmonie was established, attracting members of the Napoleonic political and military elite. However, following England's second occupation of Martinique from 1809 to 1814, Masonic activity was once again suspended. Despite the Treaty of 30 May 1814, which returned Martinique and Guadeloupe to France, Masonic activity remained modest. (Note: Collectif 2017, p. 143, Alain de Keghel)

Towards the conclusion of the Second Empire, a period marked by a decline in Masonic activities, the lodges witnessed a resurgence, bolstered by the support of French obediences. The Grand Orient of France (GODF) reactivated La Réunion des Arts, while the Grand Lodge of France (GLDF) revived L'Union Parfaite. In Fort-de-France, the lodge La Trigonométrie saw some of its members engage in abolitionism and republicanism, though these political lodges were subject to monitoring by imperial police. On 8 May 1902, the eruption of Mount Pelée resulted in the destruction of Saint-Pierre and the deaths of 30,000 individuals, with 22 lodges within the city also being obliterated. The catastrophe brought about the cessation of Masonic activities until 1909 when the Grand Orient of France (GODF) reestablished lodges in Fort-de-France. This involved the creation or reactivation of several symbolic lodges and high-grade chapters. Additionally, the GLDF rebuilt workshops. Both obediences demonstrated cooperation and organized a joint congress in 1925. This collaboration facilitated the introduction of female and mixed Freemasonry, with both obediences supporting Le Droit Humain in founding several lodges in the city. As in Europe, Masonic activities were banned during World War II but resumed after the conflict. (Note: Collectif 2017, p. 144, Alain de Keghel)

In 1972, the National Grand Lodge of France established a presence with the lodge Abraham Lincoln. Between 1979 and 1989, this obedience established seven additional lodges. Over time, other obediences of various rites opened lodges in Martinique. By 1991, the Women's Grand Lodge Of France had also established lodges, joining a wide range of French and Anglo-Saxon obediences. The precise number of Freemasons in Martinique remains uncertain, with figures from 2017 suggesting a few thousand members, though precise data is lacking. (Note: Collectif 2017, p. 145, Alain de Keghel)

=== Guadeloupe ===
Guadeloupe was governed by strict and impermeable societal rules under French colonial rule, which began in 1635. These rules divided the population into three groups: The European population held all rights, while the remaining Amerindian populations and enslaved Africans were denied even the most basic rights. In the prosperous colony of Saint-Domingue, up to 19 Masonic lodges reflected the colonial management system. These lodges demonstrated minimal concern for the mistreatment of slaves or indigenous peoples, prioritizing the interests of plantation owners over the broader colonial society in the Antilles and Guadeloupe. (Note: Collectif 2017, p. 146, Alain de Keghel) Racial prejudices were deeply entrenched in the workshops; the few freemasons of color or freed individuals were often initiated outside the colonies. Even then, they rarely attained the Companion rank and were frequently relegated to the role of Frères Servants (serving brothers) for life. (Note: Collectif 2017, p. 147, Alain de Keghel)

In Guadeloupe, the establishment of Freemasonry was contingent upon the abolition of slavery, which occurred in 1831. On 14 February 1861, the inaugural Masonic lodge authorized to initiate men of color was established by three Europeans and five men of color who had previously been initiated. However, the robust antagonisms between disparate groups in the population meant that the event went largely unnoticed. (Note: Collectif 2017, p. 148, Alain de Keghel) Lodges of that era had relatively brief lifespans, primarily due to their sociological composition, and, like Freemasonry throughout the Antilles, they often functioned more as mutual aid societies. (Note: Collectif 2017, p. 149, Keghel)

One of the earliest documented lodges in Guadeloupe was La Paix, established in 1784 in Pointe-à-Pitre. Under its historical context, this lodge was commissioned by the Grand Orient of France to convene a gathering of the lodges in Grande-Terre, which brought together the majority of Freemasons in the region to collaborate on the drafting of the Declaration of the Rights of Man and Citizen. However, the arrival of revolutionary leader Victor Hugues in 1794 marked the beginning of a period of persecution. The lodges were closed, numerous Freemasons were pursued or deprived of their property, and some were compelled to seek refuge on neighboring islands, where they regrouped to establish new lodges. (Note: Collectif 2017, p. 150, Keghel) In 1826, the lodge Les Élus d'Occident was established in Basse-Terre and resumed activities. However, the donation of land designated for the construction of the Masonic Temple was subsequently used for the construction of a secular school, a condition attached to the donation made by a wealthy member. Between 1903 and 1939, Masonic lodges experienced a period of stagnation, weakened by economic conditions and the Catholic clergy's increasing interference in public life.

During the Second World War, Freemasonry in the area was severely impacted by the anti-Masonic legislation enacted by the Vichy regime. Both movable and immovable assets were confiscated and destroyed. The temple of Les Élus d'Occident was confiscated, sold to the Diocese for a symbolic franc, and completely demolished to erase all traces of Freemasonry at the site. (Note: Collectif 2017, p. 151, Keghel) Following the Liberation, lodges were rebuilt, and obediences gradually established themselves in the region. Over time, they developed a robust Freemasonry in the overseas territories, comprising various Masonic rites and jurisdictions—both symbolic and high-grade—that represented all currents of Freemasonry. (Note: Collectif 2017, p. 155, Keghel)

=== Guyana ===
Freemasonry was introduced to Guyana in 1765 by the first Grand Lodge of France, which served as a bridgehead for French Freemasonry in Latin America. The inaugural two lodges to register with the Grand Orient were Saint-Jean de Guyane (1765) and the military lodge Saint-Jean de la Gloire (1769). In the nineteenth and twentieth centuries, the Grand Orient of France and the Second Grand Lodge of France established many lodges. Le Droit Humain became active in 1969, and both the National Grand Lodge of France and the Women's Grand Lodge of France established lodges in 1994. (Note: Collectif 2017, p. 156, Keghel) This proliferation reflects the vitality of Guyanese Freemasonry, which also hosts Supreme Councils for high-grade jurisdictions. Despite the geographical distance and language differences, these councils collaborate harmoniously with their counterparts in Martinique and Guadeloupe. (Note: Collectif 2017, p. 157, Keghel)

== Cuba ==
=== Colonial period ===
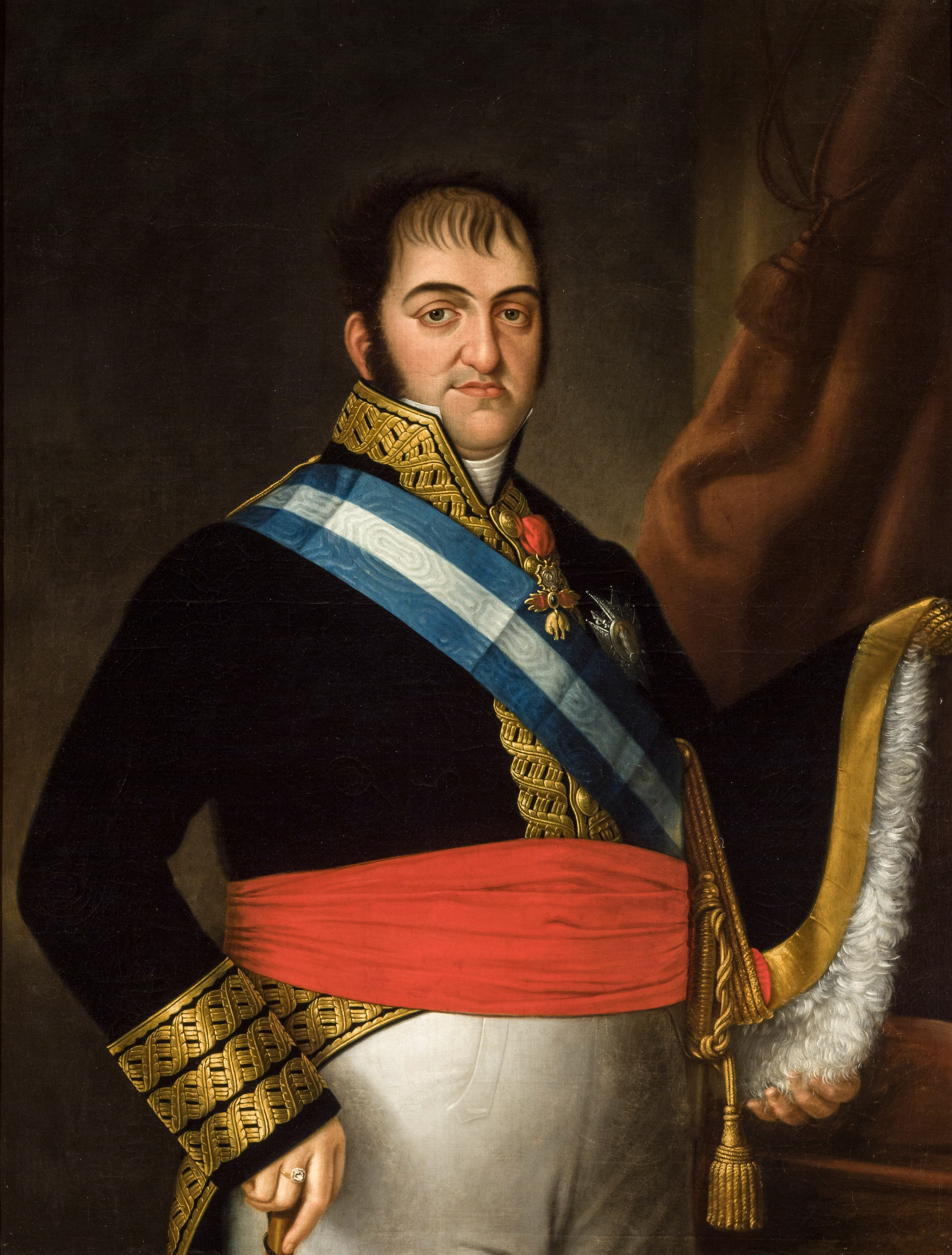
Fernando VII (Seville City Hall)

The history of Cuban Freemasonry can be traced back to migrants from Haiti, which had proclaimed itself a free republic in 1804 following the abolition of slavery. The initial lodges established were of French origin, including La Persévérance et la Concorde in Santiago and La Bénéfique Concorde in Havana. The lodge Le Temple des Vertus Théologales No. 103 was established in Cuba in 1804 under a patent from the Grand Lodge of Pennsylvania. Additionally, the Grand Lodges of Louisiana and South Carolina established lodges, which remained under French Masonic influence. (Note: Collectif 2017, p. 164, Joan Ponte Clemente)

In 1818, a superior-grade chamber of the Ancient and Accepted Scottish Rite was established by Colonel Louis de Clouet d'Obernay. This consistory established a Spanish territorial Grand Orient, comprising Spanish nationals and assimilated Creoles. The Grand Orient of France initially depended on the Spanish National Grand Orient in 1821 but became independent in 1822. It helped create several lodges on the island and founded the Grand Lodge of the York Rite. However, these institutions were short-lived due to the anti-liberal repression of Ferdinand VII in Spain, which affected Cuba. By 1830–1831, all but the La Parfaite Union lodge of the Grand Orient of France had disappeared.

The second half of the nineteenth century witnessed a resurgence of Masonic activity on the island, shaped by Cuba's geopolitical circumstances and influenced by North American traditions. These new jurisdictions established a clear separation from Spanish jurisdictions, which eventually acknowledged the autonomy of Masonic organizations in the Spanish Caribbean. (Note: Collectif 2017, p. 165, Joan Ponte Clemente) In 1861, Albert Pike, the commander of the Supreme Council of the Southern Jurisdiction of the United States, endeavored to assume control of the Supreme Council of Colón. When this endeavor proved unsuccessful, he proceeded to establish a second jurisdiction, designated the Cuba and Antilles Jurisdiction. From this period onward, Cuban Freemasonry engaged in substantial philanthropic endeavors, advocating for the emancipation of slaves and the advancement of the lives of people of color. Additionally, Freemasonry advocated for secular education and free thought, opposing clerical control over education. (Note: Collectif 2017, p. 166, Joan Ponte Clemente) The decree of 31 December 1879, issued by the island's general government mandating compulsory primary education, was met with approval by Cuban Freemasons. By the late 19th century, they had established the first orphanages for Masonic children and night schools for adult education. (Note: Collectif 2017, p. 167, Joan Ponte Clemente)

The Masonic press first appeared in 1869 with the bimonthly publication Le Compas. In 1874, El Silencio was published, becoming the official organ of the Grand Orient of Colón the following year. However, it was promptly banned due to its advocacy of human rights. In April 1881, the magazine Gran Logia commenced publication and remains the oldest Masonic publication in Latin America as of 2018. The question of female Freemasonry first arose in the late 19th century and was temporarily addressed by para-Masonic societies such as Hijas de la Estrella de Oriente (Daughters of the Eastern Star). However, in 1889, the first lodge of adoption was created under the auspices of the Grand Orient of Spain. (Note: Collectif 2017, p. 168, Joan Ponte Clemente)

As an institution, Cuban Freemasonry officially opposed slavery, even though some Freemasons were slave owners. This struggle became increasingly radicalized after 1883, and by forming alliances with other abolitionist organizations, they were ultimately successful in achieving the abolition of slavery in 1886. (Note: Collectif 2017, p. 169, Joan Ponte Clemente)

Cuban Freemasonry encountered the same anti-Masonic sentiment that was pervasive throughout Spanish territories. In 1868, the Bishop of Havana, José Orbera Carrión, denounced Freemasonry, asserting that it was influenced by satanic powers that were working against the Church and the State. In 1877, he underscored the conflict between Catholic dogma and Masonic principles.

=== Independence and revolution ===
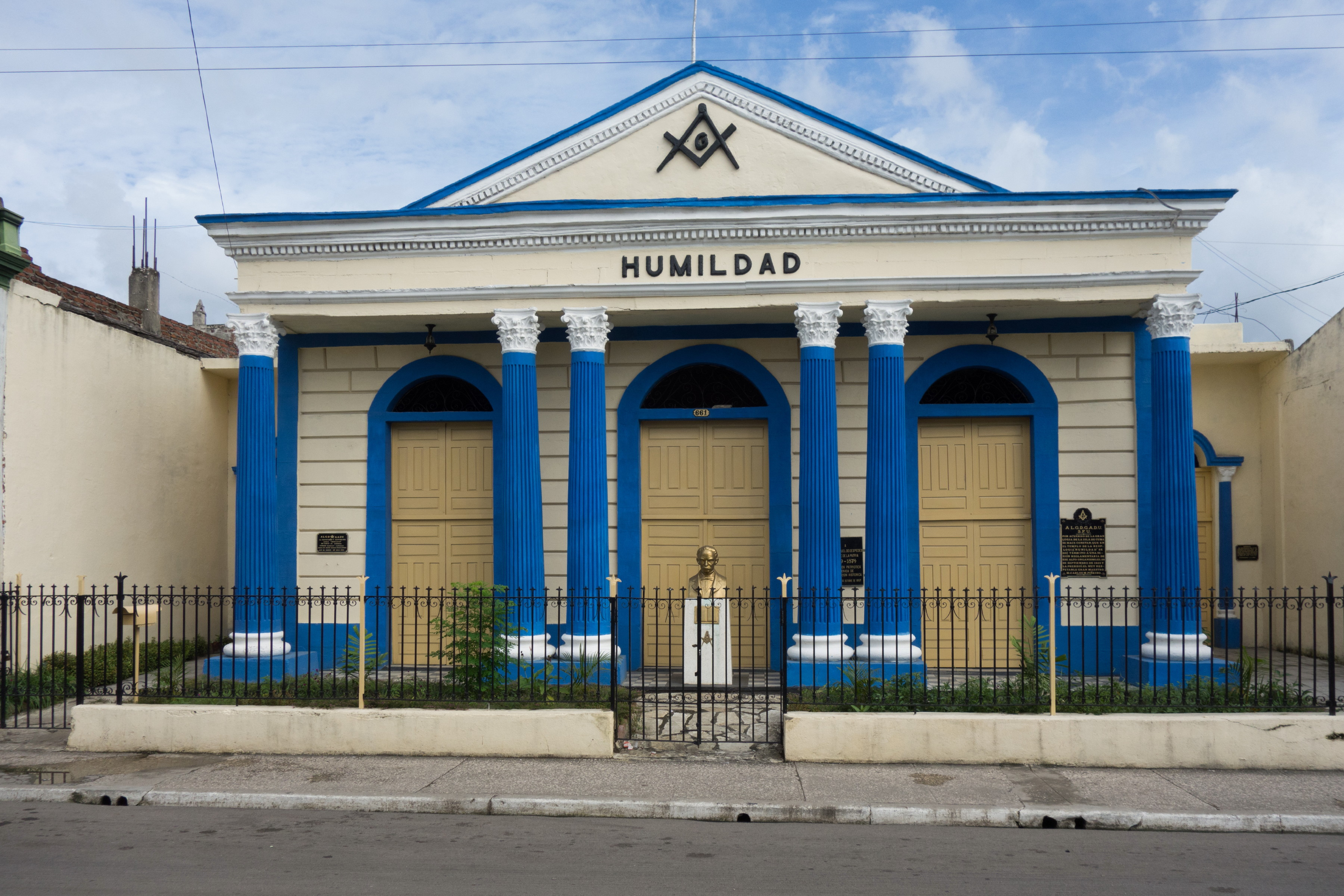
Temple of the Humildad lodge in Guantánamo

In contrast with the popular belief that Freemasonry was involved in a Masonic conspiracy that led to Cuba's independence, historical evidence demonstrates that Freemasonry remained largely autonomous from extremist groups. José Martí, regarded as the father of the Cuban nation, was a Freemason, though he did not belong to any official obedience. He was initiated between February and July 1871 at the Caballeros Cruzados lodge in Madrid, which was affiliated with the United Grand Orient of Lusitania. His symbolic name (Note: The symbolic name is an Iberian Masonic tradition that persists into the 21st century, whereby a Freemason is identified with a specific concept or virtue. (Note: Collectif 2017, p. 170, Joan Ponte Clemente)) was Anahuac.

Before the War of Independence, during which Freemasonry was prohibited in Cuba, it distinguished itself by advocating pluralism, which is synonymous with tolerance, free thought, and reason. This was in opposition to the "singularism" of the Spanish metropolis, which was shaped by Roman Catholicism. Following the conclusion of the war, Freemasonry adopted a stance supportive of the newly established republican principles and a secular society. From 1902 to 1933, a period of considerable prosperity for Cuban Freemasonry, the organization became closely associated with the Republic and exerted considerable influence on the drafting and adoption of the 1901 Constitution. (Note: Collectif 2017, p. 171, Joan Ponte Clemente) Throughout the 20th century, Cuban Freemasonry engaged in philanthropic activities and established support institutions for Freemasons and impoverished communities. (Note: Collectif 2017, p. 173, Joan Ponte Clemente)

In the mid-20th century, Cuban Freemasonry reflected the broader societal landscape, with a strong presence among the middle class and a pervasive presence throughout the country. Each of the country's major cities had at least one Masonic Temple, which was often frequented by merchants, intellectuals, and prominent politicians. (Note: Collectif 2017, p. 174, Joan Ponte Clemente) At the outset of the Cuban Revolution, the general population and Freemasonry expressed support, particularly for the initial measures taken. However, this stance underwent a transformation following the declaration of the revolution as socialist and the nationalization of small businesses. Although the revolution did not formally abolish Freemasonry on the island, the new regime did not encourage its growth and closely monitored the activities of its obediences. Freemasonry was officially deemed incompatible with membership in the Cuban Communist Party, although Freemasons were not persecuted. The government argued that joining a fraternal society was unnecessary since, in its view, the revolution itself embodied true fraternity. (Note: Collectif 2017, p. 175, Joan Ponte Clemente)

== See also ==
- Freemasonry
- Freemasonry during World War I

== Bibliography ==
- Naudon, Paul (1981). Histoire générale de la franc-maçonnerie [General history of Freemasonry] (in French). Presses Universitaires de France. ISBN 2-13-037281-3.
- de Keghel, Alain (2018). "La franc-maçonnerie en Amérique latine" [Freemasonry in Latin America]. La Chaîne d'union (in French) (83).
- Collectif (2017). L'amérique latine et la Caraïbes des Lumières : Une franc-maçonnerie d'influence [Latin America and the Caribbean of the Enlightenment: A Freemasonry of influence] (in French). Paris: Dervy. ISBN 979-10-242-0218-1.
