= La Clémente Amitié =

Masonic lodge of the Grand Orient de France, founded in 1805 in Paris

- Formation: March 8, 1805
- Type: Masonic lodge
- Headquarters: Paris, France
- Affiliations: Grand Orient de France

La Clémente Amitié is the name of a Masonic lodge affiliated with the Grand Orient de France, established in 1805 at Paris. Over the two centuries following its founding, the lodge included numerous notable public figures, intellectuals, and politicians among its members. It marked its bicentennial in 2005.

== History ==
La Clémente Amitié was officially founded on March 8, 1805, and its history is marked by several defining periods. In 1824, it established l'Ordre de la récompense ("The Order of Reward"), which operated as a Masonic academy. In 1826, tensions with the Grand Orient de France led to its first threat of dissolution. Refusing to submit, the lodge operated under the Suprême Conseil de France from 1826 to 1834.

In 1844, the election of François-Timoléon Bègue-Clavel (1798–1852), a deist and republican Masonic scholar, as Worshipful Master ushered in a period of growth. Under his leadership, the lodge attracted a strong contingent of intellectual and republican elites, initiating and affiliating notable figures such as writer Félix Pyat, chansonnier Agénor Altaroche, publisher Laurent-Antoine Pagnerre, abolitionist deputy Victor Schœlcher, Fourierist Léon Gozlan, and future Finance Minister Charles Duclerc. This growth, however, brought conflict: Bègue-Clavel challenged the Grand Orient’s Senate, criticizing its conservative stance and advocating statutory reform. Deemed unlawful, this move resulted in his expulsion and the lodge’s brief dissolution. It later resumed operations under moderates such as lawyer Marie-Auguste Desanlis.

During the French Second Republic, Hyacinthe Leblanc de Marconay, a specialist in Caribbean issues and friend of Victor Schœlcher, emerged as a key figure. The lodge welcomed diverse members, including a Brazilian indigenous chief and several Caribbean figures such as Louisy Mathieu, a people’s representative in November 1848, and Pierre-Marie Pory-Papy, a Martinique deputy in January 1849. A scandal over mismanagement of an orphanage in Chartres, run by the lodge’s Worshipful Master, led to Leblanc de Marconay’s expulsion and a schism. On December 16, 1858, several members, including Charles Bataille, founded a new lodge, La Clémente Amitié cosmopolite ("The Cosmopolitan Clement Friendship").

After a period of obscurity, the lodge regained prominence under the French Third Republic with Charles Cousin, a future president of the Grand Orient’s Order Council, as Worshipful Master. By 1877, it had grown to 250 members, becoming one of the Grand Orient’s most significant lodges. In July 1875, under Grégoire Wyrouboff’s presidency, the lodge initiated Jules Ferry, Émile Littré, and Honoré Chavée in a single ceremony, an event that reverberated within and beyond French Freemasonry. Attended by numerous republican notables, the ceremony underscored the lodge’s influence. Charles Cousin also sponsored an early proposal for the Panama Canal project, with several members tied to the exploration company chaired by a lodge brother.

By 1881, membership reached 285, with prominent Third Republic figures like Camille Pelletan and Louis Ricard joining its ranks. Under Edgar Monteil’s leadership, the lodge intensified its anticlerical stance, condemning Masonic parliamentarians who supported religious budgets and calling for a ban on religious acts for Order Council members and their families. By 1896, it retained 145 members, including five deputies.

During World War II, former Worshipful Master Eugène Giraud organized clandestine meetings, contributing to an underground Masonic network.

== See also ==
- Freemasonry in France
- Grand Orient de France
- French Third Republic
- French Second Republic
- History of Freemasonry
- Grande Loge Nationale Française
- La Chaîne d'Union
- Freemasonry in Brazil
- Freemasonry in Latin America
- List of Masonic Grand Lodges

== Bibliography ==
- Monnier, Raymonde (2002). "Encyclopédie de la franc‑maçonnerie". Annales historiques de la Révolution française. 328 (328): 246–247. doi:10.4000/ahrf.2282.
- Mainguy, Irène (2006). "La Clémente Amitié 1805-2005. Histoire d'un bicentenaire" [La Clémente Amitié 1805-2005: History of a Bicentennial]. La Chaîne d'Union (in French). 38 (1). Clam: 180. doi:10.3917/cdu.038.0093e.
