= Maurice Joly =

French satirist and lawyer (1829–1878)

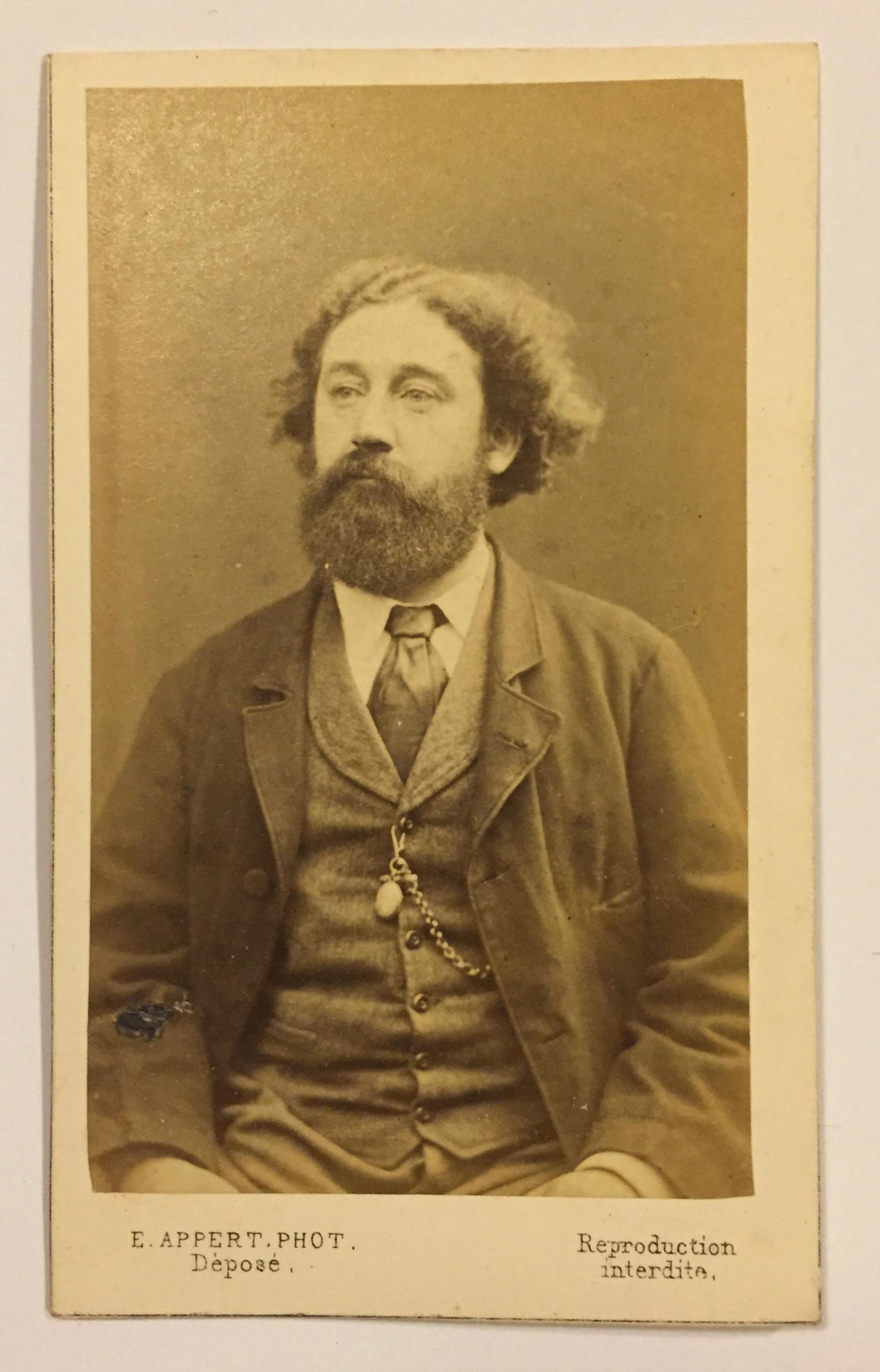
- Albumen photograph by Eugène Appert, c. 1870
- Born: 22 September 1829; Lons-le-Saunier, France
- Died: 15 July 1878 (aged 48); Paris, France
- Occupations: Writer, lawyer
- Writing career
- Language: French
- Period: 1862–1878
- Genre: Political satire
- Notable work: Dialogue aux enfers entre Machiavel et Montesquieu

Maurice Joly (French pronunciation: [mɔʁis ʒɔli]; 22 September 1829 – 15 July 1878) was a French political writer and lawyer known for The Dialogue in Hell Between Machiavelli and Montesquieu, a political satire of Napoleon III.

== Known life ==
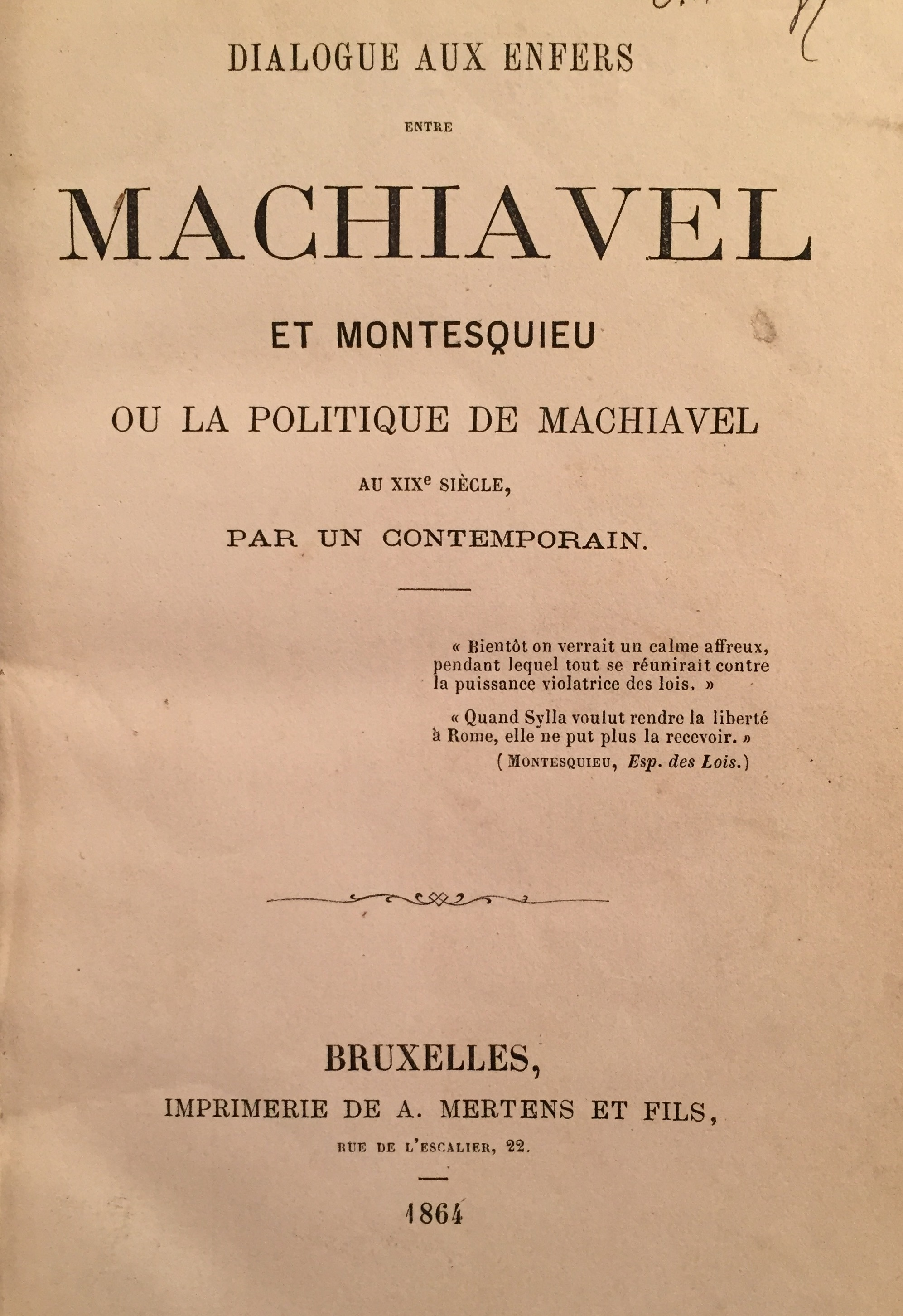
Dialogue aux enfers, 1864

Most of the known information about Monsieur Joly is based upon his autobiographical sketch, Maurice Joly, Son Passé, Son Programme, par Lui-même, written at Conciergerie prison in November 1870, where he was jailed for an assault at Hôtel de Ville, Paris. Some additional facts are mentioned at Henry Rollin's book, L'Apocalypse de notre temps, and in Maurice Joly, un suicidé de la démocratie – a preface to a modern publication of Joly's Dialogue aux enfers entre Machiavel et Montesquieu, Épilogue and César – by the mysterious F. Leclercq.

Joly was born in the small town of Lons-le-Saunier, in the département of Jura, to a French father and an Italian mother. He studied law in Dijon, but stopped in 1849 in order to go to Paris, where he worked as a clerk at various governmental institutions for about 10 years. He successfully completed his legal studies and was finally admitted to the Paris bar in 1859.

He started writing in 1862, supplying literary portraits of his fellow lawyers to a small magazine, Gorgias, and later published these sketches as a stand-alone book, Le Barreau de Paris, followed by Les Principes de 89 and Supplément à la géographie politique du Jura. Then Joly concocted a lampoon, César, where he attacked the political regime of Napoleon III (Louis-Napoléon Bonaparte). The books were printed by the Martin-Beaupré brothers and swiftly destroyed by the publishers. Not a single copy survived.

In 1864, Joly wrote his best-known book, The Dialogue in Hell, a satirical attack on Bonaparte's authoritarianism, and a defense of republicanism. The piece uses the literary device of a dialogue of the dead, invented by ancient Roman writer Lucian and introduced into the French belles-lettres by Bernard de Fontenelle in the 18th century. Shades of the historical figures Niccolò Machiavelli and Charles-Louis de Secondat, Baron de La Brède et de Montesquieu meet in Hell in the year 1864 and dispute on politics. In this way, Joly tried to conceal a direct, and then illegal, criticism of Louis-Napoleon's rule.

Joly relates, in his 1870 autobiography, that one evening thinking of Abbé Galiani's treatise Dialogues sur le commerce des bleds and walking by the Pont Royal, he was inspired to write a dialogue between Montesquieu and Machiavelli. The noble baron Montesquieu (whom Joly consigned to Hell in his book because of Montesquieu's support of republics/democracies) would make the case for liberalism; the Florentine politician Machiavelli would present the case for despotism.

In the Dialogue, Machiavelli claims that he "... wouldn't even need twenty years to transform utterly the most indomitable European character and render it as a docile under tyranny as the debased people of Asia." Montesquieu insists that the liberal spirit of the peoples is invincible. In 25 dialogues, step by step, Machiavelli, who by Joly's plot covertly represents Napoleon III, explains how he would replace freedom with despotism in any given European country: "...Absolute power will no longer be an accident of fortune but will become a need" of the modern society. At the end, Machiavelli prevails. In the curtain-line Montesquieu exclaims "Eternal God, what have you permitted!..."

The book was published anonymously (with the by-line par un contemporain, 'by a contemporary') in Brussels in 1864 and smuggled into France for distribution, but the print-run was seized by the police immediately upon crossing the border. The police swiftly tracked down its author, and Joly was arrested. The book was banned. On 25 April 1865, he was sentenced to 18 months at the Sainte-Pélagie Prison in Paris. The second edition of the Dialogues was issued in 1868 under Joly's name. This time, it reached the readers. But its author remained in obscurity. He established a new journal, Le Palais, that ended after a confrontation with the principal collaborator in the enterprise. After the fall of the Empire in 1870, Joly sought a governmental position from Jules Grévy. He failed in this too. Campaigning against Napoleon III at the 1870 French constitutional referendum, Joly wrote an epilogue to his Dialogues. It was published in Le Gaulois and La Cloche magazines.

In 1871, he was a low-rank member of the Paris Commune and in his last years he joined the Masonic lodge La Clémente Amitié.

Though it gained Joly the reputation of a scandalous and bully barrator, he sued ten newspapers, one after another, either for not accepting his stories or for not publishing news about him. Joly's name was completely forgotten, and in life he did not attain the glory he so obsessively craved.

Joly was found dead on 15 July 1878 in his 5 Quai Voltaire apartment in Paris. The declared cause of his death was gunshot suicide. The circumstances meant that the exact date of his death could not be established.

== Posthumous fame ==
The Dialogue and its author became famous later for an unintended and bizarre reason. Early in the 20th century, extensive passages from Joly's book were used to fraudulently concoct The Protocols of the Elders of Zion, an infamous Russian-made antisemitic literary forgery. Neither the Dialogue itself, nor the text copied from it were antisemitic. They merely formed the scaffolding upon which the calumny against the Jewish people was built. An abundance of evidence from the Berne Trial and other research established that The Protocols were lavishly plagiarized from Joly's book.

In his book Six Walks in the Fictional Woods (1994), Italian writer Umberto Eco claims that in the Dialogue, Joly plagiarized seven pages or more from a popular novel The Mysteries of Paris by Eugene Sue. Joly is also a character in Eco's novel, The Prague Cemetery.

In 2015 one of the streets in Lons-le-Saunier was named Rue Maurice Joly.

== Publications ==
- 1863: Le Barreau de Paris, études politiques et littéraires. Paris, Gosselin.
- 1863: Les Principes de 89 par Maurice Joly, avocat. Paris, E. Dentu.
- 1864: Dialogue aux enfers entre Machiavel et Montesquieu|Dialogue aux enfers entre Machiavel et Montesquieu ou la politique de Machiavel au XIXe siècle. Bruxelles, A. Mertens et fils.
- 1865: César, Paris, Martin-Beaupré frères.
- 1868: Recherches sur l'art de parvenir. Paris, Amyot.
- 1870: Maurice Joly, son passé, son programme, par lui-même. Paris, Lacroix, Verbɶckhoven et Co.
- 1870: Dialogue aux Enfers entre Machiavel et Montesquieu. Épilogue. Le Gaulois: littéraire et politique, 664, 30 April 1870, pp.2–3; La Cloche 2 May 1870 – 10 May 1870.
- 1872: Le Tiers-Parti républicain. Paris, E. Dentu.
- 1876: Les Affamés, étude de mœurs contemporains. Paris, E. Dentu.
