= Clement E. Stretton =

English railway historian, author and Freemason (1850–1915)

Clement E. Stretton C.E., A.R.I.B.A..
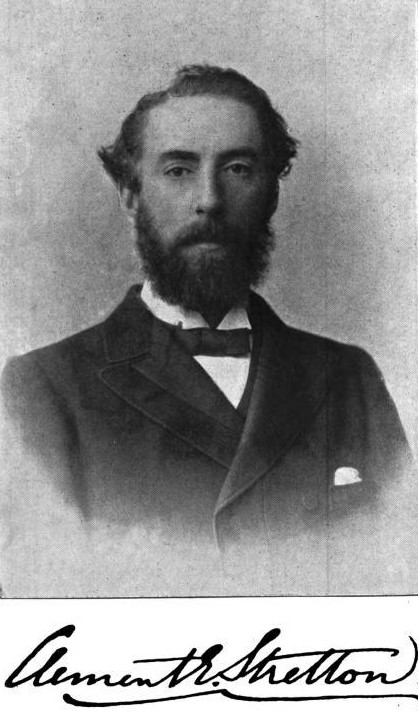
- Born: 3 October 1850; Leicester, England
- Died: 20 February 1915 (aged 64); Leicester, England
- Occupations: Consulting engineer, author
- Spouse: Alice Hannah Thompson (m. 14 February 1878, d. 28 November 1885)
- Children: Clement (b. 12 May 1879); Alice (b. 28 June 1880)
- Relatives: Clement (father)
- Writing career
- Subjects: Railways; Freemasonry

Clement Edwin Stretton (3 October 1850 — 20 February 1915) was a consulting engineer and author. He wrote several books, as well as numerous papers on the subjects of railways and Freemasonry, being active during the latter part of the 19th and early 20th centuries. His two major works, Safe Railway Working: A Treatise on Railway Accidents (1887) and The Locomotive Engine and its Development (1892), ran to 3 and 6 editions respectively. He also produced a lengthy history of the Midland Railway (1901).

During his lifetime Stretton was (and still remains) a somewhat controversial figure as his writing on railways contains many inaccuracies and fabrications. He became involved in long-running and bitter dispute with G. A. Sekon, editor of The Railway Magazine.

== Life ==
Stretton was born in Leicester in 1850, the son of Julia Stanbury (née Osborn) and Clement Stretton, a solicitor and later mayor of Leicester. It is uncertain where he was educated, as whilst several source states that he attended Rugby School, his name is not listed in the printed register of alumni. However, it seems that in 1866 he was articled to a Civil Engineering firm for £300.

Stretton claims he was assigned to work at a quarry in Cromford, Derbyshire. He claims the Guild Masons at the quarry refused to work with him, but when he joined the Operative Society after a few days he received total support from them. Stretton thereafter worked his way through the degrees of the Operative Masonry.

In 1871 also became initiated into Speculative Masonry at the Leicester Lodge.

Stretton was a prolific railway writer but there are wide and strong concerns about his fabrication of stories, inaccurate drawings, and long detailed lists of fictitious locomotives which he claimed had been constructed by several British firms such as Vulcan Foundry. He published this erroneous material very widely in books, magazines and local newspapers all over Britain, and donated faulty drawings to the Science Museum in London, so his efforts soon found their way into books written by otherwise reliable authors. His invented 'works lists' of the products of locomotive building firms continue to appear in print.

In 1908 Stretton re-visited the Derby Lodge and noted a substantial decline in membership. This initiated Stretton into an attempt to make efforts to revive Guild Masonry and ensure the traditions were not lost. He has received credit for his work in passing down the information from the Operative Guild which might otherwise have been lost. John Yarker of Manchester was also active in these efforts.

Stretton died in 1915.

== Legacy ==
Railway track items in the Stretton Collection are held at Leicester Museum & Art Gallery.

== Bibliography ==
Stretton was a prolific writer on railway and masonic matters, his larger works online include:

- Safe Railway Working: a Treatise on Railway Accidents: Their Cause and Prevention With a Description of Modern Appliances and Systems (3rd ed.). London: Crobsy, Lockwood and Son. 1893 [1887]. OCLC 503789878. OL 20605374M.
- The Locomotive Engine and Its Development (6th ed.). London: Crosby, Lockwood and Son. 1903 [1892]. OCLC 265878314. OL 20443807M.
- The History of the Midland Railway. London: Methuen & Co. 1901. OCLC 503789580. OL 6922282M.
