= Freemasonry in Brazil =

History of Freemansonry in Brazil

The presence of Freemasonry in Brazil is mentioned in several documents beginning in 1797. Banned several times throughout its history, Freemasonry experienced rapid growth in the country between bans and spread to Paraguay and Uruguay. The first obedience to be created was the Grande Oriente do Brasil in 1822, by three French lodges. Strongly opposed by the Catholic clergy, it united from 1883-1927 after a long period of division. Brazilian Freemasonry is the largest in South America in terms of membership. In 2017, all the obedient currents were present on its territory.

== History ==
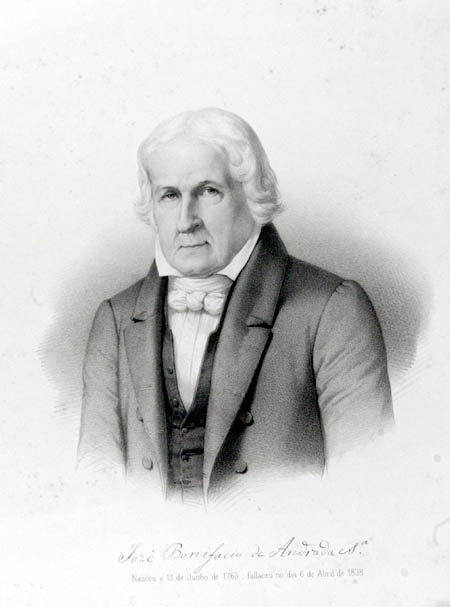
José Bonifácio de Andrada e Silva.

As of 2017, some historians dispute the claim of existence before the 19th century, while others place the first documented creations around 1801. It was banned for the first time between 1806 and 1819 by viceroy Count dos Arcos. When Peter I of Brazil was proclaimed emperor in 1822, three French lodges founded the Grand Orient of Brazil. José Bonifácio de Andrada e Silva, Patriarch of Independence, was Grand Master for a time. He gave way to the emperor, who again banned Freemasonry for fear of its political activities. After his abdication and in 1831, lodge activity resumed. At this time, Brazilian Freemasonry took on a political character, involving itself in sedition movements aimed at Brazilian independence.

Thereafter, the Grand Orient of Brazil was reconstituted and began to expand, extending its influence to Uruguay and Paraguay. However, the situation of Freemasonry remained unstable, with many divisions, until 1883, when a majority of lodges rallied to obedience in the face of the hostility of a Catholic clergy active in anti-Masonry. This alliance lasted until 1927. A schism between high-grade jurisdictions and symbolic lodges led to the creation of 22 Grand Lodges, whose sovereignties were based on the borders of Brazilian states. The 22 Grand Lodges were recognized by the majority of American and Canadian obedience. At the same time, the Grand Orient of Brazil, the historic obedience, retained the recognition of English, Scottish, and Irish Grand Lodges, most notably that of the United Grand Lodge of England, which granted it exclusive recognition in 1935.

== See also ==
- Freemasonry in Latin America
- List of Masonic Grand Lodges
- La Chaîne d'Union

== Bibliography ==
- "La franc-maçonnerie en Amérique latine" [Freemasonry in Latin America]. La Chaîne d'Union (in French) (83): 92. 2018.
- Medioni, Henri (2018). La franc-maçonnerie au Brésil [Freemasonry in Brazil] (in French). Paris: Éditions Dualpha. p. 344. ISBN 978-2-35374-381-0.
- de Keghel, Alain (2017). L'amérique latine et la Caraïbes des Lumières: Une franc-maçonnerie d'influence [Latin America and the Caribbean of the Enlightenment: A Freemasonry of Influence] (in French). Preface by Pierre Mollier. Paris: Dervy. p. 450. ISBN 979-10-242-0218-1.
- Between revolution and human rights: the testimonies of Brazilian exiles at the Russell Tribunal II
