= High Masonic degrees =

Degrees of Freemasonry

In Freemasonry, the first three Masonic degrees constitute the fundamental degrees in all Rites they are called Blue Lodge of Craft degree.

Over time, various systems of optional "high Masonic degrees" or "Side Degree" have been added to these three fundamental degrees, practiced in workshops known as perfection lodges or chapters.

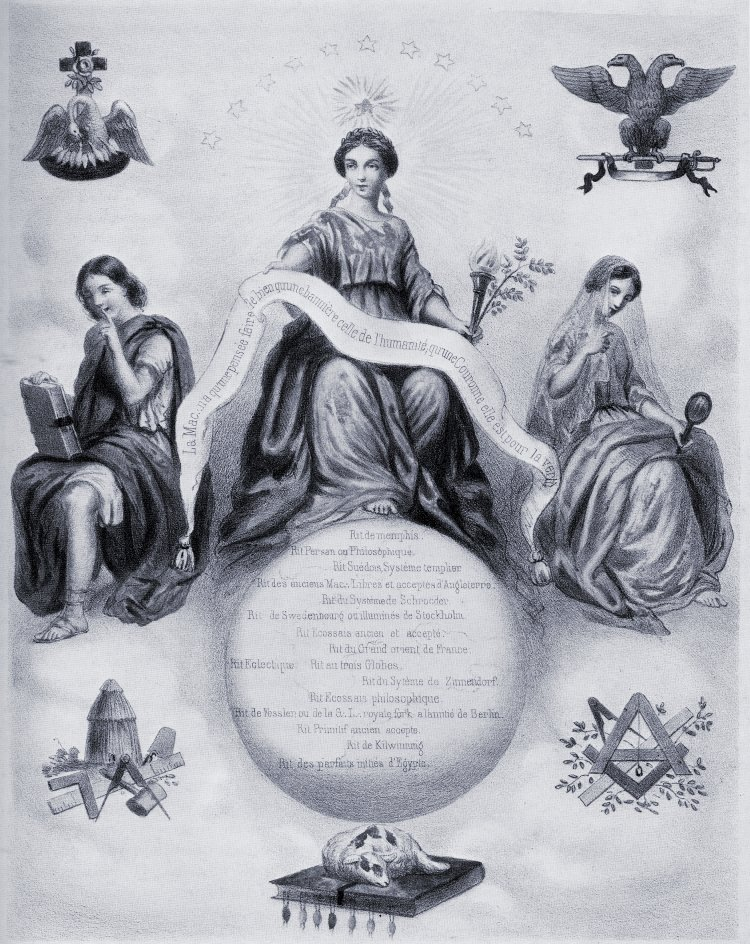

== History ==
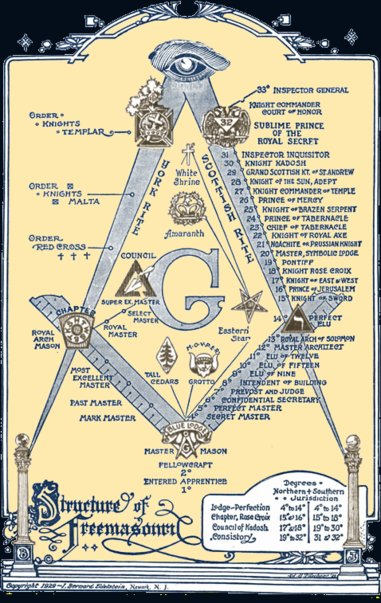

=== Early Origins (Pre-1717) ===
The earliest documented form of Freemasonry emerged from the operative masonic guilds of medieval Europe. During this period, it is mostly admitted that the craft maintained a simple two-degree system that directly reflected the practical organization of stonemason's work. Although some traditions such as the Operative Masons, maintain that the craft contained seven degrees before it was reduced to two. Some tradition maintain that the third degree legend was part of the second degree, while some other claim that it was a mystery played during feasts.

- Apprentice, Entered Apprentice or Apprentices to the Craft of Free Mason (first degree): This initial degree represented the beginning of a mason's journey, typically lasting seven years. Apprentices learned fundamental craft skills and basic moral teachings.

That no Master or fellow shall take any apprentice as his apprentice unless for seven years, and that apprentice be able of birth and of living as he ought to be." – The William Watson Manuscript

— William Watson, The William Watson Manuscript 1535

- Fellows of the Craft of Free Mason or Companion(second degree): Upon completing their apprenticeship, masons could advance to this level, indicating full membership in the craft guild.

Archaeological evidence from early lodge minutes, particularly from Scottish lodges, shows that this two-degree system was well-established by the late 16th century.

=== Transformation to Speculative Masonry (1717–1725) ===
The formation of the first Grand Lodge in London in 1717 marked a crucial transition period in Masonic history. During this time, the craft greatly shifted from operative to speculative Masonry, (this shift had started in the late 1500s) focusing more on moral, esoteric and philosophical teachings rather than practical stonework.

==== Introduction of the Third Degree ====
Although still heavily debated, the modern consensus claims that The Master Mason degree was cemented around 1725 in London, marking a significant evolution in Masonic ritual and symbolism, this legend was in direct competition with another "Noachite" legend. Other Scholar claim that the legend existed far before this date as it is hinted at in earlier rituals. This development:

- Established the three-degree system that would become fundamental to all Masonic Rites
- Created a more complex symbolic structure for Masonic teaching

=== Proliferation of Higher Degrees (1730–1760) ===
The period between 1730 and 1760 saw an unprecedented expansion in Masonic degrees, particularly in France and continental Europe.

==== Cultural Influences ====
Several factors contributed to this proliferation:

- Enlightenment Philosophy
  - Interest in esoteric knowledge and ancient mysteries
  - Emphasis on rational inquiry and systematic learning
  - Integration of Hermetic and Kabbalistic traditions
- Political Context
  - Rise of enlightened absolutism
  - Social upheavals in pre-revolutionary France
  - Growing influence of nobility in Masonic lodges
- Religious Developments
  - Tensions between traditional Christianity and new philosophical ideas
  - Integration of mystical and esoteric Christian traditions
  - Influence of Rosicrucianism and other esoteric movements

==== Major Centers of Development ====
Location	Notable contributions	Key figures
Paris	Development of Scottish Master degree	Chevalier Ramsay
Lyon	Strict Observance system	Jean-Baptiste Willermoz
Bordeaux	Perfection Rite	Stephen Morin
London	Royal Arch developments	Laurence Dermott

=== Systematization Period (1760–1800) ===
By the 1760s, over one hundred distinct Masonic degrees had been created. This proliferation led to efforts to systematize and organize these degrees into coherent systems.

==== Major Developments ====
- 1761 – Creation of the Rite of Perfection (25 degrees)
- 1771 – Establishment of the Strict Observance system
- 1783 - 1786 – Codification of the French Rite
- 1801 – Formation of the Ancient and Accepted Scottish Rite (33 degrees)

==== Notable Systems ====
French Rite The French Rite is one of the oldest systems in existence and was systematized in 1786 and solidified with the creation of the "Manuscrit de Moûtiers" of 1787 and later the publication of the Régulateur du Maçon in 1801, establishing a three degrees plus 4 orders system:

Blue Lodge

- 1st Degree: Entered Apprentice
- 2nd Degree: Fellow Craft
- 3rd Degree: Master Mason

Orders of Wisdom

- 1st Order: Élu (Elect)/ Master Elect
- 2dn Order: Ecossais / Grand Élu (Grand Elect)
- 3rd Order: Chevalier d'Orient / Knight of Masonry
- 4th Order: Rose-Croix / Perfect Sovereign Mason

Conservatory

- 5th Order: Grand Conservatory / Additional administrative order

Ancient and Accepted Scottish Rite Developed through several stages:

- Initial formation in Charleston, South Carolina (1801)
- Expansion to France (1804)
- Global spread throughout the 19th century

=== Modern Period (1800–Present) ===
The 19th and 20th centuries saw:

- Standardization of ritual practices
- Development of research lodges
- Creation of governing bodies for higher degrees
- Revival of interest in esoteric aspects of higher degrees

==== Contemporary Organization ====
Modern Masonic degrees are typically organized under different governing bodies:

- Blue/Craft Lodges (first three degrees) under Grand Lodges
- Scottish Rite bodies under Supreme Councils
- York Rite bodies under state/national organizations
- Independent orders maintaining their own degree systems

== Practice ==
In most systems, Lodges that practice the "high degrees" are distinct from the lodges of the first three degrees. They have different names, varying depending on the degrees they confer, but are also referred to under the generic term "higher lodges" or "lodges of perfection." In general, these lodges are organized separately from the obediences (grand lodges or grand orients) that federate the lodges of the first three degrees.

== High degrees according to the rites ==
=== Rectified Scottish Rite ===
Green Lodges:

- Lodges of Saint Andrew (Green Lodges):
- Scottish Master

Inner Order:

- Novice Squire
- Chevalier bienfaisant de la Cité sainte (known as 'Knight CBCS')

Secret Class:

- Profès
- Grand Profès

=== French Rite ===
According to the Manuscrit R.C. de la bibliothèque Doré from 1786, the Manuscrit de Moûtiers and the Montaleau’s manuscript of 1787 and the 1801 Regulator of Masonic Knights:

Orders

- 1st Order: Elected Master / Elect
- 2nd Order: Grand Élu / Grand Scottish Elected / Écossais
- 3rd Order: Knight of Masonry / Knight of the Orient
- 4th Order: Perfect Sovereign Mason / Sovereign Prince Rose-Croix, Perfect Free Mason.

Conservaroty

- 5th Order: Administrative and Conservatory Order.

Note: The French Rite insisted that these be called Order and not degrees, for they viewed the Third degree as the highest and ultimate degree.

=== Ancient and Accepted Scottish Rite ===
The degrees of the Ancient and Accepted Scottish Rite vary from one jurisdiction to the next. The Northern Masonic Jurisdiction and Southern Jurisdiction, each have their own lists of degrees, as well as Scottish Rite jurisdictions in France, Canada, England and Wales.

Degree	Northern Jurisdiction (NMJ)	Southern Jurisdiction (SJ)
Craft Lodge (1°-3°)
1°	Entered Apprentice	
2°	Fellow Craft	
3°	Master Mason	
Lodge of Perfection (4°-14°)
4°	Builder	Secret Master
5°	Perfect Master	
6°	Master of the Brazen Serpent	Intimate Secretary
7°	Provost and Judge	
8°	Intendant of the Building	
9°	Master of the Temple	Elu of the Nine
10°	Master Elect	Elu of the Fifteen
11°	Sublime Master Elected	Elu of the Twelve
12°	Master of Mercy	Master Architect
13°	Master of the Ninth Arch	Royal Arch of Solomon
14°	Grand Elect Mason	Perfect Elu
Council of Princes of Jerusalem (NMJ 15°-16°) Chapter of Rose Croix (SJ 15°-18°) - (NMJ 17°-18°)
15°	Knight of the East	
16°	Prince of Jerusalem	
17°	Knight of the East and West	
18°	Knight of the Rose Croix of H.R.D.M.	Knight Rose Croix
Council of Kadosh (SJ 19°-30°) Consistory (SJ 31°-32°) - (NMJ 19°-32°)
19°	Brother of the Trail	Grand Pontiff
20°	Master ad Vitam	Master of the Symbolic Lodge
21°	Patriarch Noachite	Noachite
22°	Prince of Libanus	Knight of the Royal Axe
23°	Knight of Valor	Chief of the Tabernacle
24°	Brother of the Forest	Prince of the Tabernacle
25°	Master of Achievement	Knight of the Brazen Serpent
26°	Friend and Brother Eternal	Prince of Mercy
27°	Knight of Jerusalem	Knight of the Sun
28°	Knight of the Sun	Knight Commander of the Temple
29°	Knight of Saint Andrew	Scottish Knight of Saint Andrew
30°	Grand Inspector	Knight Kadosh
31°	My Brother's Keeper	Inspector Inquisitor
32°	Sublime Prince of the Royal Secret	Master of the Royal Secret
Supreme Council (33°)
33°	Inspector General (Honorary); Sovereign Grand Inspector General (Active)	

=== Egyptian Masonic Rites ===
Lodges of Perfection:

- 4th Secret Master
- 5th Perfect Master
- 6th Intimate Secretary
- 7th Provost and Judge
- 8th Superintendent of Buildings
- 9th Elected Master of the Nine
- 10th Illustrious Elected of the Fifteen
- 11th Sublime Elected Knight
- 12th Grand Master Architect
- 13th Royal Arch
- 14th Grand Elected of the Sacred Vault, also known as Jacques VI or Sublime Mason

Chapters:

- 15th Knight of the East or of the Sword
- 16th Prince of Jerusalem
- 17th Knight of the East and West
- 18th Sublime Prince Rose-Croix

Senates:

- 19th Grand Pontiff or Sublime Scottish of the Celestial Jerusalem
- 20th Knight of the Temple
- 21st Noachite or Prussian Knight
- 22nd Knight of the Royal Arch or Prince of Lebanon
- 23rd Chief of the Tabernacle
- 24th Prince of the Tabernacle
- 25th Knight of the Brazen Serpent
- 26th Trinitarian Scottish or Prince of Mercy
- 27th Sovereign Commander of the Temple
- 28th Knight of the Sun or Adequate Prince
- 29th Grand Scottish of Saint Andrew of Scotland, Prince of Light

Areopaguses and Tribunals:

- 30th Grand Elected Knight Kadosch, also known as Knight of the White and Black Eagle
- 31st Grand Inquisitor Commander
- 32nd Sublime Prince of the Royal Secret
- 33rd Sovereign Grand Inspector General

Grand Consistories:

- 34th Knight of Scandinavia
- 35th Sublime Commander of the Temple
- 36th Sublime Negotiate
- 37th Knight of Shota (Adept of Truth)
- 38th Sublime Elected of Truth
- 39th Grand Elected of Eons
- 40th Sage Sivaist (Perfect Sage)
- 41st Knight of the Rainbow
- 42nd Prince of Light
- 43rd Sublime Hermetic Sage
- 44th Prince of the Zodiac
- 45th Sublime Sage of the Mysteries
- 46th Sublime Shepherd of the Huts
- 47th Knight of the Seven Stars
- 48th Sublime Guardian of the Sacred Mount
- 49th Sublime Sage of the Pyramids
- 50th Sublime Philosopher of Samothrace
- 51st Sublime Titan of the Caucasus
- 52nd Sage of the Labyrinth
- 53rd Knight of the Phoenix
- 54th Sublime Scalde
- 55th Sublime Orphic Doctor
- 56th Pontiff of Cadmea
- 57th Sublime Mage
- 58th Brahmin Prince
- 59th Grand Pontiff of Ogygia
- 60th Sublime Guardian of the Three Fires
- 61st Sublime Unknown Philosopher
- 62nd Sublime Sage of Eleusis
- 63rd Sublime Kawi
- 64th Sage of Mithra
- 65th Patriarch Grand Installer
- 66th Patriarch Grand Consecrator
- 67th Patriarch Grand Eulogist
- 68th Patriarch of Truth
- 69th Knight of the Golden Bough of Eleusis
- 70th Patriarch of the Planispheres
- 71st Patriarch of the Sacred Vedas

Grand Councils:

- 72nd Sublime Master of Wisdom
- 73rd Doctor of the Sacred Fire
- 74th Sublime Master of the Sloka
- 75th Knight of the Libyan Chain
- 76th Patriarch of Isis
- 77th Sublime Theosophical Knight
- 78th Grand Pontiff of Thebes
- 79th Knight of the Dreadful Sadah
- 80th Sublime Elected of the Sanctuary
- 81st Patriarch of Memphis
- 82nd Grand Elected of the Temple of Midgard
- 83rd Sublime Knight of the Valley of Oddy
- 84th Doctor of the Izeds
- 85th Sublime Master of the Luminous Ring
- 86th Pontiff of Serapis
- 87th Sublime Prince of Masonry
- 88th Grand Elected of the Sacred Court
- 89th Patriarch of the Mystic City
- 90th Sublime Patriarch Master of the Great Work

Grand Tribunals:

- 91st Sublime Patriarch Grand Defender of the Order

Grand Mystical Temples:

- 92nd Sublime Cathéchrist
- 93rd Grand Inspector General Regulator
- 94th Sublime Patriarch of Memphis

Sovereign Sanctuaries:

- 95th Sublime Patriarch Grand Conservator of the Order
- 96th Substitute Grand National Master, vice-president of the National Sovereign Sanctuary
- 97th Grand National Master, President of the National Sovereign Sanctuary
- 98th Substitute Grand World Master, vice-president of the International Sovereign Sanctuary
- 99th Most Serene Grand World Master, Grand Hierophant, President of the International Sovereign Sanctuary

=== York Rite ===
Chapter – "Royal Arch"

- Mark Master
- Virtual Past Master
- Most Excellent Master
- Royal Arch Mason

Council – "Cryptic Masonry"

- Royal Master
- Select Master
- Super Excellent Master

Commanderies – "Knights Templar"

- Knight of the Red Cross
- Knight of Malta
- Knight Templar
