= Operative Masonry =

Group of fraternal organizations

Operative Masonry or The Worshipful Society of Free Masons, Rough Masons, Wallers, Slaters, Paviors, Plaisterers and Bricklayers or simply The Operatives is a fraternal guild claiming a history of hundreds of years over which customs, traditions, knowledge and practices were developed and handed down. It is an invitation only, Masonic society dedicated to preserving the history, rituals, and traditions of medieval operative stonemasons guilds in England and Europe that were the precursors to modern speculative Freemasonry.

== History ==
=== Overview ===
The guild arose from the practice of masons over several centuries with traditions and practices passed down. The guild was severely impacted by the United Kingdom Trade Union Act 1871 resulting in unions superseding the operative guild to a degree.

By the early 1900s two people in particular, Clement E. Stretton of Leicester and John Yanker of Manchester took the cause of reviving the guild and ensuring practices did not become extinct.

Stretton lived long enough to pass information to John Carr and a Lodge was formed in London in the mid 1910s enabling the traditions of the guild to be preserved.

Operative assemblies have since been formed in several countries.

=== Origins and early history according to English Operatives Masons ===
The origins of Operative Masons can be traced to the stonemasons guilds that constructed castles, cathedrals, churches, abbeys, bridges and other major buildings in England, Scotland, France and across Europe during the Middle Ages. These operative masons developed initiatory rituals and secret practices to protect their professional trade secrets and distinguish their stonework from inferior masonry.

The earliest known written Masonic constitutions, the Old Charges or Gothic Constitutions, date from the 14th century and enumerate the social and moral standards to which stonemasons were held. They also contained instructions for the initiation of new members to the guild. The Regius Manuscript from c. 1390 speaks of "words and signs" that served as modes of recognition between skilled masons.

As early as the 10th century, a Grand Assemblage of operative masons was held in York, reputedly under the royal patronage of King Athelstan. This gathering brought together stonemasons from across Britain to regulate their trade. Further mention of a General Assembly of masons in York comes from a 14th century manuscript.

The trade of stonemasonry declined after the Gothic period of cathedral building and plague outbreaks in Britain. Although some operative lodges remained, their numbers dwindled. The London Company of Freemen Masons received a royal charter in 1477 and the Scottish Lodge of Edinburgh obtained its charter in 1598.

In the 17th century, honorary non-stonemason members were increasingly admitted to lodges in Scotland and England, eventually outnumbering the operative masons. These speculative masons included gentry, nobility, scientists, clergy and military officers. The first documented speculative initiations include John Boswell, Laird of Auchinleck, in 1600 at the Edinburgh Lodge and Elias Ashmole in 1646 at a Warrington lodge.

=== Revival of Operative Masonry ===
During the 18th and 19th centuries, operative masonry entered a period of steep decline as architectural styles and building technologies changed. By the early 20th century, only a few functioning lodges remained in England and Scotland.

In the early 1900s, several surviving operative lodges in the York Division sought to preserve their traditional history and rituals before they were lost forever. Under the authority of the York Division, members including Clement Edwin Stretton reconstituted an assemblage in London under the name "Channel Row Assemblage" in 1913.

Stretton was initiated into an operative lodge in Derbyshire in 1866 and became a passionate advocate for reviving operative masonry over his lifetime.[15] The new assemblage set about collecting old operative rituals and research to recreate the workings of medieval masons. In 1915, it adopted the current name, the Worshipful Society of Free Masons.

The Operative Masons underwent a prolonged decline during the world wars but experienced a revival in the 1960s and growth in international membership. The society now has over 100 Assemblages across the world.

=== Organization and leadership ===
The Worshipful Society is governed by a Grand Assemblage based in London and led by Three Grand Master Masons. The Grand Assemblages formerly met annually but now occur less regularly due to the society's geographic expansion.

For administrative purposes, the society is divided into regional jurisdictions known as Divisions, echoing the division of medieval masons into lodges based on geographical area. Each Division is overseen by a Deputy Grand Master Mason who serves as the personal representative of the Three Grand Master Masons.

Individual Assemblages, equivalent to a Masonic lodge, are led by a Deputy Master Mason who presides over the induction of new members. An assemblage combines the first four degrees of the society. Higher degrees are conferred at regional meetings.

The society does not have a system of Grand Rank or Past Rank. Members carry titles associated with their current office or degree, relinquishing the title when they retire from the position.

=== Membership and degrees ===
Membership in the Operative Masons is open by invitation only to Master Masons, Royal Arch Masons and Mark Master Masons in good standing under a recognized Masonic constitution. Candidates must be voted on unanimously by assemblage members.

The Operative Masons have seven degrees of membership which are believed to be the origins of the three degrees of Craft Masonry and the later Masonic orders of the Holy Royal Arch and Mark Master Masons. The degrees are:

- 1st – Indentured Apprentice
- 2nd – Fellow of the Craft
- 3rd – Fitter and Marker
- 4th – Setter Erector
- 5th – Intendent, Overseer, Superintendent and Warden
- 6th – Passed Master
- 7th – Master Mason and Grand Master Honoris Causa

A minimum period of active membership is required between progression through the lower degrees. Advancement to Passed Master requires having served as Master of a Craft lodge and Mark Master lodge. The degree of Grand Master Mason is strictly limited and conferred solely at the discretion of the Three Grand Master Masons.

=== Ritual and symbolism ===
The rituals and symbolism of the Operative Masons are centered on the tools, techniques, customs and oral traditions of medieval operative stonemasons guilds.

The lodge room layout is reversed from typical speculative Freemasonry, with the Master's position in the West instead of the East. Leadership chairs relate to different vantage points for observing the position of the sun throughout the day. Initiation into the first degree involves symbolic tests of an operative mason's skill, such as dressing a rough ashlar stone. The candidate takes his obligation kneeling on an ashler with his bare knees. He is presented with actual operative masonry tools like chisels and mallets, rather than the speculative symbolic tools.

Lectures and charges focus on the construction of King Solomon's Temple, but from an operative standpoint. The second degree reenacts the positioning of foundation stones. The third and fourth degrees simulate the measuring, cutting, marking and raised placement of stones, echoing operative methods.

A unique aspect is the annual Ancient Drama depicting the death of Hiram Abiff, adapted from the medieval legend of the martyred master mason of the Temple. This serves as the retirement ceremony for the outgoing Third Grand Master Mason. Signs and passwords derived from operative practice are also featured. The intimate tie to stonemasons guilds distinguishes the Operative Masons from strictly speculative Freemasonry.

=== Relationship to Speculative Freemasonry ===
According to the Operatives, The Worshipful Society served as a direct model and inspiration for the ritual structure adopted by speculative Freemasonry in the late 17th and early 18th centuries. The two fraternal orders remain closely intertwined through their use of initiation rituals, symbolism, moral charges and mythological legends surrounding Temple construction.

Some researchers, such as Operative Mason C. E. Stretton, argue that Freemasonry hijacked and appropriated Operative rituals during its transition in 1717 without due credit or acknowledgement. Others maintain the two traditions evolved together through mutual exchange and acknowledge their intimate bonds.

For modern Freemasons, the Operative Masons provide a living link to the medieval stonemasons guilds from which speculative Masonry emerged. The society's rituals and practices aim to preserve these ancient technical elements as a record for Freemasonry.

Membership in the Operative tradition is seen as complementing and enriching involvement in Craft Lodge, Royal Arch and Mark Masonry by providing the operative origins to speculative Masonry's symbolic teachings.

== See also ==
- Freemasonry
- Guild
- Masonic bodies
- History of Freemasonry
- Masonic ritual and symbolism
- Stonemasonry
