= Ancient and Accepted Scottish Rite Temple =

- U.S. National Register of Historic Places
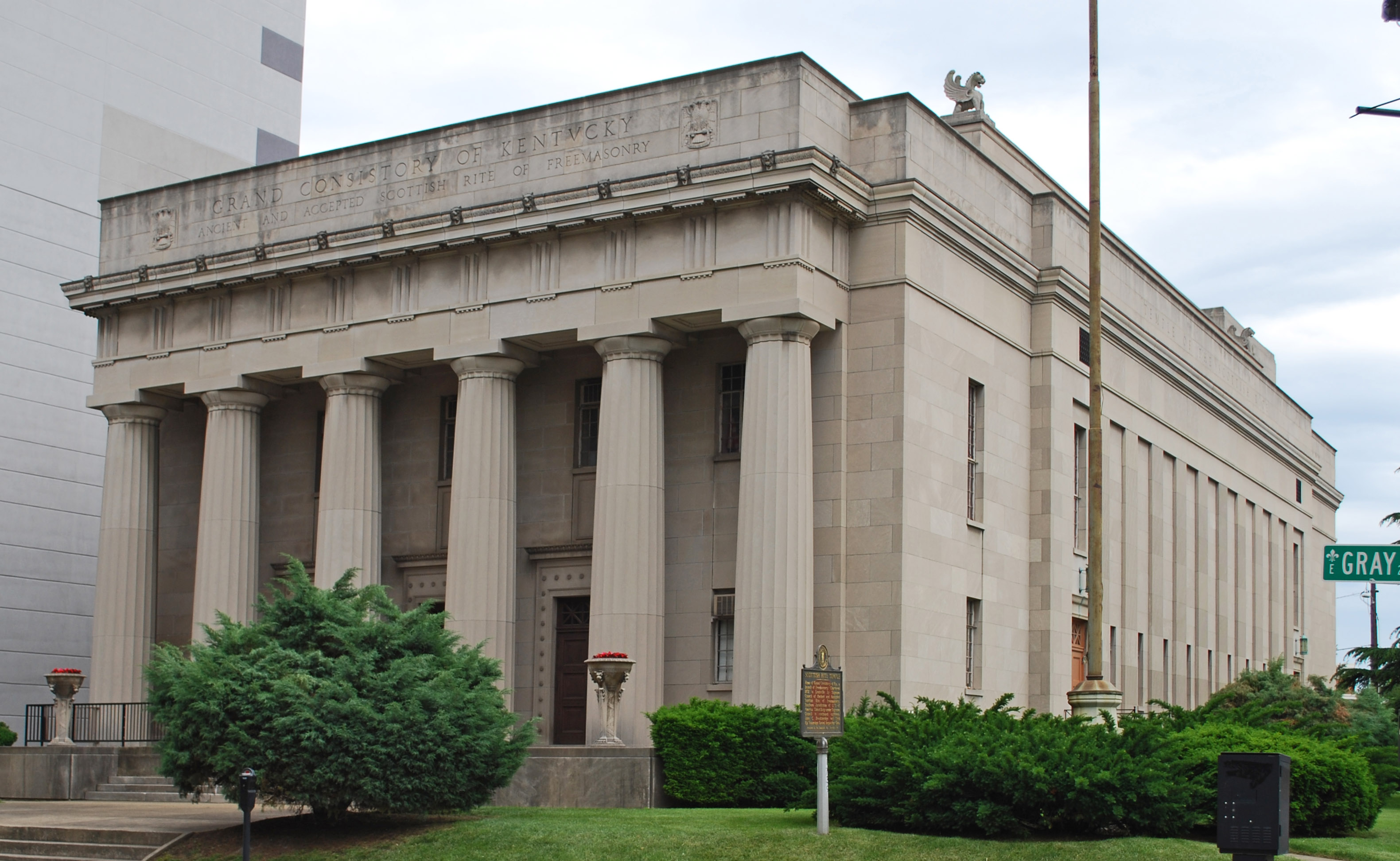

- Location within Kentucky Location within the United States
- Location: 200 E. Gray St., Louisville, Kentucky
- Coordinates: 38°14′48″N 85°45′46″W
- Area: less than one acre
- Built: 1930–31
- Architect: Nevin, Wischmneyer & Morgan; Bornstein, Ale
- Architectural style: Classical Revival
- NRHP reference No.: 82002705
- Added to NRHP: April 29, 1982

The Ancient and Accepted Scottish Rite Temple in Louisville, Kentucky, also known as the Scottish Rite Temple, is a building completed in 1931. It was listed on the National Register of Historic Places in 1982.

It was deemed "an important example of the pure Neo-classical Revival style. Both the interior and exterior are unaltered and, as such, the building represents one of the finest examples of its type in Louisville."

== See also ==
- National Register of Historic Places listings in Downtown Louisville, Kentucky
