= Grande Oriente do Brasil =

Masonic body in Brazil

The Grande Oriente do Brasil is a masonic body in Brazil. It was founded in 1822. It has 1700 lodges with around 100,000 members. It is within the tradition of Anglo-American Freemasonry.
