= Cooperman =

Cooperman is a surname. Notable people with the surname include:

- Alan Cooperman, director of religion research at the Pew Research Center
- Alvin Cooperman (1923–2006), television producer and an entertainment executive
- Arthur J. Cooperman, New York State Supreme Court Justice
- Bernard Dov Cooperman (born 1946), Louis L. Kaplan Associate Professor of Jewish History at the University of Maryland
- Hasye Cooperman (1907–1992), American Yiddish poet and academic
- Jim Cooperman, American Canadian author and conservationist
- Kahane Cooperman (born 1965), American documentary filmmaker and television producer
- Leon G. Cooperman, the billionaire chairman and CEO of Omega Advisors
- Matthew Cooperman, American poet, critic and editor
- Ralph Cooperman (1927–2009), British Olympic fencer
- Stanley Cooperman (1929–1976), New York City-born poet
- Tommy Cooperman of Breathe Carolina, an American electronic music duo from Denver, Colorado

== See also ==
- Cooper (disambiguation)
- Copeman
- Coppermine (disambiguation)
- Kupperman
