= Dylan Besseau =

French director, writer and producer (born 1997)

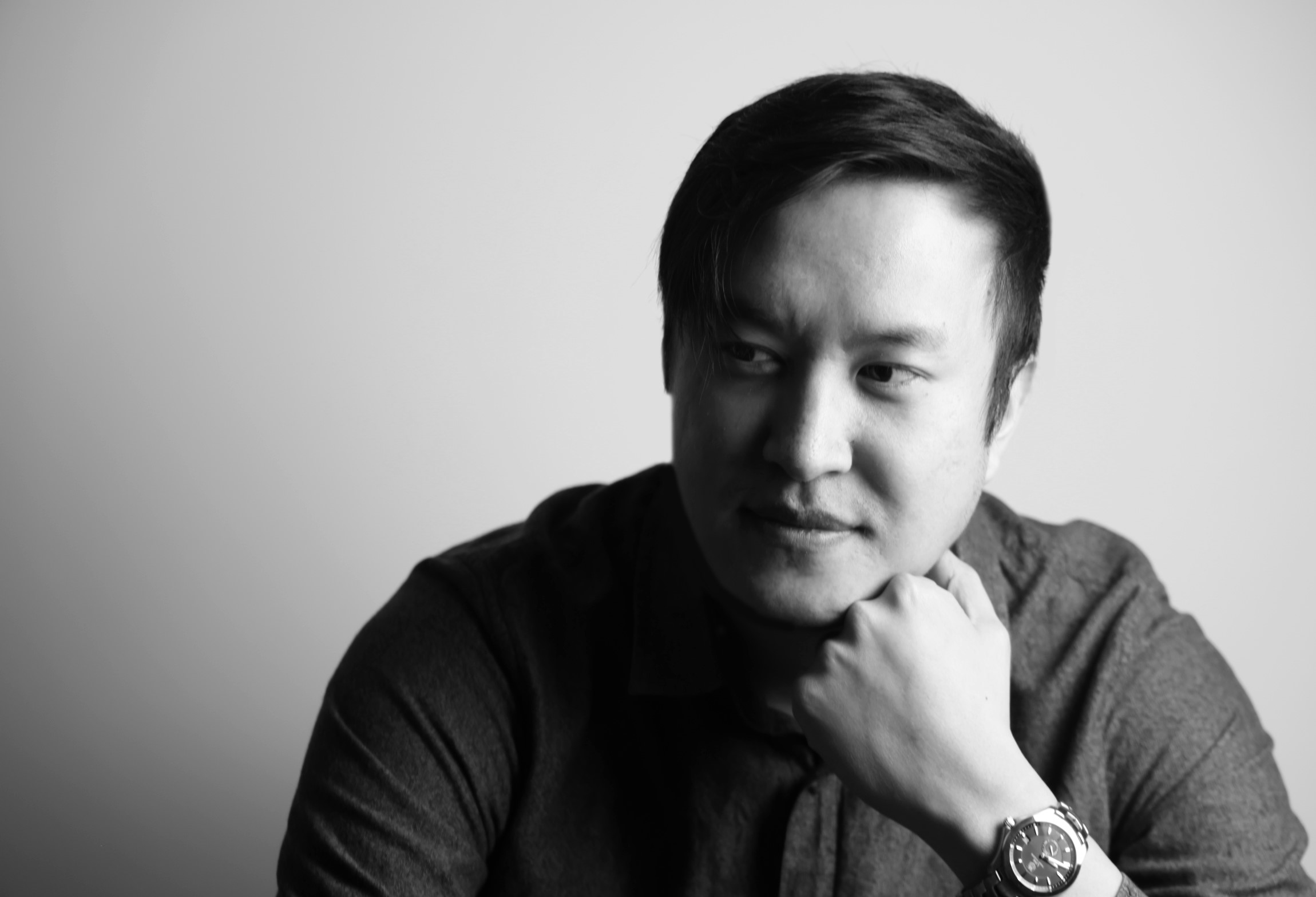
- Born: Dylan Besseau; September 15, 1997 (age 28); Vietnam
- Education: Institution Saint-Gabriel/Saint-Michel
- Occupations: film director, film producer
- Years active: 2019–present
- Notable work: La légende de Thierry Mauvignier, The Venus Chained
- Movement: minimalist film
- Awards: Honorable Mention at Student World Impact Film Festival 2023

Dylan Besseau (born September 15, 1997) is a French filmmaker and producer, who was born in Vietnam.

== Education ==
He was educated at the private Catholic institution Saint-Gabriel/Saint-Michel in the commune of Saint-Laurent-sur-Sèvre. He obtained his general baccalaureate ES at a private high school of Brittany in 2014. Then, he began a university course at the faculty of law in Nantes in 2015, but later decided to change direction and pursue cinema after discovering the film The Handmaiden and developed an interest in minimalist film.

== Career ==
In 2018, he studied at an art school. The same year, he completed audiovisual internships in various associations, where he carried out some projects in co-production with France 3 Pays de la Loire. He directed the short film The Sozo Girl and Happiness based on the song Like a Blooming Season in collaboration with Shin Hae Gyeong.
In 2021, he created the audiovisual agency Artwooks Media and directed the feature-length documentary La légende de Thierry Mauvignier about the director Thierry Mauvignier.

The film was noted for its reflection of an internal conflict between commissioned objectives and personal artistic expression :

Seems to share with us, nonetheless, a question that he appears to carry finding his more personal voice through a prescribed exercise, one in which he doesn't seem entirely comfortable or in agreement. The result, in any case, reflects this internal conflict, as the film grapples with two conflicting aspirations: the commissioned, marketing-driven objective and the desire of a young filmmaker attempting to bring forth his unique perspective.

— Reported by Frédéric Rougeot

In 2022, he founded the Wooksart Foundation, a charitable audiovisual association.
In 2023, he produced the documentary The Venus Chained which won the honorable mention at the SWIFF 2023. Then, he directed the documentary Anne Bouillon : Justice for women with the French lawyer Anne Bouillon This film will be selected at the Justice Documentary Festival.
In 2024, he directed the film Gevart "a film delicately representing a tutelary figure of a doctor" according to Bande à part.

In 2026, he produced the documentary Makiko on Makiko Furuichi. According to an interview published in The Movie Buff, the film was directed with Antoine Godet and produced on a budget of $40,000.

== Filmography ==
Year	Title	Role	Notes
2019	Happiness.	Director	Short film
2019	Dreamhour - Better Friends	Director	Short film
2021	La légende de Thierry Mauvignier	Director	Feature film with Yannick Jaulin
2022	The Sozo Girl	Director	Short film
2023	Castle's Light	Director	Short film
2023	Anne Bouillon : Justice for women	Director	Medium-length film
2023	The Venus Chained	Producer	Medium-length film
2024	Gevart	Director	Medium-length film
2026	Makiko	Producer	Feature film with Yuichi Yokoyama

== Distinctions ==
- 2022 : Official Selection at The Paus Premiers Festival
- 2023 : Official Selection at Justice Documentary Festival Paris
- 2023 : Honorable Mention at Student World Impact Film Festival
