= La Chaîne d'Union =

French Masonic Magazine

- Type: Specialized press Freemasonry
- Owner: Grand Orient de France
- Publisher: Conform édition (delegate)
- Editor-in-chief: Pierre Mollier
- Editor: Jean Michel Garat
- Founded: 1864
- Language: French
- City: Paris
- Country: France
- ISSN: 0292-8000

La Chaîne d'Union is the quarterly journal of masonic, philosophical, and symbolic studies of the Grand Orient de France. Founded in London in 1864 by exiled French Freemasons fleeing the authoritarian regime of Napoleon III, it celebrates its 150th year of existence in 2015. While remaining close to the liberal and adogmatic conception of Freemasonry, its editorial line has evolved over the years. Its name refers to the symbolic Chain of Union formed by Freemasons at the end of their Masonic garb. Despite several interruptions in its distribution, it remains the oldest Masonic magazine still in publication in 2015. Its editorial board is made up of brothers and sisters from various French obediences.

== History ==
=== 1864-1869: birth in London and 1st distribution ===
The Masonic magazine La Chaîne d'Union was born of a project conceived by brothers Prosper Simard and François Tafety, Freemasons living in exile in London and opposed to Napoleon III during the regime's “authoritarian” period. The choice of title, which is not attributed, refers to the symbolic chain of union formed by Freemasons at the end of their outfits, representing the union of past, present, and future Masons. The magazine's founders relied on a structure outside the Masonic lodge to implement what was initially a liaison bulletin for exiles in London, particularly entrepreneurs, with the ambition of publishing two issues a month. Called the “Bureau de Renseignements,” this structure also acted as an administrative support office.

The first issue appeared on September 15, 1864, in a four-page tabloid format. It bears the title La Chaîne d'Union and the subtitle Journal de la maçonnerie universelle. It was published without illustrations and featured the ternary motto “Science, Work, Solidarity” at the top of the page. One page is devoted to advertising, while a fifth, interspersed page is entitled “Supplément de La Chaîne d'Union” and tells the story of a particular lodge. The first editorial is by Brother François Tafety, entitled “Notre programme lyrique” (“Our lyrical program”).

As early as the second issue, an unsigned article entitled “The Bible and Masonry” reports on a dispute between a lodge of the Supreme Council of France and the United Grand Lodge of England, which is accused of being a “branch of the Church.” Open to all rites as an organ of “universal masonry,” the magazine nevertheless displays a certain anti-clericalism. Its editors established relations and maintained correspondence with several famous personalities, including Victor Hugo and Giuseppe Garibaldi, Grand Master of the Grand Orient of Italy, who openly supported the publication.

From 1864 to 1868, the magazine was published regularly, with numerous articles devoted to French and foreign Freemasonry, as well as critical reviews of competing Masonic publications, such as the English magazine The Fremason's Magazine, funeral tributes, including that of Pierre-Joseph Proudhon, and articles on the history of lodges, such as the Grand Loge des Philadelphes, to which the journal's editors belong. Issue 46 of 1866 marked the end of the link between the “Bureau des renseignements” and the magazine. The magazine's offices moved twice, in line with changes in ownership, to settle in Camden in April 1868.

Issue no. 85, dated May 1, 1868, announced the death of François Taféty, the magazine's first editorialist and now its sole owner. Publishing was briefly taken over by two other founders, merchants by trade, the Clève brothers, and Nancy. After their death, however, the magazine's dynamism faded, and the last London edition appeared on May 15, 1869, under number 108.

=== 1869-1889: taken over by Esprit-Eugène Hubert and moved to Paris ===
Its correspondent in France, Esprit-Eugène Hubert, took over La Chaîne d'Union as director and editor-in-chief. After five years in London, the magazine was republished in Paris on June 1, 1869, in octavo format, under the title La Chaîne d'Union de Paris. Unlike the London edition, it faced stiff competition, encouraged by the liberalism of Napoleon III's regime at a time when Freemasonry in general was often public. The publication became fortnightly. Under Hubert's direction, it remained independent of the obediences, and displayed its republican sympathies, but opposed the reform of rituals and the abandonment of the obligation to believe in God in 1878 and 1879.

The Commune and the siege of Paris interrupted broadcasting on September 15, 1870. It resumed after the Versaillais victory. Intended to be “humanitarian and patriotic”, the magazine remained as consensual as possible, to open up to a maximum number of readers of all denominations and from all countries. It also reports, faithfully and in detail, on the main events in French Masonic life, information on the development of para-Masonic solidarity associations, obituaries of key figures in Freemasonry, and book reviews. There is also a section on anti-Masonicism, with information on writings that regularly attack it, such as those by Édouard Drumont, who accuses it of being an agent of the Zionists in his book La France juive.

After twenty years of publishing, during which he maintained the magazine as the Journal of Universal Masonry), and after having enjoyed a worldwide subscriber base and recognized international prestige, (Note: Including, in England, for opposing the abandonment of the invocation of the Great Architect of the Universe.) and having remained independent and assertive in his convictions, Esprit-Eugene Hubert, at the age of eighty, put an end to its publication in 1889.

=== 1934-1963: publishing revival, the Gloton years ===
Virgile Athanase Gloton, a Freemason who opened a bookshop and masonic decorating business opposite the Hôtel du Grand Orient de France in 1910, was behind the revival of the magazine, which had disappeared in 1889, and bought back the title. In this family business, his son Edmond Gloton was the driving force behind the republication in a difficult economic and political context, where the fallout from the Great Depression of 1929 and the activities of far-right leagues made the venture more complex. Despite this, the publication was revived under the subtitle Revue mensuelle de documentation et d'informations maçonniques (Monthly magazine of Masonic documentation and information). It became a monthly magazine, with ten issues per year and a white cover. Lettering and illustrations, partly by Henry Tattegrain, were added to the editions. Distribution was restricted to Freemasons, who could only purchase the magazine if they could prove their membership. The magazine also served as an advertising medium for the family business.

Edmond Gloton's intense Masonic activity (Note: Edmond Gloton belonged to several obediences, including the Ligue universelle des francs-maçons in Geneva.) contributed to the magazine's wide circulation. On the death of his father, he took over the management of the company, but with the outbreak of the Second World War in 1939, the store and publishing facilities were closed. On April 1, 1945, the magazine reappeared for a new series. This 50-page series enjoyed a flourishing period, offering readers Masonic biographies, articles on history, symbolism, morality or philosophy, on Masonic rites, obediences, or women's Freemasonry. It also regularly features columns on “societal” subjects. Ancillary sections, including obituaries, informative notes, and reports on obedient convents, sometimes in a playful vein, complete the publication. During this period, the magazine remained “generalist” and inter-obedient, adapting to the different Masonic sensibilities of the time. Its readership was mainly in France (Note: Particularly in Paris, where many subscribers have their address in the 9th arrondissement.) and its colonies, but also in Belgium and Switzerland.

Edmond Gloton died in February 1962. His daughter Denise continued publishing the magazine, bringing out another thirteen issues before giving it up for economic and family reasons. Publication of La Chaîne d'Union was interrupted again in June 1963.

=== 1981-1996: new edition, the Grand Orient de France ===
After its publication ceased in 1963, the magazine reappeared in 1981, when Denise Gloton launched a new edition. Under her direction, an editorial team designed a new layout, which was then published by a new publisher. The content remained very similar to that of Edmond Gloton's editions, while winning back the old readership through innovations aimed at new readers, such as the addition of two supplements whose subjects were more specifically aimed at Compagnons and Maitres Franc-Maitçons, and were only issued with proof of membership. The magazine continues to be independent of all obediences, but unlike previous editions, it becomes quarterly, while continuing to show diversity in the subjects covered. The publication lasted only two years and was discontinued again in 1982 after eight issues. Following difficulties with the publisher, Denise Gloton ceased her collaboration with the magazine and put an end to its distribution.

In 1984, Paul-Henri Gourdot, Grand Master of the Grand Orient de France, asked Denise Gloton to integrate and republish La Chaîne d'Union through Éditions maçonniques de France (EDIMAF), (Note: Publishing house of the Grand Orient de France.) joining the other publications already distributed by the GODF: the Humanisme magazine, dealing mainly with social issues, and Chroniques d'histoire maçonnique. The aim was to complete the range of publications with a magazine focusing on symbolism and philosophy, in collaboration with the Institut d'études et de recherches maçonniques (IDERM). The magazine was integrated and became La Revue d'études maçonniques, philosophiques et symboliques du Grand Orient de France. Its publication remains quarterly, and its format is unchanged. With a new editorial team headed by Denise Gloton, the focus was on symbolism and masonic research. Regularly published until 1996, the magazine expanded, with several successive editors, (Note: The grand master is usually the publishing director.) and several editors-in-chief who continued to lead an editorial and reading committee on its main subjects.

=== 1997-2000: modernization and professionalization ===
1997 marked a new stage in the life of the magazine. Pierre Mollier took over as managing editor and set about revitalizing the magazine's content, enriching it with specific themes that deepened symbolic and philosophical research. Various points of view were adopted. The cover was given a new color and the layout was redesigned to suit a more contemporary style of communication. IDERM is no longer involved, and the numbering of this new edition starts from number one. The editorial board remains virtually unchanged, but a professional journalist, René Le Moal, has joined the team. In its new form, the magazine was a resounding success, joining the select group of reference magazines dealing with Masonic symbolism. In 2000, René Le Moal succeeded Pierre Mollier as editor-in-chief. In the years that followed, he continued to develop the magazine's readership and the diversity of Masonic subjects covered.

=== 2000-2022: the philosophical and symbolist magazine of the Grand Orient de France ===
La Chaîne d'Union became the philosophical and symbolic magazine of the Grand Orient de France, under the editorial direction of René Le Moal. It became part of a panel of publications specific to the obedience, complementing the magazine Humanisme, devoted to societal reflection, which, according to the obedience's statutes, invites its member Freemasons to become involved citizens with the aim of “materially and morally improving a lot of mankind,” (Note: Article 1 of the constitution of the Grand Orient de France.) and the historical research journal Chronique Histoire maçonnique, which mainly disseminates the work of the Institut d'études et de recherches maçonniques (IDERM). This distribution, within what constitutes a small press group, enables the magazine to devote itself to the symbolic and personal research of Freemasons. The magazine retains an open editorial approach, publishing articles by brothers and sisters from other male, female, or mixed obediences. It regularly opens its columns to contemporary thinkers who are not necessarily Freemasons.

The magazine continues to appear quarterly, with an editorial line covering all subjects relating to the philosophical and initiatory understanding of Freemasonry. Following the closure of Éditions maçonniques de France due to financial difficulties, the Grand Orient chose Conform édition to take over all publishing and distribution of the magazine.

In 2015, the magazine celebrated its 150th anniversary and published an issue retracing its history. Tributes from other Masonic bodies, such as Quatuor Coronati-Bayreuth from the United Grand Lodge of Germany, the magazine Alpina from the Grand Lodge Alpina of Switzerland, Les Cahiers Villard de Honnecourt from the French National Grand Lodge, and the magazine Points de vue initiatiques from the Grande Loge de France, open this special edition. In 2022, the magazine published a special issue for its 100th publication, featuring a primer of authors who wrote articles from 1981 to 2022. The theme of the issue is “Freemasonry, the traditional way and modernity.”

== See also ==
- Freemasonry
- Grande Loge Nationale Française
- Grand Orient de France

== Bibliography ==
- Collectif (2015). "Hors-série : 150 ans d'études maçonniques" [Special issue: 150 years of Masonic studies]. La Chaîne d'Union (in French). 5. Conform édition.
