= Kupferman =

Kupferman is a surname. Notable people with the surname include:

- Fred Kupferman (1934–1988), French historian
- Laurent Kupferman (1966–2025), French essayist and author
- Lawrence Kupferman (1909–1982), American artist
- Meyer Kupferman (1926–2003), American composer and clarinetist
- Moshe Kupferman (1926–2003), Israeli artist
- Orna Kupferman, Israeli computer scientist
- Theodore R. Kupferman (1920–2003), American politician
