= Bande à part =

Bande à part may refer to:

- Bande à part (film), a 1964 film by Jean-Luc Godard
- Bande à Part (album), an album by Nouvelle Vague
- Bande à part (radio station), a French-Canadian music radio station
- Bande à part (magazine), a French film magazine

== See also ==
- A Band Apart, Quentin Tarantino's film production company
