= Copeman =

Copeman is a surname. Notable people with the surname include:

- Constance Copeman (1864–1953), English painter
- Fred Copeman (1907–1983), English volunteer during the Spanish Civil War
- Lloyd Groff Copeman (1881–1956), American inventor
- Peter Copeman FRCS (1932–2018), English dermatologist
- Russell Copeman (born 1960), Canadian politician
- Sydney Copeman (1862–1947), British doctor
- Thomas H. Copeman III, United States Navy officer
- William Copeman (1900–1970), rheumatologist
