= Anne Bouillon =

French lawyer (born 1972)

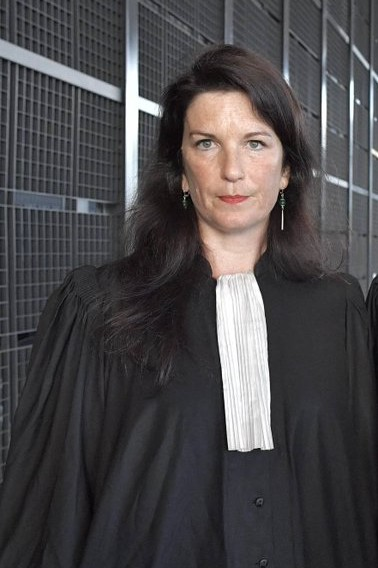
- Born: France
- Occupation: Lawyer
- Known for: Just Charity,Anne Bouillon: Justice for all!

Anne Bouillon is a French lawyer born in 1972 specializing in women's rights. She is registered with the bar of Nantes. According to GQ she was the most powerful lawyer in France in 2019.

== Career ==
Anne Bouillon was sworn in in January 2001 before the Aix-en-Provence Court of Appeal. She began her career in Marseille in immigration and employee law before setting up her own law firm in Nantes in 2003. Her commitment to the defense of women victims of domestic violence, which she made her specialty, and her involvement in feminist associations propelled her to the fore.

In 2019 the mayor of Nantes Johanna Rolland included her on her list in an ineligible position. In 2023, she is cited by Matthieu Aron in his book The great pleadings of the tenors of the bar which relates the trial of Edinson Valejo.

== Family ==
Anne Bouillon is the great-niece of Josephine Baker and her fourth husband, Jo Bouillon, she is also the niece of director Gilles Bouillon and the cousin of actor Bastien Bouillon. She is the mother of a child and married to criminal lawyer Franck Boëzec.

== Associations ==
She participated in the creation of the Citad'elle association in Nantes. She is also a member of the LesFameuses association, an organization bringing together women managers or occupying positions of high responsibility across France. In 2020, she was elected Famer of the Year. In 2023, she will participate in the 250th anniversary of the Grand Orient de France in Nantes as a speaker alongside Georges Sérignac and Pierre Mollier.

== Documentary ==
- 2023: The Venus Chained, directed by Guillaume Gevart
- 2023: Juste Charity, directed by Floriane Devigne
- 2023: Anne Bouillon: Justice for all!, directed by Dylan Besseau
