= Kupperman =

Kupperman or Kuppermann is a surname. Notable people with the surname include:

- Aron Kuppermann (1926–2011), American–Brazilian chemical physicist
- Charles Kupperman (1950– ), US National Security Advisor (former, acting)
- Howard Kupperman (1931–2014), American politician
- Iser Kuperman (1922–2006), draughts player
- Joel J. Kupperman (1936–2020), American professor of philosophy
- Karen Ordahl Kupperman (born 1939), American historian
- Michael Kupperman (born 1966), American cartoonist
- Nathan Kuppermann, American pediatrician
- Robert Kupperman (1935–2006), American government official and academic

== See also ==
- Kupferman, surname
