= Ce que j'appelle oubli =

2011 novel by Laurent Mauvignier

- Author: Laurent Mauvignier
- Language: French
- Genre: Novel
- Publisher: Les Éditions de Minuit
- Publication date: 2011
- Publication place: France
- Media type: Print (Hardback)
- Pages: 64
- ISBN: 9782707321534

Ce que j'appelle oubli (What I call oblivion) is a 2011 novel by Laurent Mauvignier.

== Plot summary ==
The book is constituted of only one huge sentence telling the story of a young man killed by watchmen in a supermarket because he drank one can of beer without paying for it. It is based on a real story which happened in Lyon in December 2009.

It is told as a monologue by a narrator whose identity is not explained but who tell the reader that he knew the dead man and his brother.

== Theatrical adaptations ==
The book was adapted several times on theater, one of them in 2012 by Denis Podalydès for the Comédie-Française. An online representation with the same actor was performed in March 2021 during the closing of the theater due to the COVID-19 pandemic, in the online program named Théâtre à la table.

It has also been adapted for contemporary dance by Angelin Preljocaj in 2013.
