= Peter Copeman =

English dermatologist (1932–2018)

Peter Copeman FRCS
- Born: 9 April 1932; London
- Died: 13 July 2018 (aged 86)
- Education: Eton College, Cambridge University
- Medical career
- Profession: Physician
- Sub-specialties: Dermatology

Peter William Monckton Copeman FRCS (9 April 1932 – 13 July 2018) was an English dermatologist known as "Dr Spot" by his colleagues. He was consultant physician at Westminster Hospital and consulting dermatologist at Chelsea and Westminster Hospital. He treated many celebrities and also helped modernise Qatar’s medical services. He authored over a hundred peer-reviewed articles and pioneered research on allergic vasculitis and melanoma.

Outside medicine, he co-founded the Game Conservancy, where he arranged the regeneration of the British grey partridge.

== Early life ==
Peter Copeman was born in London on 9 April 1932, the son of William Copeman CBE, a pioneering rheumatologist, and his wife Helen. His grandfather was Sydney Copeman who worked on the refinement of Edward Jenner's smallpox vaccine.

He was brought up in Hampstead and educated at Rottingdean Preparatory School in East Sussex, which was evacuated to the Cornish countryside during the Second World War. Subsequently, he attended Eton College, where he demonstrated skill at shooting and during his final year, was captain of the Eton shooting eight at Bisley.

He completed his undergraduate medical studies at the University of Cambridge before gaining admission to St Thomas' Hospital, London, and qualifying in medicine. He was awarded a gold medal for his PhD thesis on vasculitis and was awarded membership of the Royal College of Physicians (RCP), in January 1962 when the pass rate was less than 6%.

== Career ==
Copeman originally planned to work in ophthalmology but transferred to dermatology after he was noticed for writing a paper on styes for The Lancet.

He authored over a hundred peer-reviewed articles and pioneered research on allergic vasculitis. He instituted immunofluorescence and electron microscopy in research in skin disease and paid particular attention to melanoma. Subsequently, he travelled to the Mayo Clinic in Minnesota where he worked alongside Terence Ryan and eminent Dutch dermatologist Rudi Cormane. He later published, with Ryan, a classic paper on "The problems of classification of cutaneous angitis with reference to histopathology and pathogenesis".

In 1965, at a time when leading surgeon Harold Ellis was at Westminster Hospital, Copeman, frequently known as "Dr Spot" by his colleagues, was appointed consultant physician. "He [Copeman] always wore a spotless white coat over a waistcoat and tie, striding the wards with a crocodile of registrars, students and nurses trailing behind."

In the 1970s and 1980s, he helped modernise Qatar's medical services, frequently visiting Qatar as the guest of the Emir. In addition, he had a private practice in Sloane Street.

Between 1991 and 2013, he was the British Association of Dermatologists Willan Librarian.

Until retirement, he was a consulting dermatologist at Chelsea and Westminster Hospital in London and known for treating high profile personalities including Madonna and Diana, Princess of Wales.

== Personal and family ==
In 1973, he married Lindsey Brims, who was 16 years younger and whom he had met at a ball at Sorn Castle, Ayrshire a year earlier. They had four children.

As chairman of the wine committee at the Athenaeum, he persuaded Eduardo Paolozzi to design the club's wine labels.

He had an appreciation for field sports and was a co-founder of the Game Conservancy, which led him to purchase a 200-acre estate in Abshield near Morpeth, Northumberland, in the 1980s, where he arranged the regeneration of the British grey partridge. The resulting re-landscaping, wildlife corridor hedgerows and several ponds were acknowledged in the finals of the Laurent-Perrier conservation awards, which ran annually by Laurent-Perrier Champagne (UK) Ltd between 1986 and 1998, and was subsequently taken over by James Purdey & Sons.

== Death ==
Copeman died due to a series of strokes.

== Selected publications ==
- "The Problems of Classification of Cutaneous Angitis with Reference to Histopathology and Pathogenesis", British Journal of Dermatology, Vol. 82, Supplement 5 (May 1970). (With T. J. Ryan) doi:10.1111/j.1365-2133.1970.tb07983.x
- "Investigations into the Pathogenesis of Acute Cutaneous Angitis", British Journal of Dermatology, Vol. 82, Supplement 5 (May 1970), pp. 51–65. doi:10.1111/j.1365-2133.1970.tb07989.x
- "Immunofluorescence of Cutaneous Vasculitis Associated With Systemic Disease", Archives of Dermatology, Vol. 104 (1971), No. 3, pp. 254–259. (With Arnold L. Schroeter and Robert E. Jordon) doi:10.1001/archderm.1971.04000210028005
- "Beekeepers' dermatitis: contact allergy to beeswax, beesglue (propolis) and Royal Jelly", British Journal of Dermatology, Vol. 109, Issue S24 (July 1983), p. 97. (With J. I. Harper) doi:10.1111/j.1365-2133.1983.tb15373.x
