= Yannick Jaulin =

French actor (born 1958)

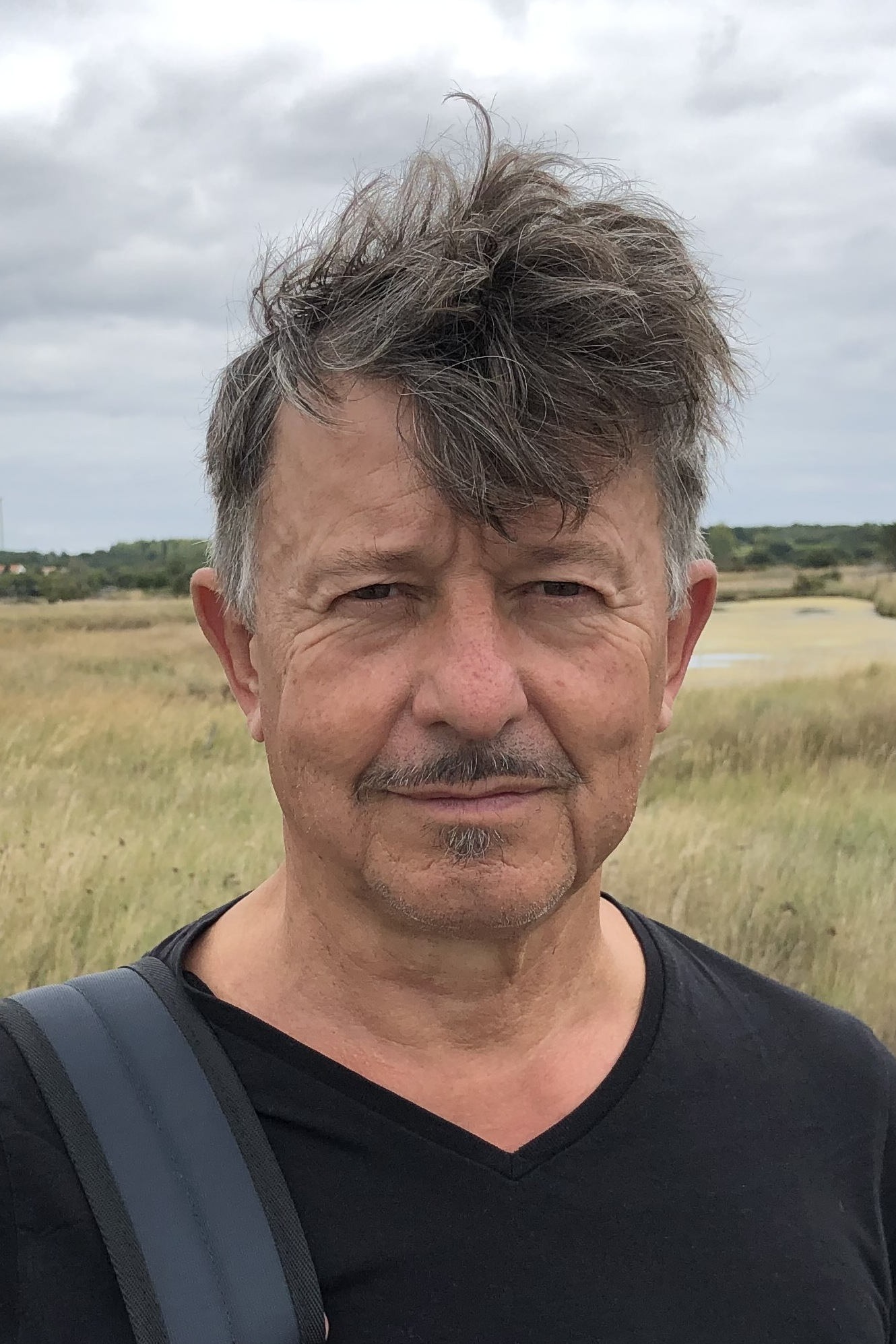
- Jaulin in 2021
- Born: July 30, 1958 (age 67); Aubigny, Vendée, France
- Occupations: Actor, storyteller
- Known for: Oral literature, contemporary storytelling in France
- Awards: Chevalier of Arts and Letters (2005); Chevalier of the Legion of Honour (2013)

Yannick Jaulin (born July 30, 1958) is a French storyteller, actor, and playwright. He was born in Aubigny, Vendée, France. He is also described as a diseur (a speaker-performer in the oral tradition), singer, and humorist.

== Biography ==
=== Early life ===
Yannick Jaulin is originally from the Vendée department in western France. From an early age, he was immersed in parlanjhe, also known as Poitevin-Saintongeais, a Gallo-Romance language (similar to Gallo and Picard), often referred to colloquially as a patois.

=== Order of the Solar Temple ===
Jaulin was a member of the Order of the Solar Temple, a religious group, commonly called a cult, notorious for committing mass suicide in the 1990s. He and his partner left about a year before the mass suicides occurred. He spoke publicly about this period of his life in an episode of the Canal+ investigative program Spécial Investigation broadcast in December 2012.

In 2022, Jaulin revisited his years in the cult as a former follower in the documentary series La Secte. He also appeared on the morning program of France Inter, interviewed by Sonia Devillers.

== Filmography ==
- Tartuffe ou l’Hypocrite, by Molière, directed by Matthieu Roy (2022)
- Forests, by Wajdi Mouawad (2006)
- Louise-Michel, directed by Gustave Kervern and Benoît Delépine (2008)
- La Légende des seigneurs assassins, directed by Thierry Mauvignier (2021)

== Bibliography ==
- J’ai pas fermé l’œil de la nuit
- Il était une fois J'ai pas fermé l'œil de la nuit (co-authored with Titus)
- La Légende de Pougne-Hérisson, le Nombril du Monde (co-authored with Titus)
- Jaulin raconte Pougne-Hérisson (including an interview with Nathael Moreau)
- Terrien (play text, including interviews with Wajdi Mouawad)
- Le Dodo (Éditions Paradox)
- Le Voyage à pas d’âne (Éditions Geste Paysanne; photographs by Eddy Rivière)
- Causer d’Amour
- Ma langue maternelle va mourir et j’ai du mal à vous parler d'Amour
- Manuel de résistance en Langue rare (Saint Rock project)

== Honours and awards ==
- Nominated for the 2020 Molière Award for Solo Performer (Ma langue maternelle va mourir et j’ai du mal à vous parler d’amour)
- Chevalier des Arts et des Lettres (2005)
- Chevalier of the Legion of Honour (14 July 2013): awarded by the Ministry of Culture
- Grand National Prize for Cultural Innovation (1999), awarded by Culture Minister Catherine Trautmann, for his work in rural cultural development
- Tasse d'or and Best Performance Awards at the Cannes Performance Festival (1990 and 2001)
- Unanimously elected "Deux‑Sévrien of the Year" (1995)
