= Laurent Mauvignier =

French writer (born 1967)

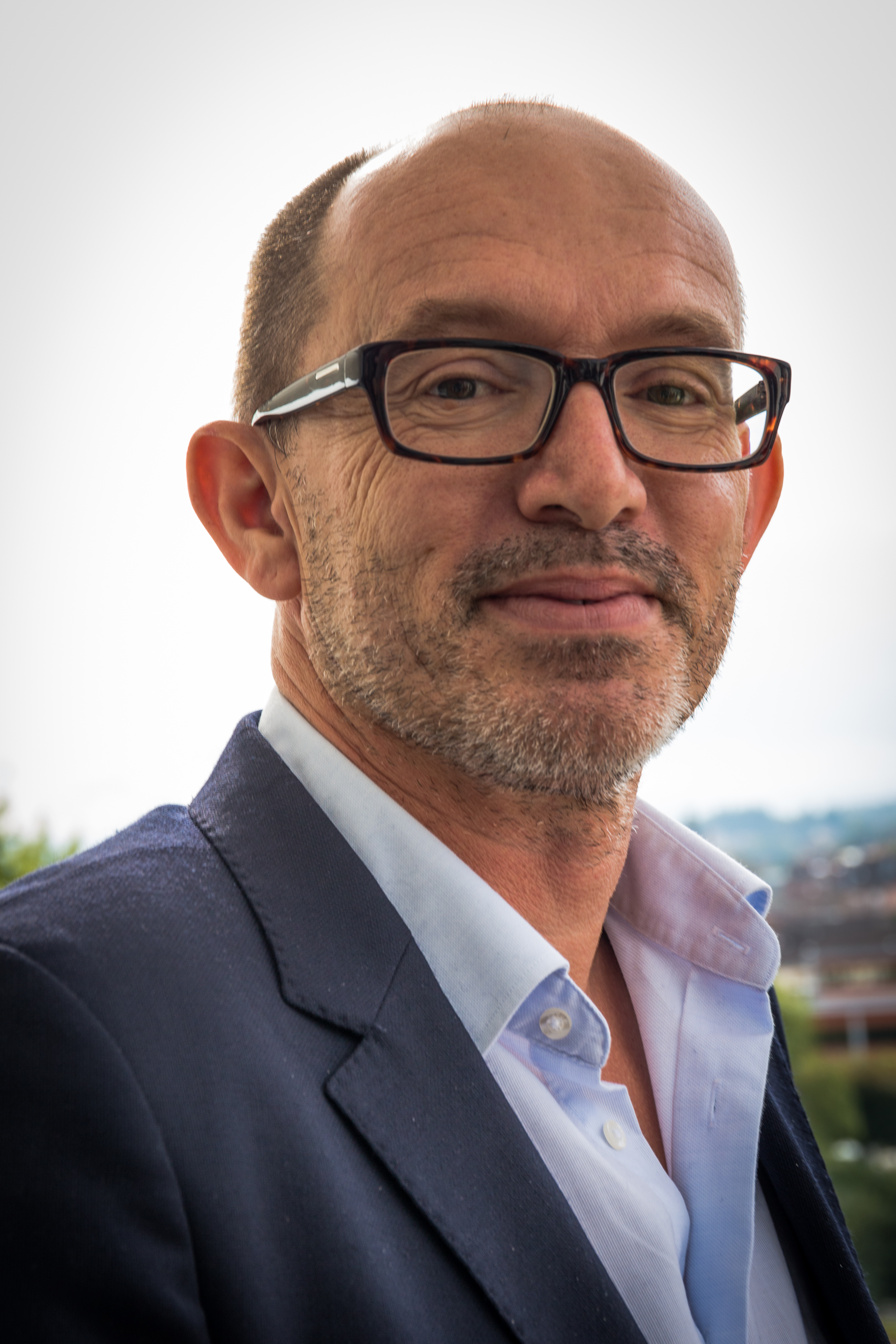
- Mauvignier in 2014
- Born: 6 July 1967 (age 59); Tours, France
- Occupations: Writer (prose and theatre)
- Family: Thierry Mauvignier (brother)
- Awards: Prix Goncourt (2025)

Laurent Mauvignier (French pronunciation: [lɔʁɑ̃ moviɲje]; born 6 July 1967) is a French writer. He won the 2025 Prix Goncourt for La Maison vide (The Empty House). He is the brother of director Thierry Mauvignier.

== Biography ==
After studying visual arts at the École supérieure des beaux-arts de Tours, Laurent Mauvignier decided to become a writer in the 1990s following the advice of Tanguy Viel, a friend and novelist. To date, all of his works have been published by Les Éditions de Minuit, where, along with Jean Echenoz, Jean-Philippe Toussaint, Marie NDiaye and Éric Chevillard, Laurent Mauvignier is associated with the so-called « Style [des éditions de] Minuit ».

The English translation of Histoires de la nuit by Daniel Levin Becker, published as The Birthday Party, was longlisted for the 2023 International Booker Prize.

In November 2025 Mauvignier won the Prix Goncourt for La Maison vide (The Empty House), a 750-page family saga spanning more than a century, inspired by stories of his father's family that he heard in childhood.

== Works ==
=== Novels ===
- Loin d'eux, éditions de Minuit, 1999, ISBN 978-2-7073-1671-4 – Prix Fénéon 2000
- Apprendre à finir, éditions de Minuit, 2000, ISBN 978-2-7073-1857-2 – Prix Wepler 2001; Inter Book Prize 2001
- Ceux d'à côté, éditions de Minuit, 2002, ISBN 978-2-7073-1766-7
- Plus sale, Inventaire-invention, 2002, ISBN 978-2-914412-18-6
- Seuls, éditions de Minuit, 2004, ISBN 978-2-7073-1846-6
- Le Lien, éditions de Minuit, 2005, ISBN 978-2-7073-1921-0
- Dans la foule, éditions de Minuit, 2006, ISBN 978-2-7073-1964-7 – Prix du roman Fnac 2006
- Des hommes, éditions de Minuit, 2009, ISBN 978-2-7073-2075-9 – Prix Virilo 2009; Prix des libraires 2010
- Un jour dans la vie, édité par la librairie Passages, 2010, ISBN 978-2-7073-2153-4
- Ce que j'appelle oubli, éditions de Minuit, 2011, ISBN 978-2-7073-2245-6
- Autour du monde, éditions de Minuit, 2014, ISBN 978-2-7073-2385-9 – Prix Amerigo-Vespucci 2014
- Retour à Berratham, éditions de Minuit, 2015, ISBN 978-2-7073-2883-0
- Histoires de la nuit, éditions de Minuit, 2020 ISBN 978-2-7073-4632-2 (The Birthday Party)
- La Maison vide (The Empty House), éditions de Minuit, 2025 ISBN 978-2-7073-5674-1 – Prix Goncourt 2025

Translated works:

- The Birthday Party [Histoires de la nuit], Transit Books, 2023, ISBN 978-1-945492-65-5.
- In the Crowd [Dans la foule], Faber and Faber, 2008, ISBN 978-0-571-23636-7.
- The Wound [Des hommes], University of Nebraska Press, 2015, ISBN 978-0-8032-3987-6.
- Ελληνική μετάφραση:(Greek Translation) Αυτό που εγώ ονομάζω λήθη, μετάφρ. Σπύρος Γιανναράς, εκδ. «`Αγρα», Αθήνα 2014, 75 σελ., ISBN 978-960-505-141-9

=== Play ===
- Tout mon amour, éditions de Minuit, 2012, ISBN 978-2-7073-2245-6.

== Literary prizes ==
- 2000: Prix Fénéon
- 2001: Prix Wepler
- 2001: Prix du Livre Inter
- 2006: Prix du roman Fnac
- 2010: Prix des libraires
- 2014: Prix Amerigo Vespucci
- 2025: Prix Goncourt
