= Makiko =

- Gender: Female

Origin
- Origin: Japanese
- Meaning: Different meanings depending on the kanji used

Makiko is a feminine Japanese given name. Notable people with the name include:

- Makiko Esumi (江角 マキコ; born 1966), Japanese model, actress, writer, essayist, and lyricist
- Makiko Fujino (藤野 真紀子; born 1949), Japanese politician of the Liberal Democratic Party
- Makiko Furuichi (born 1987), Japanese-born French painter
- Makiko Furukawa (古川 牧子; born 1947), Japanese former volleyball player
- Makiko Futaki (二木 真希子; 1958–2016), Japanese animator
- Makiko Hara (born 1967), Japanese independent curator
- Makiko Hirabayashi (平林 牧子; born 1966), Japanese jazz pianist
- Makiko Horai (宝来 眞紀子; born 1979), Japanese former volleyball player
- Makiko Ito (伊藤 真貴子; born 1973), Japanese long-distance runner
- Makiko Izawa (伊沢 まき子; born 1946), Japanese sprinter
- Makiko Kikuta (菊田 真紀子; born 1969), Japanese politician of the Democratic Party of Japan
- Makiko Kinoshita (木下 牧子; born 1956), Japanese composer
- Makiko Kishi (岸 真紀子; born 1976), Japanese politician
- Makiko Kuno (クノ真季子; born 1967), Japanese actress
- Makiko Mori (森 万紀子; 1934–1992), Japanese novelist
- Makiko Nagaya (長屋 真紀子; born 1955), Japanese speed skater
- Makiko Ōmoto (大本 眞基子; born 1973), Japanese voice actress
- Makiko Ono (小野 真紀子; born 1960), Japanese business woman and the CEO of Suntory Beverages and Food
- Makiko Saitō (born 1994), Japanese idol of idol group SKE48
- Makiko Sanada (真田 マキ子; born 1972), Japanese gymnast
- Makiko Sasada (佐々田 槙子; born 1985), Japanese mathematician and mathematical physicist
- Makiko Tanaka (田中 眞紀子; born 1944), Japanese politician, the daughter of former Prime Minister Kakuei Tanaka
- Makiko Tomita (冨田 真紀子; born 1991), Japanese rugby union and sevens player
- Makiko Watanabe (渡辺 真起子; born 1968), Japanese actress
- Makiko Yoshida (吉田 真希子; born 1976), Japanese hurdler

== Fictional characters ==
- Makiko Date, a character in the game series Digimon Story: Cyber Sleuth
- Makiko Onimaru, a character in the manga series Muteki Kanban Musume
- Makiko Nagi, a character in the manga series Tenjho Tenge
