= Hôtel du Grand Orient de France =

Hôtel particulier in Paris

Coordinates: 48.8749°N 2.3432°E

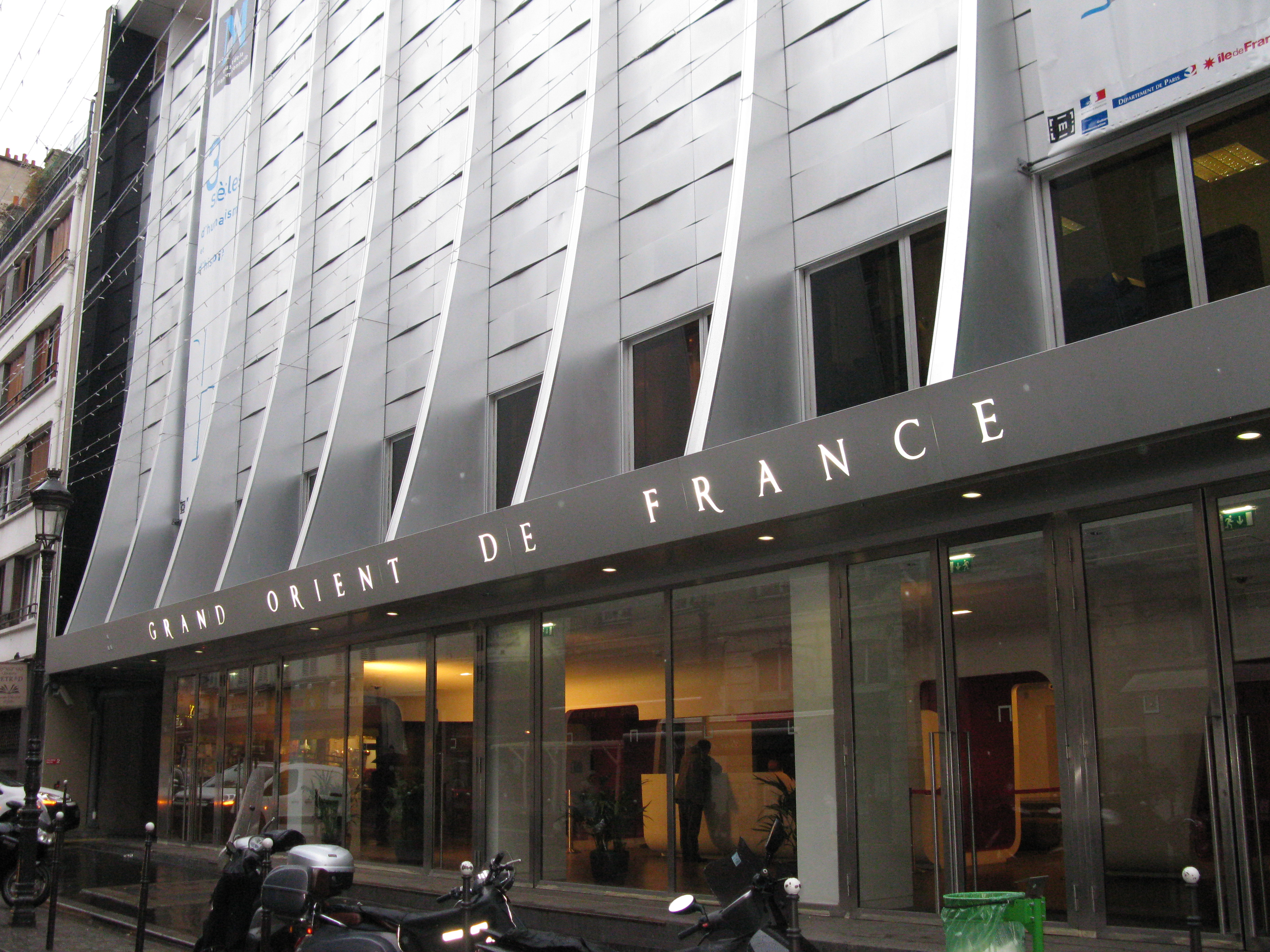
- Hôtel du Grand Orient de France
- Interactive map of the Hôtel du Grand Orient de France area

General information
- Location: Paris, France, 16, rue Cadet; 75009 Paris, France
- Management: Grand Orient de France

The Hôtel du Grand Orient de France (French pronunciation: [otɛl dy ɡʁɑ̃t‿ɔʁjɑ̃ də fʁɑ̃s]) is a hôtel particulier located at 16 rue Cadet, in the 9th arrondissement of Paris. It has been the headquarters of the Grand Orient de France since 1853 and also houses the Musée de la Franc-Maçonnerie.

== History ==
=== 18th – 19th century ===
Originally belonging to the Grimaldi family, the Hôtel du Grand Orient de France was notably occupied by the Prince of Monaco in 1700, the Duke of Richelieu in 1725, and Marshal Clauzel in 1830.

Under the leadership of its grand master, Prince Murat, the Grand Orient of France acquired the hotel as its headquarters. The Masonic temple was solemnly inaugurated on June 30, 1853, coinciding with the summer solstice.

In 1889, the Musée de la Franc-Maçonnerie was established within the building. Since 2003, it has held the designation of “museum of France” issued by the Ministry of Culture.

=== World War II ===
Freemasons, like the Jews, were accused of starting the Second World War and were hunted down by Nazi Germany. Consequently, on June 18, 1940, during the early days of the occupation of Paris, the Hôtel du Grand Orient de France was looted by the Einsatzstab Reichsleiter Rosenberg.

Following the promulgation of the law by the Vichy regime on August 13, 1940, which prohibited secret societies, all civil servants of the French state were required to take an oath of non-membership in these societies. The building subsequently became the headquarters of the Secret Societies Service on November 22, 1940. Under the direction of Bernard Faÿ and with the assistance of approximately one hundred agents under the supervision of the SD, the SPSS was responsible for creating a file of Freemasons and lodges for the German and French police services.

=== After the World War II ===
Between 1969 and 1972, a curtain wall facade was installed over the original facade.

On February 27, 2017, the hotel hosted a visit from a President of the French Republic, François Hollande, for the first time.

== Architecture ==
The building features 17 temples, including:

- Temple No. 1, designed in the Second Empire style;
- Temple No. 4, designed in the Art Deco style.
Temples in the hôtel du GODF

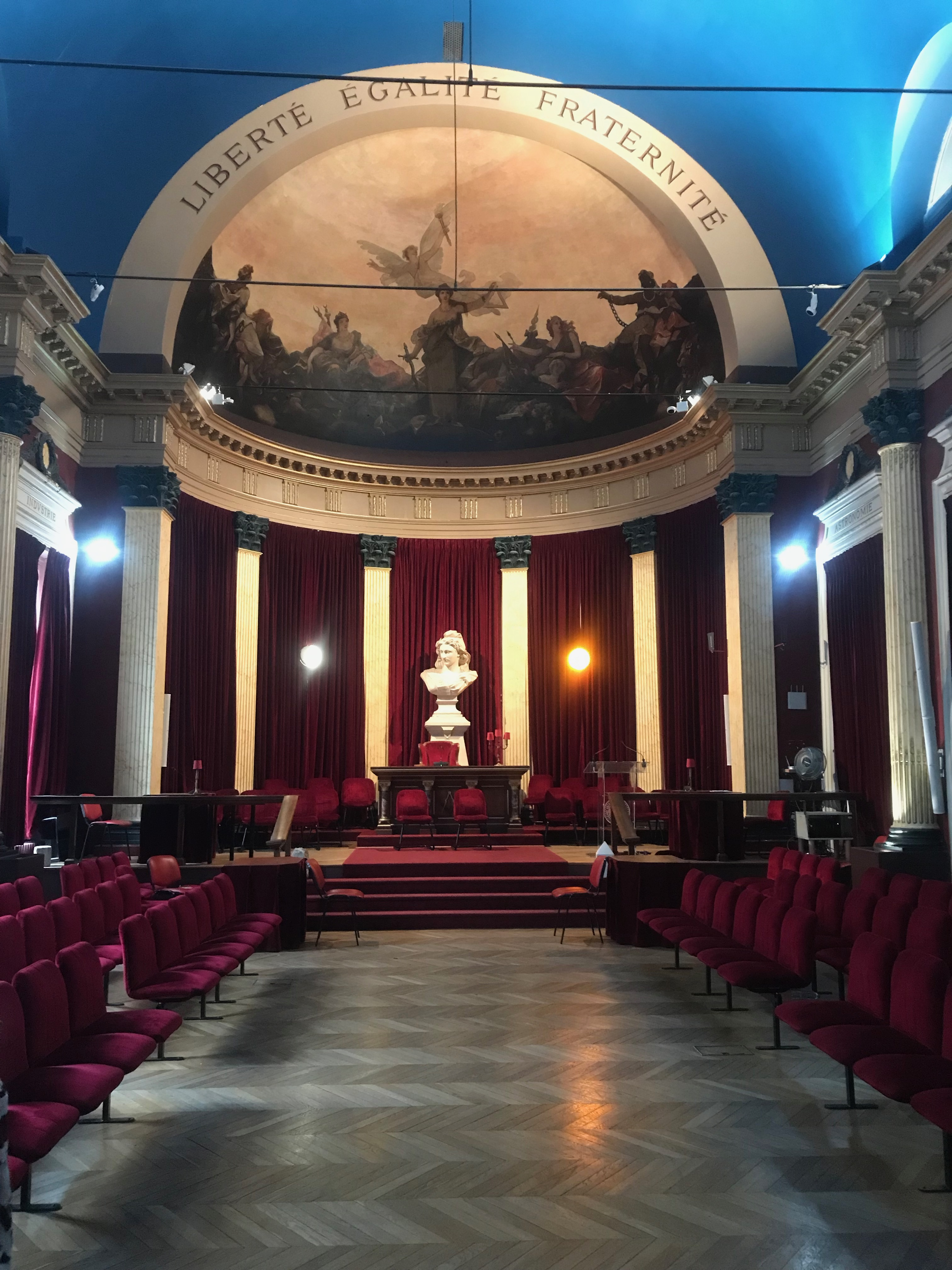

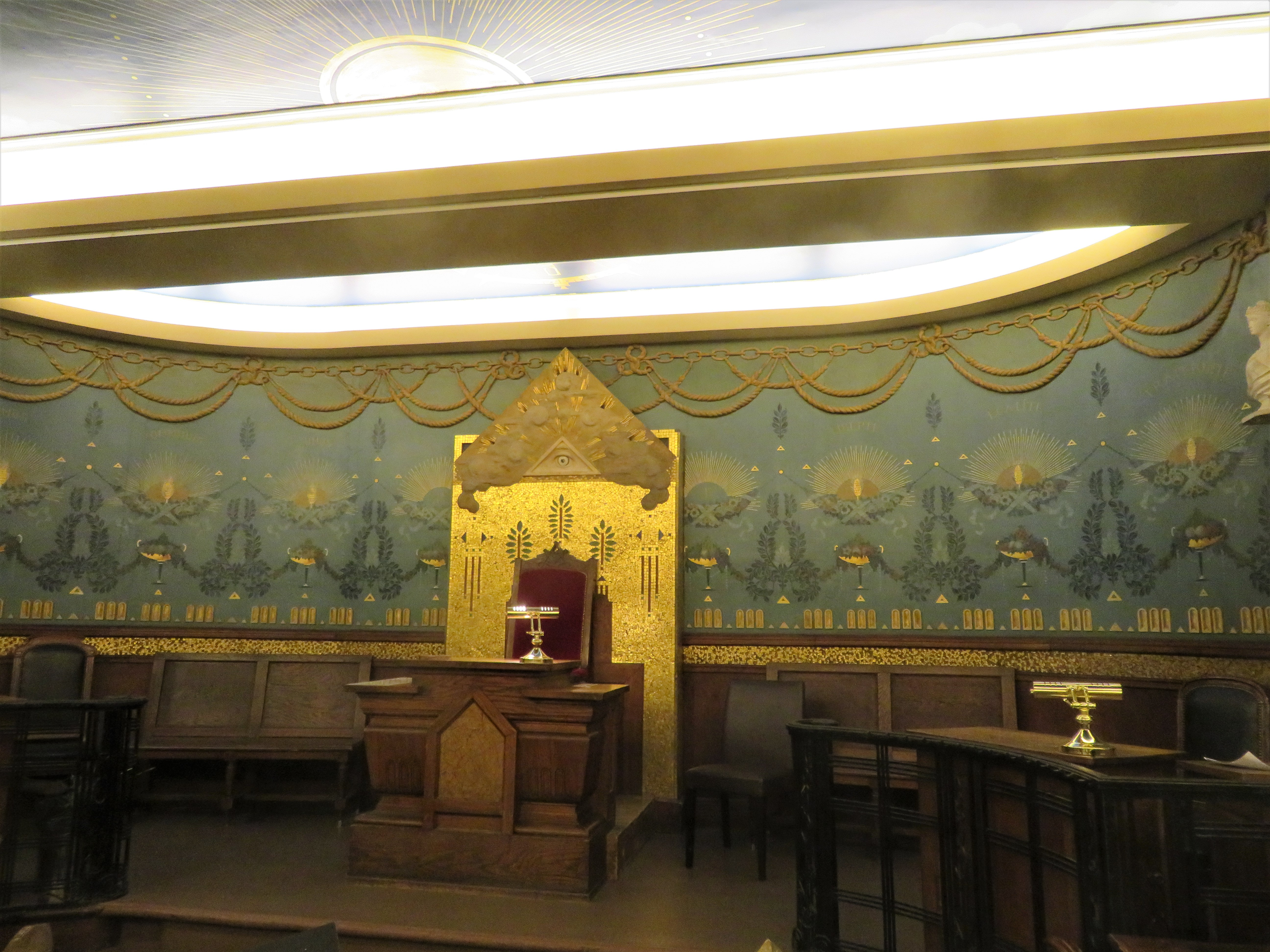
