= Matthew Cooperman =

American poet, critic and editor

Matthew Cooperman is an American poet, educator, editor, and ecocritic. He is the author of eight poetry collections, most recently the atmosphere is not a perfume it is odorless (Free Verse Editions/Parlor Press, 2024); Wonder About The (Middle Creek Publishing, 2023), winner of the Halcyon Prize; and NOS (disorder, not otherwise specified) (Futurepoem, 2018) which he wrote with fellow poet and life partner Aby Kaupang. Cooperman's first book, A Sacrificial Zinc, won the Lena Miles Wever-Todd Prize from Pleiades in 2001.

== Biography ==
Cooperman was born in 1964 in New Haven, Connecticut, and grew up in the Bay Area of California. He holds a BA in English from Colgate University, an MA in Creative Writing from the University of Colorado Boulder, and a PhD in English from Ohio University. Cooperman has taught at Cornell College in Iowa, University of Colorado Boulder, University of Denver, Ohio University, and Harvard University. He is currently Professor of English at Colorado State University. He lives in Fort Collins, Colorado, with poet Aby Kaupang and their two children.

== Publications ==
=== Poetry ===
His poems have appeared widely in literary journals, including 1913, American Letters & Commentary, Boston Review, CHAIN, Chicago Review, Denver Quarterly, ecopoetics, Hotel Amerika, Interim, International Quarterly, New American Writing, Parthenon West, Pleiades, Quarterly West, Sentence, Verse and VOLT, among others, and in anthologies including Ecopoetry, The Sentence Book of Prose Poetry, and The Next of Us is Yet to Be Born (Kent State).

=== Journals ===
Cooperman's criticism and interviews have also appeared in such journals as Angelaki: A Journal of Theoretical Humanities, Salt, ecopoetics, Chicago Review, jubilat, The Writers' Chronicle, The Iowa Review, Interdisciplinary Studies in Literature and the Humanities, American Studies International and the American Book Review.

=== Editing ===
Cooperman has been involved in editing for the publications Rolling Stock, Tattered Fetlock, Sphere, Shankpainter, and Colorado Review, and was a founding editor of the exploratory prose journal Quarter After Eight. He is currently co-poetry editor for Colorado Review.

== Other projects ==
Cooperman has worked with such groups and persons as Sharon Butcher Dance, Marisol Eckert Collective, artist Lisa Cooperman, Italian artist Simonetta Moro, Canadian composer Libby Larsen, and British poet Lawrence Upton. In 2004 he co-founded the collective Accidental Vestments with the Romanian artist Marius Lehene. Since that time he and Lehene have been active on a number of projects, including the image and textbook Imago for the Fallen World. With the poet Aby Kaupang, Cooperman has authored a number of works, most notably the ongoing projects NOS (disorder, not otherwise specified) and Jungle Book: A Memoir of Abilities. The two often perform together.

== Awards ==
Cooperman has been nominated five times for the Pushcart Prize and was a 2025 Guggenheim fellow. Cooperman has also been awarded a residency fellowship at the Fine Arts Work Center in Provincetown, the New Measure Prize from Parlor Press in 2014 for his collection Spool, the E. Marvin Lewis Award from WeberStudies, the Pavement Saw Chapbook Prize, the Wick Chapbook Prize from Kent State, the Billie Murray Denny Poetry Prize, and the Jovanovich Prize from the University of Colorado Boulder. He currently teaches at Colorado State University, and is a poetry editor for Colorado Review.

== Works ==
- Surge, Kent State University Press, 1999 ISBN 9780873386425
- A Sacrificial Zinc, Pleiades Press, 2001 ISBN 9780807127339
- Words About James, Phylum Press, 2005
- DaZE, Salt, 2006 ISBN 9781844712571
- Still: (to be) Perpetual, Dove Tail, 2007
- Still: of the Earth as the Ark which Does Not Move, Counterpath Press, 2011 ISBN 9781933996240
- Imago for the Fallen World, Jaded Ibis, 2013 ISBN 9781937543464
- Spool, Parlor Press, 2015 ISBN 9781602357440
- Disorder 299.00 with Aby Kaupang, Essay Press, 2016
- NOS (disorder, not otherwise specified) with Aby Kaupang, Futurepoem Books, 2018 ISBN 9780996002578
- A Little History of the Panorama, Ursus Americanus Press, 2020
- Wonder about the, Middle Creek, 2023 ISBN 9781957483085
- The atmosphere is not a perfume it is odorless, Parlor Press, 2024 ISBN 9781643174600
- Time and Its Monuments, Barrytown/Station Hill, 2025 ISBN 9781581772333
