= Laurent Kupferman =

French essayist and author (1966–2025)

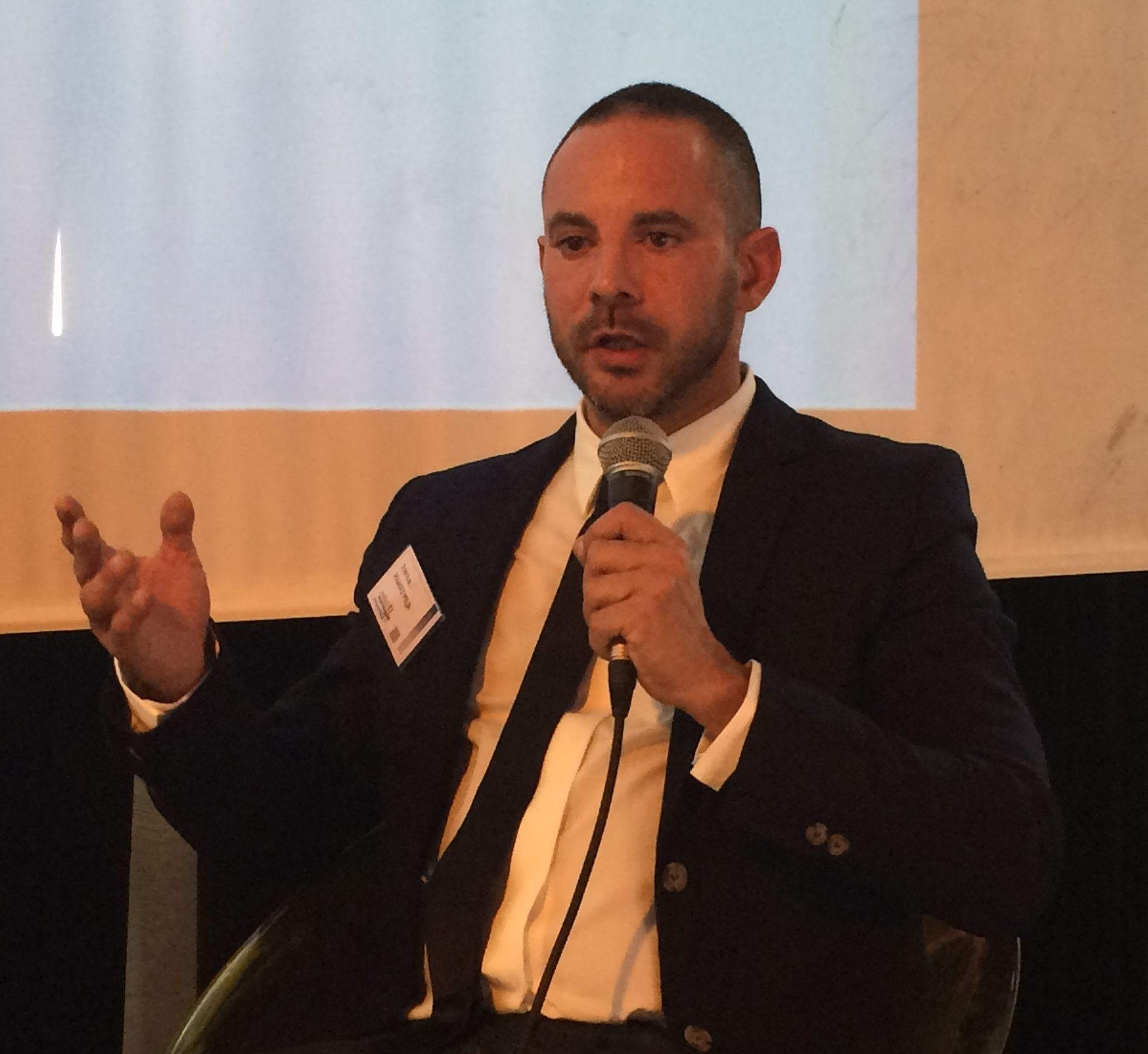
- Kupferman in 2015
- Born: Laurent Kupferman; 19 January 1966; Paris, France
- Died: 2 July 2025 (aged 59); Fontainebleau, France
- Education: Paris-Panthéon-Assas University
- Occupation(s): Essayist; Author
- Organizations: Grand Orient de France
- Parent: Fred Kupferman

Laurent Kupferman (19 January 1966 – 2 July 2025) was a French essayist and author. He was a member of the Grand Orient de France and wrote numerous books on Freemasonry.

== Early life and career ==
Born in Paris on 19 January 1966, Kupferman was the son of historian Fred Kupferman and author Sigrid Kupferman. He graduated from Paris-Panthéon-Assas University with a law degree and founded the Orchestre symphonique d’Europe alongside Éric Walter, Alain Seban, Olivier Benezech, and Olivier Holt. He then served as an advisor to Minister of Culture Philippe Douste-Blazy for several years. From 2016 to 2025, he was director of communications for Sésame Autisme Fédération Française..In 2017, Laurent Kupferman co-authored the book 3 Minutes to Understand the History, Foundations and Principles of the French Republic with Jean-Louis Debré.

In 2021, he launched a petition titled “Osez Joséphine” (“Dare to Joséphine”), calling for Joséphine Baker to be inducted into the Panthéon. The petition gathered nearly 38 000 signatures. He was received at the Élysée Palace as part of a delegation advocating for this cause. President Emmanuel Macron accepted the request, and the artist was inducted into the Panthéon on November 30, 2021, the anniversary of her marriage to Jean Lion, which had allowed her to obtain French nationality in 1937.

== Death ==
Kupferman was found dead from a drug overdose in a Fontainebleau apartment on 2 July 2025, at the age of 59. Two men were taken into custody for involuntary homicide.

== Distinctions ==
- Knight of the Ordre des Arts et des Lettres (2021)

== Works ==
- Les grands textes de la franc-maçonnerie décryptés (2011)
- 3 minutes pour comprendre les 50 principes fondamentaux de la franc-maçonnerie (2016)
- 3 minutes pour comprendre : l'histoire, les fondements et les principes de la République française: Les dates clés, les valeurs, les lois et réformes, les grandes figures... (2017)
- La Franc-Maçonnerie : une voie vers soi et vers les autres (2021)

== Participations ==
- Anne Bouillon : Justice pour toutes ! by Dylan Besseau.
- Joséphine Baker, un destin français by Dominique Eloudy.
