= John Finnie (painter) =

Scottish painter and engraver

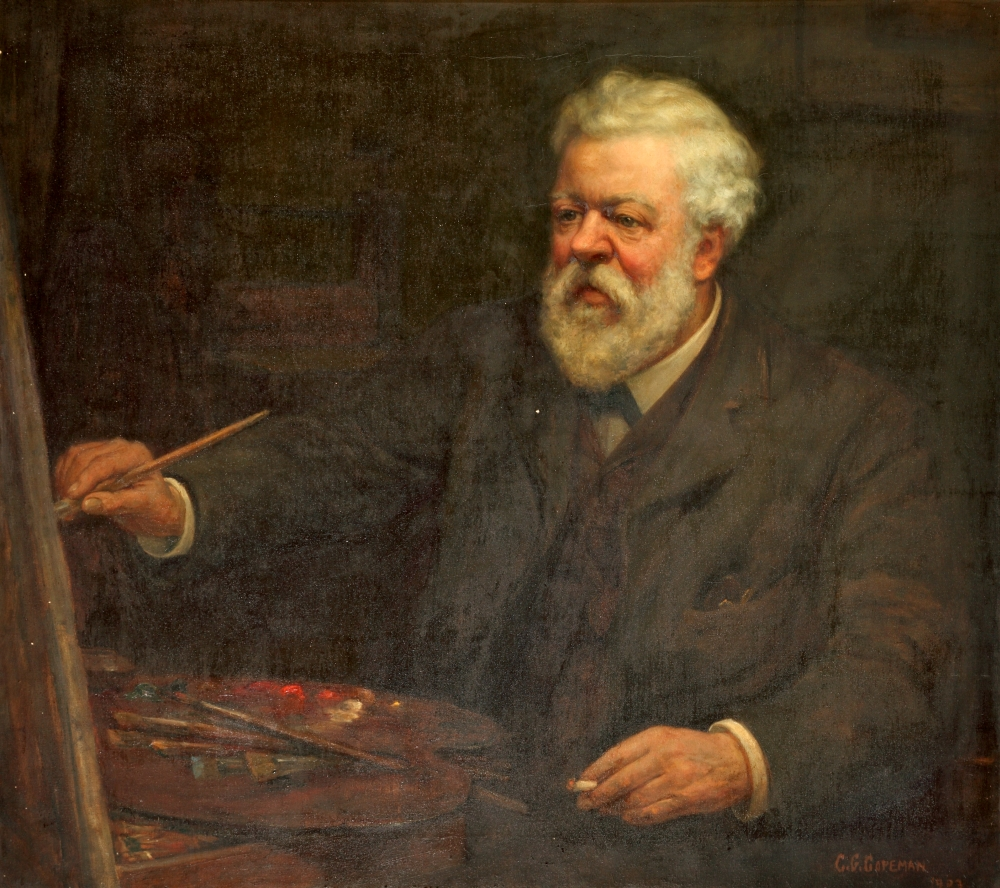
1903 portrait of John Finnie by Constance Copeman

John Finnie (1829–22 February 1907) was a Scottish landscape painter and engraver. He was best known in London for his original mezzotint engravings of landscape, and exhibited at the Royal Academy and the Royal Society of Painters, Etchers, and Engravers. When he moved to Towyn in northern Wales he painted numerous landscape paintings of places in the Capel Curig area, such as Snowdon. He was headmaster of the Liverpool Mechanics Institute and School of Art from 1855 until 1896. Several paintings related to him are on display in the Walker Art Gallery in Liverpool and the Portsmouth Museum.

== Biography ==
He was the son of John Finnie, brassfounder, by his wife Christian Mclndoe. He was born at Aberdeen, where he was baptised in the parish church on 4 May 1829. After serving apprenticeships to a house-painter at Edinburgh and a japanner at Wolverhampton he obtained employment with William Wailes, a glass-painter at Newcastle, where he remained five years, attending the school of design under William Bell Scott.

In 1853 he went to London, where he studied and taught in the Central School of Design at Marlborough House till, in 1855, he became master of the School of Art, then called the Mechanics' Institution, at Liverpool. In this position he continued forty-one years and six months, retiring at Christmas 1896. He is described as the dominating personality in the art life of Liverpool during that period. He began to send to the Liverpool Academy-exhibitions in 1856, became an associate in 1861, a full member and trustee in 1865, and was president of the academy in 1887–8. He was also president of the Artists' Club and of the Liver Sketching Club.

His earliest etching, the 'Head of Windermere,' dates from 1864. After some early experiments in etching and engraving Finnie adopted mezzotint as his favourite process in 1886. Though he exhibited pictures at the Royal Academy from 1861 onwards, and also at the British Institution and in Suffolk Street, he was best known in London by his original mezzotint engravings of landscape, exhibited at the Royal Academy and the Royal Society of Painters, Etchers, and Engravers, of which he became an associate on 24 October 1887, and a fellow on 6 April 1895. He sent forty-seven contributions in all to the society's gallery. His etchings and mezzotints, which are represented by specimens in the print-room of the British Museum, aim too much at a full pictorial effect, instead of observing the restrictions of graphic art. As a painter he is represented in the Walker Art Gallery at Liverpool. He also exhibited at the Society of British Artists which he was elected to in 1884, the Dudley Gallery, the New Gallery, the Royal Institute of Oil Painters and Royal Institute of Painters in Water Colours, the Royal Society of Artists in Birmingham, Glasgow Institute of the Fine Arts, the Royal Scottish Academy, and Manchester City Art Gallery. Finnie also exhibited at the Salon Artistes Français and received a commendation in 1896. He joined the Royal Cambrian Academy in 1894 and became its treasurer in 1897.

On retiring from the School of Art, in 1896, Finnic broke up his home in Huskisson Street and settled at Towyn, near Llandudno, where he spent his life in painting, engraving, and music. He retained full vigour until an attack of influenza injured his heart in 1905. He returned to Liverpool, where he died on 27 February 1907. He was buried at Smithdown Road cemetery beside his wife, Agnes James Ellison, who died on 8 July 1889. One son. Dr. Ellison Finnie, survived him. A memorial exhibition of his art, comprising 438 numbers, was held at the Walker Art Gallery, Liverpool, in 1907. The gallery contains many of his works today as does the Portsmouth Museum. Other works are in the Norwich Castle museum and Wolverhampton Art Gallery. Among his protégés were Constance Copeman, who painted a portrait of him in 1903, now on display in the Walker Art Gallery, Elizabeth Dean, and William Henry Crome.

== Selected works ==
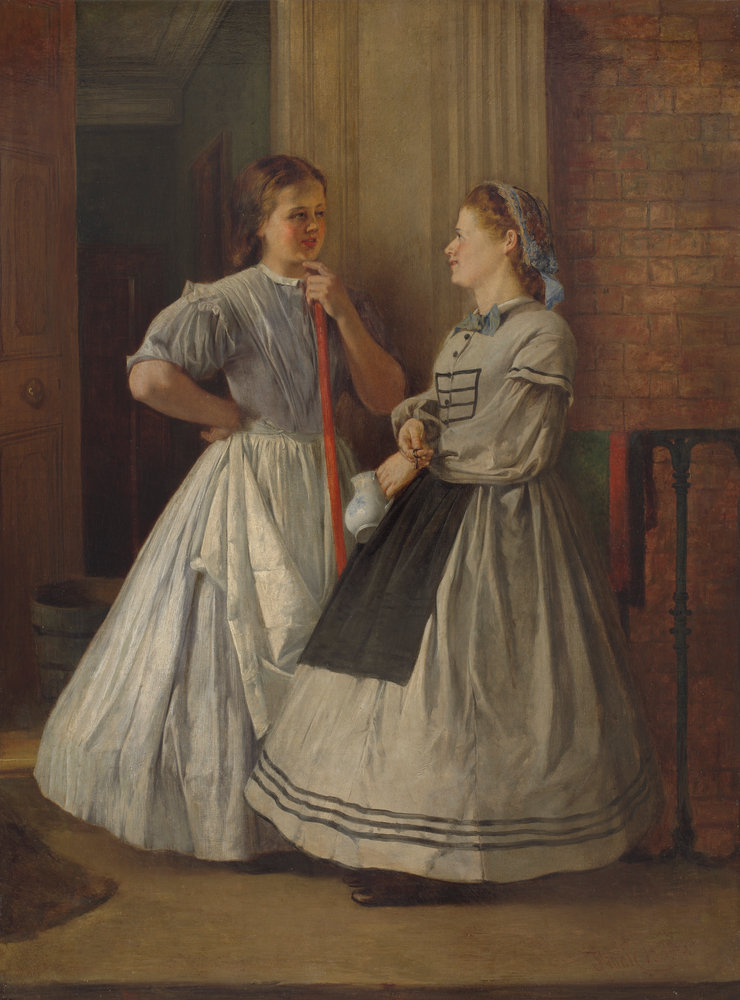
Maids of All Work

- Moel Siabod, from Capel Curig (c.1860)
- A Member of the Naval Reserve (1862)
- Maids of All Work (1864–5)
- Gathering Wild Flowers (1865)
- Snowdon from Capel Curig (1870)
- The Meeting of the Mersey and the Weaver (c.1874)
- Sunshine and Cloud, View near Capel Curig (1875–6)
- Sunset at Pangbourne (1878)
- Chester with St John's Church (1879)
- The Close of a Stormy Day, Vale of Clwyd (1893)
- The Little Orme (c.1897)
- The Heart of Nature (1898)
- A Tragic Sunset
- The River

== Notes ==
Attribution

This article incorporates text from a publication now in the public domain: Lee, Sidney, ed. (1912). "Finnie, John". Dictionary of National Biography (2nd supplement). Vol. 2. London: Smith, Elder & Co.
