= Institute for Doctoral Studies in the Visual Arts =

Private graduate school in Maine, U.S.

- Type: Private graduate school
- Established: 2006; 20 years ago
- Founder: George Smith
- Accreditation: NECHE
- President: Simonetta Moro
- Location: Portland, Maine, United States; 43.654001°N 70.272174°W
- Campus: 1 acre (0.40 ha)
- Website: www.idsva.edu

The Institute for Doctoral Studies in the Visual Arts (IDSVA) is a private, non-profit, low-residency graduate school headquartered in Portland, Maine. Founded in 2006–2007 by George Smith, IDSVA offers the Doctor of Philosophy (Ph.D.) in Visual Arts: Philosophy, Aesthetics, and Art Theory.

IDSVA is distinguished as the first and only school in the world to offer a Ph.D. in philosophy designed specifically for visual artists, curators, and creative scholars, operating without a traditional campus. The program has been cited by African-American art historian David Driskell called the institution "one of the single most important developments in the recent history of art education."

== History ==
=== Founding and Rationale ===
IDSVA was founded in 2006 by George Smith, a former vice president for academic affairs and dean at the Maine College of Art (MECA). Smith created the program to offer the Doctor of Philosophy to visual artists who wanted an academic credential beyond the Master of Fine Arts, a group he termed "artist-philosophers". Smith was motivated by a conviction that the American Master of Fine Arts (MFA) programs were "out of step with contemporary art practice," which increasingly demanded research, writing, and critical skills. He initially reformed the MFA program at MECA to be half-studio and half-theory.

Smith founded IDSVA to fully realize the concept of training "artist-philosophers," believing that the artist is inherently a philosopher. The institution's core premise, distinguishing it from other doctoral programs for artists, is the direct recognition of the MFA as a scholarly credential, eliminating the need for artists to pursue an additional master's degree in philosophy:

"We recognize your MFA as substantiation of intellectual/scholarly talent as it comes out of art as philosophy. You can study here; you can write your dissertation and take your doctorate in philosophy with us."

The first class began its studies in 2007 with a summer session residency at Spannocchia Castle in Tuscany, Italy. The school operates on an innovative model based on Smith's vision to operate "without a campus," focusing resources entirely on faculty, online learning and travel. Students complete much of their work remotely but participate in international residencies, which are held in North America, Europe, and North Africa.

=== Accreditation and Early Success ===
In December 2010, the IDSVA achieved a crucial benchmark by receiving candidacy status for accreditation from the New England Commission of Higher Education(NECHE) formerly known as the New England Association of Schools and Colleges (NEASC). This recognition was vital, as it made students eligible for federal student aid. At the time, Smith successfully defended the program’s unique independent structure against concerns from other institutional leaders, emphasizing the program’s speed and efficiency.

By 2012—only its sixth year—IDSVA demonstrated significant early academic success when five students were selected to present scholarly papers at the annual College Art Association (CAA) conference, a showing described as "unprecedented" for a new institution's students. In 2025 thirteen students and nine alumni were selected to present at the SECAC conference (formerly the Southeastern College Art Conference) in Cincinnati, Ohio.

=== Leadership ===
In 2024, Italian artist Simonetta Moro was named the second president of the Institute, succeeding founder and President Emeritus George Smith.

== Academics and Program Structure ==
=== Program Distinction ===
The Ph.D. is a non-studio, research-based degree that is aligned with the rigorous curriculum and requirements of traditional doctoral humanities programs, including general knowledge exams and the writing and defense of a dissertation on an original research topic.

The curriculum is centered on the relationship between the history of ideas, philosophy, and visual culture history. It uses an elliptical approach, rather than a sequential or hierarchical one, to explore texts ranging from the pre-Socratics to contemporary theory.

=== Student Profile and Goals ===
The program is designed primarily for mid-career working professionals who teach in college and university art departments. The average age of students is approximately 45. The degree aims to equip artists with the advanced critical skills necessary to:

1. Engage in the larger cultural dialogue and compete for critical publication opportunities.
2. Compete for tenure-track teaching posts, as institutional hiring data often favors Ph.D.-carrying colleagues over those with only an MFA.

=== Low-Residency and Topological Studies ===
The low-residency model allows students to pursue the degree without interrupting their careers, combining online instruction with intensive, mandatory global Topological Studies (residencies) that connect place, art, and philosophy.

Residency locations, which serve as the school's "classrooms," are strategically chosen historical and cultural sites, including:

- Europe: Rome, Spannocchia Castle (Tuscany), Siena, Florence, Berlin, Venice (Venice Biennale), Paris, and Istanbul.
- North America: New York City and Brown University.
- North Africa: Marrakech, Morocco.

=== Dissertation and Outcome ===
The degree culminates in a dissertation, which averages 80,000 words and is typically completed over two years. Students present their rhizomatic Independent Studies as formal papers at residencies, creating a "world-conference" setting. Graduates of the program are expected to be positioned to make advances in cultural criticism and production, leading to better-informed studio practice.
