= Pierre Mollier =

French historian and freemason (born 1961)

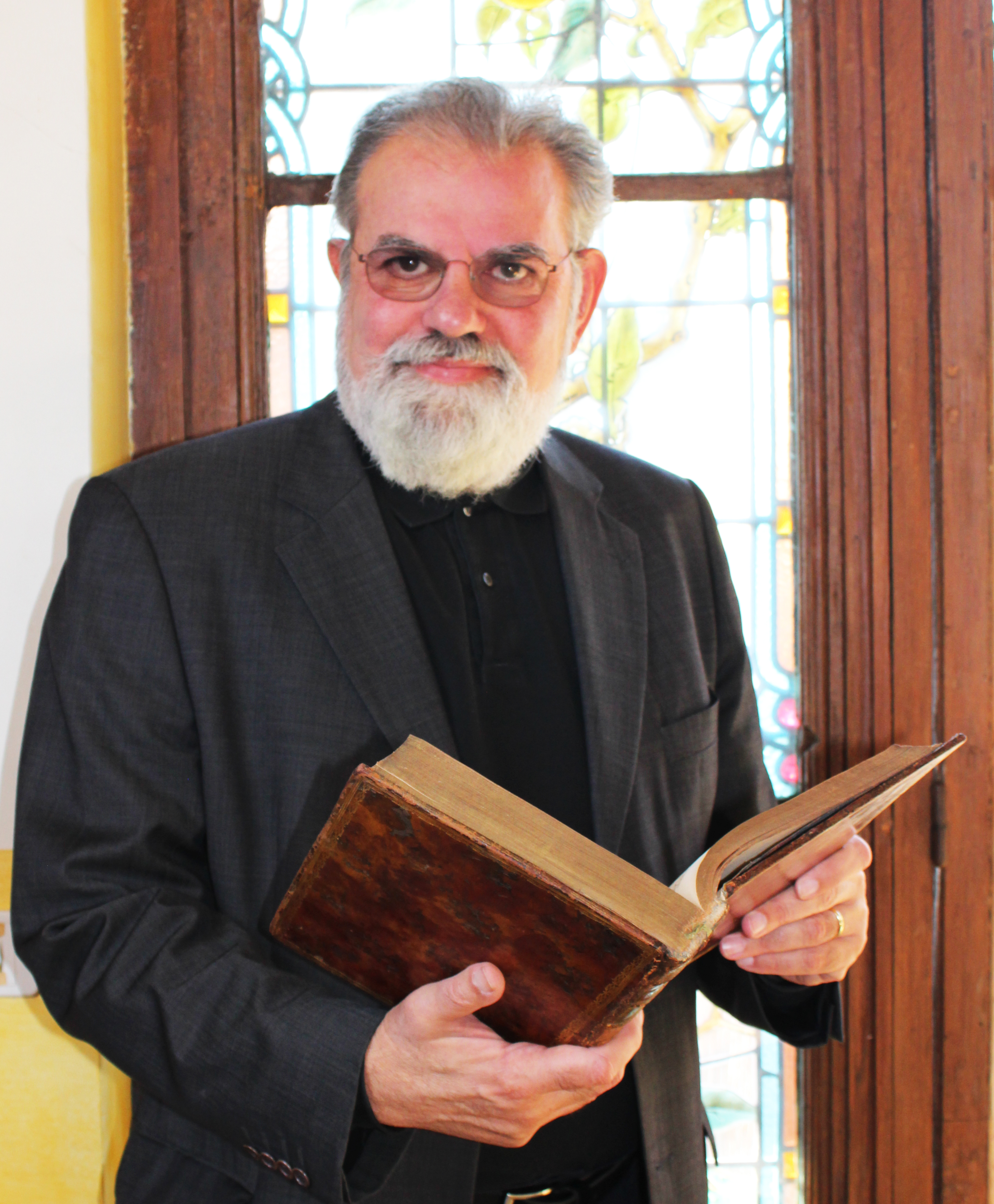
Pierre Mollier, 2019

Pierre Mollier is a French historian and freemason, born in Lyon in 1961. A graduate of Sciences Po (Institut d'Études Politiques de Paris), he holds a master's degree in Religious Studies (École pratique des hautes études, section V, La Sorbonne), and is the director of the library, archives, and museum for the Grand Orient de France (Musée de la Franc-Maçonnerie).

He is a specialist in the history of Freemasonry, covering both social and political fields, as well as philosophical and spiritual topics. He has researched the links between Freemasonry and the power in France under Napoleon (1800–1815) and during the Third Republic (1870–1940). As an expert in the history of Masonic rites, he has also researched the various aspects of the symbolic imagery (guild marks, heraldry, emblems). Editor-in-chief of the symbolic and Masonic review, Renaissance Traditionnelle and of the on-line journal Ritual, Secrecy, and Civil Society, he co-directs the Chroniques d’Histoire Maçonnique. He also contributes to several other reviews, including Politica Hermetica and La Phalère. Furthermore, he is an expert on and biographer of French painter François-Jean Garneray (1755–1837), one of Jacques-Louis David’s first students. He was named officer in the Ordre des Arts et des Lettres by the French Ministry of Culture.

== Books ==
- Le Régulateur du Maçon (1785-«1801»), la fixation des grades symboliques du Rite Français : histoire et documents, éditions « A l’Orient », Paris, 2004, 300 pp.
- La Chevalerie Maçonnique : Franc-maçonnerie, imaginaire chevaleresque et légende templière au siècle des Lumières, Dervy, Collection Renaissance Traditionnelle, Paris, 2005, 230. pp.
- L’Etat-major maçonnique de Napoléon, dictionnaire biographique des dirigeants du Grand Orient de France sous le Premier Empire, avec Pierre-François Pinaud, préface de Charles Napoléon, Éditions « A l’Orient », Orléans, 2009, 312 pp.

== Selection of articles in English ==
- The social impact of French Freemasonry through three centuries: a global approach, dans The Social Impact of Freemasonry on the Modern Western World, Canonbury Masonic Research Centre, Londres, 2002, pp. 135–143.
- An American – Freemason – in Paris, Benjamin Franklin, The Chain of Union, n°2, special issue, 2003, pp. 41–49.
- News from the "Russian Archives", about the early history of the high degrees: The Scottish Order in Berlin from 1742 to 1752, The Chain of Union, n°2, special issue, 2003, pp. 59–64.
- The Double-Headed Eagle: iconographic sources of the masonic symbol, The Chain of Union, n°3, special issue, 2004, pp. 5–15.
- Rebuilding the Sanctuaries of Memphis: Egypt in Masonic Iconography and Architecture, with John Hamill, in Imhotep Today: Egyptianizing Architecture, UCL Press, Londres, 2003, pp. 207–220.
- Neo-Templar Traditions, article in Dictionary of Gnosis and Western Esotericism, edited by Wouter J. Hanegraaf, Brill Academic Publishers, Leiden, Boston, 2005, T. II, pp. 849–853.
- Chrétien-Guillaume Riebesthal: From the Religions of the Revolution to Paramasonic Ceremonies,, in Ritual, Secrecy, and Civil Society, Volume 1, Issue, Spring 2013, Policy Studies Organization, p. 46-50.
- The Masonic Degree of Rose-Croix and Christianity: The Complex Links between Religion and Freemasonry during the Enlightenment, in Ritual, Secrecy, and Civil Society, Volume 1, Issue 2, Winter 2013, Policy Studies Organization, p. 14-24.
- Mollier, Pierre (2014). "Freemasonry and Templarism". In Bodgan, Henrik; Snoek, Jan A. M. (eds.). Handbook of Freemasonry. Brill Handbooks on Contemporary Religion. Vol. 8. Leiden: Brill Publishers. pp. 82–99. doi:10.1163/9789004273122_007. ISBN 978-90-04-21833-8. ISSN 1874-6691.
