= Bernard Dov Cooperman =

- Born: October 9, 1946 (age 79); Toronto, Ontario, Canada
- Education: Harvard University; Brandeis University; University of Toronto
- Scientific career
- Fields: Jewish history
- Workplaces: University of Maryland

Bernard Dov Cooperman (born October 9, 1946) is a Louis L. Kaplan Associate Professor of Jewish History at the University of Maryland in the Department of History. Cooperman was on the faculty of Harvard University until 1989, has been a Fellow of the Institute for Advanced Studies at Hebrew University of Jerusalem, and a Lilly Fellow (1994–95). He served as Director of the Meyerhoff Center for Jewish Studies from 1991 to 1997.

He received his B.A. from the University of Toronto in 1968, his M.A. from Brandeis University in 1969, his M.A. from Harvard University in 1972, and his Ph.D. from Harvard in 1976.

He is the author of In Iberia and Beyond: Hispanic Jews Between Cultures.

== Bibliography ==
- Cooperman, Bernard Dov (1983). Jewish thought in the sixteenth century. Harvard Judaica texts and studies, 2. Cambridge, Mass: Harvard University Press.
- Cooperman, Bernard Dov (1983). Realities and dreams: images of the world in Israeli children's literature. Cambridge: Harvard University Library.
- Curiel, Roberta; Cooperman, Bernard Dov (1990). The Venetian ghetto. New York: Rizzoli.
- Katz, Jacob (1993). Cooperman, Bernard Dov (ed.). Tradition and crisis: Jewish society at the end of the Middle Ages. New York: New York University Press.
- Cooperman, Bernard Dov (1998). In Iberia and beyond: Hispanic Jews between cultures. Newark: University of Delaware Press.
- Cooperman, Bernard Dov; Garvin, Barbara (2000). The Jews of Italy: memory and identity. Studies and texts in Jewish history and culture, 7. Bethesda, Md: University Press of Maryland.
- Cooperman, Bernard Dov; Zohar, Zvi (2013). Jews and Muslims in the Islamic world. Studies and texts in Jewish history and culture, 21. Bethesda, Md: University Press of Maryland.
