= Constance Copeman =

British painter, printmaker, and engraver (1864-1953)

Constance Gertrude Copeman
- Born: 1864; Liverpool
- Died: 1953 (aged 88–89); Liverpool
- Known for: Painting

Constance Gertrude Copeman (1864–1953) was a British painter, printmaker and engraver often of animal figures.

== Biography ==
Copeman was born in Liverpool where her father was a solicitor. She attended the Liverpool School of Art between 1891 and 1900, where she studied under John Finnie. Copeman then studied at St Ives in Cornwall with Julius Olsson for a time before returning to live in Liverpool. Copeman exhibited on a regular basis at the annual Liverpool Autumn exhibitions from 1885 to 1938 and, from 1894, at the Royal Academy on six occasions. Works by Copeman were also shown at the Royal Cambrian Academy, the Royal Glasgow Institute of the Fine Arts and the Royal Society of Painter-Etchers and Engravers. The latter society elected Copeman as an associate member in 1897. She was also a member of the Liverpool Academy of Arts. The Walker Art Gallery in Liverpool holds examples of her work while Liverpool City Libraries holds some of her sketching albums. Her work is exhibited at many auctions throughout the world and with realized prices ranging from $483 USD to $1,896 USD, depending on the size and medium of the artwork. The current record price for this artist at auction is $3,244 USD for "Children Playing in the Cobbles at Runswick Bay", sold in 2019.
