= Nathan Kuppermann =

American pediatrician

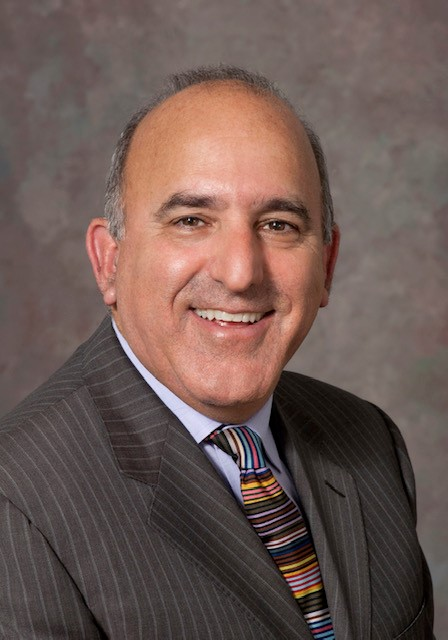
- Education: Stanford University(BSc Biology) 06/1981 University of California San Francisco(MD) 06/1985 Harvard University(MPH Public Health) 06/1993
- Occupations: Associate Dean for Global Health, UC Davis School of Medicine and UC Davis Health Distinguished Professor, UC Davis School of Medicine Professor and Endowed Chair, Emergency Medicine, UC Davis School of Medicine

Nathan Kuppermann is an American pediatrician and emergency physician who is a member of the National Academy of Medicine. He serves as a distinguished professor in the Departments of Emergency Medicine and Pediatrics at the UC Davis School of Medicine, educating future physicians about the fields he is adept in. Additionally, he holds the esteemed Bo Tomas Brofeldt Endowed Chair in emergency medicine. Dr. Kuppermann has made many notable contributions as the founding chair of the Pediatric Emergency Care Applied Research Network (PECARN), and subsequently as the chair of the global Pediatric Emergency Research Network (PERN). His contributions to pediatric emergency research and care highlights his dedication to improving the well-being of young patients across the world.

== Education ==
Kuppermann received his B.SC in Biology at Stanford University. He completed his Doctorate in Medicine at the University of California, San Francisco School of Medicine and continued on to Harvard University, School of Public Health for his Masters in Public Health.

== Academic work ==
He is both a pediatric emergency physician and clinical epidemiologist. Kuppermann has been a federally-funded investigator for many years and has particular interests in the clinical efficiency and utility of laboratory testing in the setting of the Pediatric Emergency Department. His research has specially emphasized the laboratory evaluation of young febrile children, evaluation of children at risk of diabetic ketoacidosis-related cerebral edema and laboratory and radiographic evaluation of the pediatric trauma patient.

== Early Research ==
Kuppermann’s early research addressed the identification of young children presenting to the emergency department (ED) with infectious emergencies. These studies focused on distinguishing young febrile children with serious bacterial infections (SBIs) from those with viral illnesses. His studies derived and validated prediction rules in order to aid ED clinicians in risk stratifying infants at low and high-risk of SBIs, and his studies centered on meningitis, bacteremia, and urinary tract infections.

== Notable Contributions to Research ==
Kuppermann has extensive experience performing large, multicenter randomized controlled trials and observational studies pertaining to pediatric trauma.

Kuppermann has been studying trauma in children for over 20 years and has been particularly active in research pertaining to traumatic brain injuries (TBI) in children. In an important study headed by Kuppermann, he enrolled ~45,000 children that experience head trauma to discover how to greatly reduce radiation exposure caused by unnecessary CT scans. This was done by determining the risk of pediatric TBIs from relevant predictive factors which gives providers more insight whether or not a CT scan is warranted. Similarly, Kuppermann has served as senior investigator/co-PI in research pertaining to pediatric abdominal trauma through which he derived a highly accurate prediction rule for CT use, the largest of which enrolled >12,000 children with abdominal trauma. The CT prediction rule is now widely practiced today.

His other notable research pertains to diabetic ketoacidosis (DKA) in children, and he has been involved in this research for over 20 years. He has served as a PI and Primary co-I on several extramural grants related to DKA and cerebral injury/edema in children, and one of his earliest research collaborations of the topic resulted in a highly-cited publication in the New England Journal of Medicine.

Kuppermann's >300 publications has been cited roughly 20 thousand times and has an h-index of 74.

== Professional Service ==
Kuppermann has been a leader in multicenter research in emergency services for children, and he has worked to increase the evidence base in pediatric emergency medicine. He served as the Chair of the Pediatric Emergency Medicine Collaborative Research Committee (PEMCRC) of the American Academy of Pediatrics from 1996-2000. Through this committee, he conducted various research studies in which thousands of children were enrolled.

Kuppermann was Chair of the Steering Committee of PECARN since its inception in 2001 until late in 2008. This network is funded by HRSA/MCHB and EMSC and consists of 22 geographically and demographically diverse hospital pediatric emergency departments which evaluate ~ 1,300,000 children annually. Since its creation, PECARN has published more than 200 peer-reviewed publications and secured more than $150 million in extramural funding, and from 2019-2023, Kuppermann was re-funded to participate in PECARN with a $2.8 million award. As a leader of PECARN, his work has helped shape the future concerning pediatric emergency care and advanced the ability to perform large-scale, multicenter research across the country.

Dr. Kuppermann has been working with and supporting a health clinic in Kathmandu, Nepal since 1987 and has returned many times. He has worked clinically there, has served as an educator and fund-raiser, and participated in acute earthquake medical relief in 2015. In 2021 he helped found a non-profit "Friends for Health Nepal”(FFHN), which he serves as president, to help support the clinic.

== Notable Ongoing Projects ==
Most currently, Kuppermann has investigated novel biomarkers and measured the host response to distinguish viral from bacterial infections in young febrile infants.

Ongoing Projects:

A randomized controlled trial of abdominal ultrasound (FAST) in children with blunt torso trauma

09/07/2022 – 08/31/2027

Headache Assessment of Children for Emergent Intracranial Abnormalities

07/01/2020 – 06/30/2025

PRagMatic Pediatric Trial of Balanced versus Normal Saline Fluid in Sepsis (PRoMPT BOLUS)

04/01/2020 – 03/31/2025

Emergency Medical Service for Children Network Development

9/01/2019 – 8/31/2023

RNA Biosignatures: A Paradigm Change for the Management of Febrile Infants

8/21/2015 – 4/30/2023

== Awards and honors ==
Maureen Andrew Mentor Award, Society for Pediatric Research(2022)

Hibbard Williams Extraordinary Achievement Award(2020)

Faculty Distinguished Research Award, UC Davis(2020)

Chancellor’s Departmental Achievement Award for Diversity and Community for Emergency Medicine(2020)

Dean’s Team Award for Excellence for the Pediatric Emergency Care Applied Research Network (PECARN), UC Davis School of Medicine(2018)

Distinguished Professor, UC Davis School of Medicine(2018)

Inaugural winner of SAEM Scientific Mentoring Award in Pediatric Emergency Medicine(2017)

Dean’s Team Award for Excellence in Mentoring, UC Davis School of Medicine(2017)

UC Davis School of Medicine Research Award(2016)

Best Scientific Abstract, American Academy of Pediatrics Section on Emergency Medicine(2015)

American College of Emergency Physicians (ACEP) EBSCO/PEMSoft Achievement Award(2015)

Ludwig-Seidel Award, American Academy of Pediatrics(2012)

Best Scientific Abstract, American Academy of Pediatrics Section on Emergency Medicine(2012)

Best Scientific Paper, American Academy of Pediatrics Section on Emergency Medicine(2011)

American College of Emergency Physicians Outstanding Research Award(2011)

Elected to the National Academy of Medicine(Institute of Medicine)(2010)

EMSC National Hero’s Award: Outstanding Research Project(2010)

Society for Academic Emergency Medicine (SAEM) Excellence in Research Award(2010)

Miller-Sarkin Mentoring award, Academic Pediatric Association(2009)

Dean’s Excellence in Research Award, UC Davis School of Medicine(2008)

Willis Wingert Award (mentor for Best Scientific Paper by a Trainee), EM, AAP(2008)

Pediatric Emergency Medicine and Critical Care Research Award, AAP(2008)

Emergency Medical Service for Children (EMSC) National Hero’s Award: Outstanding Research(2007)

Outstanding Contribution to Faculty Development and Diversity, UC Davis School of Med(2007)

Pediatric Emergency Medicine and Critical Care Research Award(2006)

Dean’s Team Award for Excellence in Mentoring, UC Davis School of Medicine(2003)

Fulbright Distinguished Scholar, U.K.(2003)

Pediatric Emergency Medicine and Critical Care Research Award(2002)

Outstanding Consultant, Annals of Emergency Medicine(2000)

Academic Teacher of the Year Award, Emergency Medicine, UC Davis School of Medicine(2000)

Outstanding Faculty Clinical Instructor, UC Davis School of Medicine(1998)

The Role Model Award, Department of Pediatrics, UC Davis School of Medicine(1997, 1999)

Pediatric Emergency Medicine and Critical Care Research Award, AAP(1996)

Fellow’s Teaching Award, Children’s Hospital, Boston, MA(1992)

Outstanding Teaching Resident Award, Dept of Pediatrics, Harbor-UCLA, Torrance, CA(1987, 1989)

Alpha Omega Alpha Medical Honor Society, UC San Francisco School of Medicine(1985)
