= Simonetta Moro =

Italian artist and academic administrator

- Born: Italy
- Education: Accademia di Belle Arti di Bologna; University of Southampton; University of Central Lancashire
- Known for: Cartographic aesthetics, painting, drawing, and philosophy
- Website: simonettamoro.com

Simonetta Moro is an Italian and American visual artist, scholar, and academic administrator. She is the current President and a Professor of Art, Philosophy, and Visual Studies at the Institute for Doctoral Studies in the Visual Arts (IDSVA). Her work focuses on cartographic aesthetics, painting, and the philosophical intersections of memory and place.

== Early life and education ==
Moro was born in Italy and received her initial artistic training at the Accademia di Belle Arti di Bologna, where she graduated magna cum laude with a thesis on “Mark Rothko and the experience of the sacred in painting.” She later moved to the United Kingdom, earning a Master of Arts from the Winchester School of Art at the University of Southampton and a PhD in Fine Arts from the University of Central Lancashire, with a dissertation on “Reconstructing Babel.” Between 1997 and 2004 she attended several classes at the Internationalen Sommerakademie für bildende Kunst Salzburg, studying with Jim Dine, Jacobo Borges, Ilya Kabakov, Emilia Kabakov, and Marjetica Potrc. In 2003, she was a resident at the Skowhegan School of Painting and Sculpture in Maine.

== Academic career ==
From 2003 to 2012, she served as an Assistant Professor at Eugene Lang College, where she developed and chaired their visual art program, and Parsons School of Design in New York City. At Eugene Lang, she founded and curated the Skybridge Art & Sound Space. In 2012, she joined the Institute for Doctoral Studies in the Visual Arts (IDSVA), serving as Director and Vice President for Academic Affairs before being named president in 2024, succeeding founding president George Smith.

== Artistic and Scholarly Work ==
Moro’s artistic practice often utilizes "mapping" as a primary aesthetic and theoretical tool. Her drawings, prints, paintings, and mappings depict the flow of change, landmasses, the depth of history, and psychological states or memory.

Her work has been exhibited internationally, including at White Box (New York), the American Academy in Rome, and various venues across Europe. She was a Fulbright Fellow at the American Academy in Rome from 1999 to 2000.

As a scholar, she has published extensively on the relationship between art and cartography. Her notable publications include:

- Mapping Paradigms in Modern and Contemporary Art: Poetic Cartography (Routledge, 2021)
- The Vattimo Dictionary (Edinburgh University Press, 2023)
