= Rudi Cormane =

Dutch dermatologist (1925–1987)

- Born: 7 April 1925; Bandung, Indonesia
- Died: 18 February 1987 (aged 61)
- Education: University of Leiden
- Known for: Research in immunofluorescence
- Medical career
- Profession: Dermatologist
- Institutions: University of Leiden; University of Utrecht
- Sub-specialties: Autoimmune skin disease

Rudi Harold Cormane (7 April 1925 – 18 February 1987) was a Dutch dermatologist who pioneered research in immunofluorescence studies of the skin.

During the Second World War he was interned in a Japanese camp where he received an education from other prisoners. After the war he gained entry to the University of Leiden in the Netherlands to study medicine, but it was interrupted in 1947 when an epidemic of polio caused paralysis of his legs.

He trained in dermatology at Leiden, eventually becoming the head of the Department of Dermatology at the University of Utrecht. Throughout his career, he did pioneering work in the then new developments in immunofluorescence studies of the skin, and much research in the Autoimmune skin disease origin of many skin diseases including lupus erythematosus, dermatitis herpetiformis and many autoimmune bullous diseases.

== Early life and education ==
Cormane was born on 7 April 1925 in Bandung, Indonesia, to a manager of a plantation and his wife. At the time, the region was known as the Dutch East Indies.

By 1942, the Second World War had extended to the area, and Cormane was imprisoned in a Japanese camp. Here, older prisoners provided him with sufficient education to enable him to enter the University of Leiden in 1946. He graduated in 1953.

His studies were interrupted after he contracted polio during a 1947 epidemic which necessitated intensive treatment in Switzerland for paralysis of his legs.

== Career ==
In 1956, Cormane established the Laboratory of Fungal Diseases of the Department of Dermatology at the Department of Microbial Diseases, headed by W.R.O. Goslings. Here, he researched and wrote his thesis on "Candida albicans en de therapie met antibiotica" (Candida albicans and treatment with antibiotics). After graduation, he trained at the Department of Internal Medicine at the University of Leiden when it was headed by J. Mulder and A. Querido, being appointed to its staff as a specialist in 1958. In 1960, the Head of the Department of Dermatology at the University of Utrecht, L. H. Jansen, invited Cormane to become a resident, following which he became a specialist in dermatology and venereology, and was three years later appointed to its staff.

He authored many articles on enzyme histochemical studies of the skin and nephelometric studies of serum in drug allergy between 1956 and 1963.

=== Immunofluorescence ===
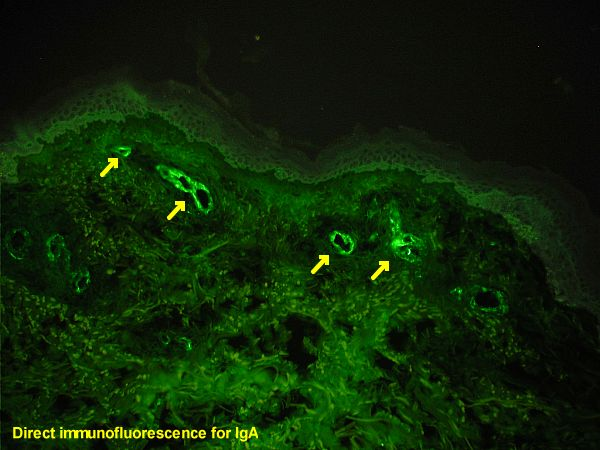
Modern image of a histological section of human skin prepared for direct immunofluorescence using an anti-IgA antibody.

Cormane became active in the then new developments in immunofluorescence studies of the skin, resulting in his classic article in 1964, "Bound globulin in the skin of patients with chronic discoid lupus erythematosus and systemic lupus erythematosus". He pioneered much research in the autoimmune origin of many skin diseases including lupus erythematosus, pemphigus, pemphigoid, and other autoimmune bullous diseases.

He was appointed chairman of the Department of Dermatology at the Binnengasthuis, University of Amsterdam professor in dermatology and venereology in 1967, and in the same year, reported his initial results of immunoglobulin deposition in the skin in dermatitis herpetiformis, proving the deposition of IgA in the skin of these people.

Often invited to speak internationally, one memorable visit was in 1982 when, as a former prisoner of war, he was invited to Japan.

== Personal ==
Cormane enjoyed music and played the flute. He also kept a collection of cloisonné pottery. He never married.

== Death and legacy ==
Cormane co-founded the European Society of Dermatological Research, the annual meetings initially always took place in Amsterdam to avoid "scientific tourism." The Rudi Cormane Lecture is given in his honour.

Cormane's plan was to retire to Thailand; however, he died from a cardiac arrest on 18 February 1987.

== Selected publications ==
=== Books ===
- Immunology and Skin Diseases, Volume 15 of Current topics in immunology. Edward Arnold, 1981. (With Syed Shafi, Asghar). ISBN 9780713143461.

=== Articles ===
- Cormane RH (1962). "Comparative enzyme-histochemical studies of the human skin (normal and abnormal)". Dermatologica. 124: 359–66. doi:10.1159/000255089. PMID 13881350.
- Cormane RH (1964). ""BOUND" GLOBULIN IN THE SKIN OF PATIENTS WITH CHRONIC DISCOID LUPUS ERYTHEMATOSUS AND SYSTEMIC LUPUS ERYTHEMATOSUS". Lancet. 1: 534–5. doi:10.1016/s0140-6736(64)92917-4. PMID 14100191.
- Cormane RH, Ballieux RE, Kalsbeek GL, Hymans W (1966). "Classification of immunoglobulins in the dermo-epidermal junction in lupus erythematosus". Clin Exp Immunol. 1: 207–12. PMC 1579176. PMID 4161909.
- Cormane RH, Bruinsma W (1970). "Exchange autografts of skin in lupus erythematosus". Ann Clin Res. 2: 22–7. PMID 4393043.
