= Jim Cooperman =

Jim Cooperman is an American Canadian author and conservationist. A resident of Shuswap Lake in the British Columbia interior region, Cooperman writes on local area history, natural history, and conservation issues.

== Early life ==
Cooperman left California in the late 1960s as a conscientious objector to the Vietnam war. Cooperman built a log home in Lee Creek on the north shore of Shuswap Lake, and worked as a teacher, log-cabin builder, editor, and consultant before turning to documenting local history, geography, and biology.

== Writing and activism ==
In 1989, Cooperman and six others formed the Shuswap Environmental Action Society (SEAS). The group has lobbied for more parks and protected areas in the region, and have worked with forestry companies and the provincial government to save stands of old-growth trees in the watershed. In the 2000s, SEAS was involved in opposition to commercial and residential development at the mouth of the Adams River, a tributary to Shuswap Lake and one of the largest sockeye salmon spawning grounds in the world. Cooperman has a regular column for the regional newspaper Shuswap Market News (an imprint of the Salmon Arm Observer) called "Shuswap Passion". In 2017, he condensed and compiled writing from that column into the first major publication on the Shuswap region, entitled Everything Shuswap. It is the first installment of a series of three "geographical handbooks" on the topic.
