= Fred Kupferman =

French historian (1934–1988)

- Born: 25 January 1934; Paris, France
- Died: 27 April 1988 (aged 54); Paris, France
- Occupation: Historian
- Spouse: Sigrid Kupferman
- Children: Laurent Kupferman
- Parent(s): Israël Kupferman; Frania Rothblum-Propper

Fred Kupferman (25 January 1934 – 27 April 1988) was a French historian.

== Biography ==
He was Jewish, and he was forced to wear a yellow badge during World War II. He lost his father in the Holocaust.

Kupferman was a professor of history at Sciences Po and the University of Paris. He was the author of several history books about Vichy France. He also co-wrote two children's books with his wife. Kupferman had a wife, Sigrid. He died on 27 April 1988 in Paris, France.

== Works ==
=== History books ===
- Kupferman, Fred (1976). Pierre Laval. Paris: Masson. ISBN 9782225451553. OCLC 2838381.
- Kupferman, Fred (1979). Au pays des Soviets : le voyage français en Union soviétique : 1917-1939. Paris: Gallimard. ISBN 9782070290024. OCLC 708289949.
- Kupferman, Fred (1980). Le procès de Vichy : Pucheu, Pétain, Laval : 1944-1945. Bruxelles: Editions Complexe. ISBN 9782870270523. OCLC 14211950.
- Derogy, Jacques; Kupferman, Fred; Misrachi, Arianne (1980). Le cas Wallenberg. Paris: Ramsay. OCLC 7203067.
- Kupferman, Fred (1982). Mata Hari : songes et mensonges. Bruxelles: Editions Complexe. ISBN 9782870271001. OCLC 405647970.
- Kupferman, Fred (1985). Les premiers beaux jours, 1944-1946. Paris: Calmann-Lévy. ISBN 9782702113721. OCLC 13245611.

=== Children's books ===
- Kupferman, Fred; Kupferman, Sigrid (1986). La Nuit des dragons. Paris: Librairie générale française. ISBN 9782253039525. OCLC 420115931.
- Kupferman, Fred; Kupferman, Sigrid (1988). Le complot du télégraphe. Paris: Hachette. ISBN 9782010138386. OCLC 70395807.
