= Coppermine =

Coppermine may refer to:

- Coppermine Peninsula, Antarctica
- Alanngorsuaq Fjord, also known as Coppermine Bay, Greenland
- Coppermine Herald, one of the heralds at the Canadian Heraldic Authority
- Coppermine expedition (1819–1822), a British overland undertaking to survey and chart the area from Hudson Bay to the north coast of North America, eastwards from the mouth of the Coppermine River.
- Coppermine River Group, a sequence of Mesoproterozoic continental flood basalts, Nunavut and the Northwest Territories
- Coppermine River, in Nunavut and the Northwest Territories
- Kugluktuk, Nunavut, formerly known as Coppermine
- Pentium III, a microprocessor code-named "Coppermine"

== See also ==
- Copper extraction
