= Thierry Mauvignier =

French director and documentary filmmaker (born 1965)

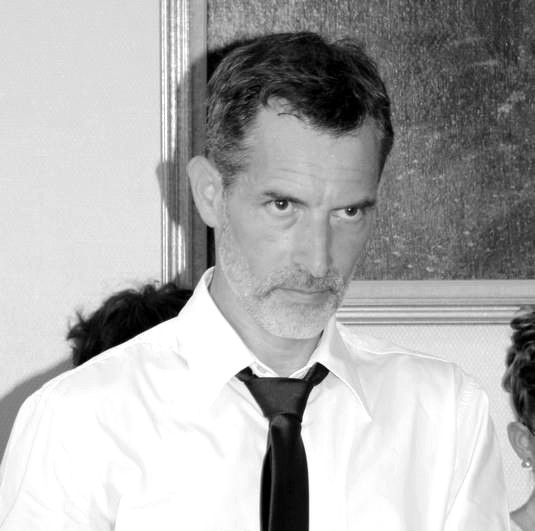
- Born: 1965 (age 60–61); Tours, France
- Occupations: Director, producer
- Years active: 1997–present
- Known for: La légende de Thierry Mauvignier
- Family: Laurent Mauvignier (brother)

Thierry Mauvignier (French pronunciation: [tjɛʁi moviɲje]; born 1965) is a French director and documentary filmmaker. He began his career as a projectionist for Futuroscope and made a few short films for France 3 before embarking on documentaries and fiction. He is the brother of writer Laurent Mauvignier.

== Biography ==
Thierry Mauvignier grew up near Tours, alongside his two brothers, the writer Laurent Mauvignier and the director Frédéric Mauvignier, as well as two sisters. Already very young, he was passionate about cinema.

I was drawn to cinema from a very young age. I didn't have a camera, but I made projectors out of cardboard and a magnifying glass. I designed my own slideshows, I was passionate about cinema and films like The Hunchback left their mark on me. I also really liked the Belmondos.

— Reported by Daniel Biron

He started directing and then obtained his BTS Audiovisuel. In 1997, he directed his very first short film L'heure c'est l'heure with his nephews and nieces as actors . He then went on to produce several short films as well as documentaries with sound engineer Michel Duponteil. At the same time, he writes books for young people and works as a videographer. In 2021, he directed a short film on a Poitevin legend which he revisits with the help of his brother Laurent Mauvignier, entitled the legend of the murderous lords and appears in the documentary feature film La légende de Thierry Mauvignier. directed by Dylan Besseau. He draws his inspiration from nature and the animal world, in particular that of wolves, long fascinated by the legends that surround him, he has devoted a major part of his work to this subject.

== Director ==
- 1997 : It's time, short film France 3
- 1998 : Death at your fingertips, short film France 3
- 1999 : I would go to the seaside, short film
- 2003 : René Descartes, documentary
- 2006 : The Cinematograph, from shadow to light, documentary
- 2007 : Harvests of yesteryear, documentary
- 2007 : Stroll between Pinail and Moulière, documentary
- 2007 : Stroll along the Clain, documentary
- 2007 : Running the marathon, documentary
- 2008 : The Forgotten of Laos or the Maquis of Indochina co-directed with Christophe Guyonnaud, documentary
- 2008 : Walk in the land of the monkeys, documentary
- 2008 : Canis lupus, said the wolf with the voice of Pascal Durand, documentary
- 2021 : The legend of the murderous lords (short film) with Frans Boyer, Yannick Jaulin, Michel Cordeboeuf, Joël Pyrène, Franck Beckmann, co-written with Laurent Mauvignier.

== Writer ==
- 2005 : Canaïs the cub and Little Red Riding Hood adaptation of Jacob Grimm and Wilhelm Grimm

== Participations ==
- 2021 : La légende de Thierry Mauvignier
- 2022 : Interview with Thierry Mauvignier
