= Bande à part (magazine) =

French film journal

- Categories: Film magazine
- Frequency: Monthly
- First issue: 2013
- Country: France
- Based in: Paris
- Language: French
- Website: www.bande-a-part.fr

Bande à part is a French film magazine originally designed to be viewed on a tablet computer. Launched in 2013, it was the first such magazine in France.

== History ==
In 2013, Bande à part became the first cinema magazine specifically designed for tablet computers in France. Unlike simple PDF versions of print magazines or adaptations of existing websites, the magazine plays with formatting and content presentation, while offering a touch navigation mode adaptable to different reading styles. Drawing inspiration from the Apple iPad's release in 2010, Anne-Claire Cieutat and Fouzi Louahem created a magazine that leverages tablet graphics for a cinematic approach, breaking away from traditional criticism. The title of the magazine is directly inspired by the Louvre traversal sequence in the film of the same name by Jean-Luc Godard—in which the main characters dash through the halls of the famous museum.

== Publications ==
Bande à part is one of the 55 websites used for film ratings on AlloCiné in the press review section.

== Distinctions ==
- Digital Magazine Awards 2013: "Best New Magazine" Award.
- Digital Magazine Awards 2014: "Best Magazine for Film, TV, and Entertainment" Award.
