= Musée de la Franc-Maçonnerie =

Museum of Freemasonry in Paris, France

Museum of Freemasonry
- Musée de la Franc-Maçonnerie
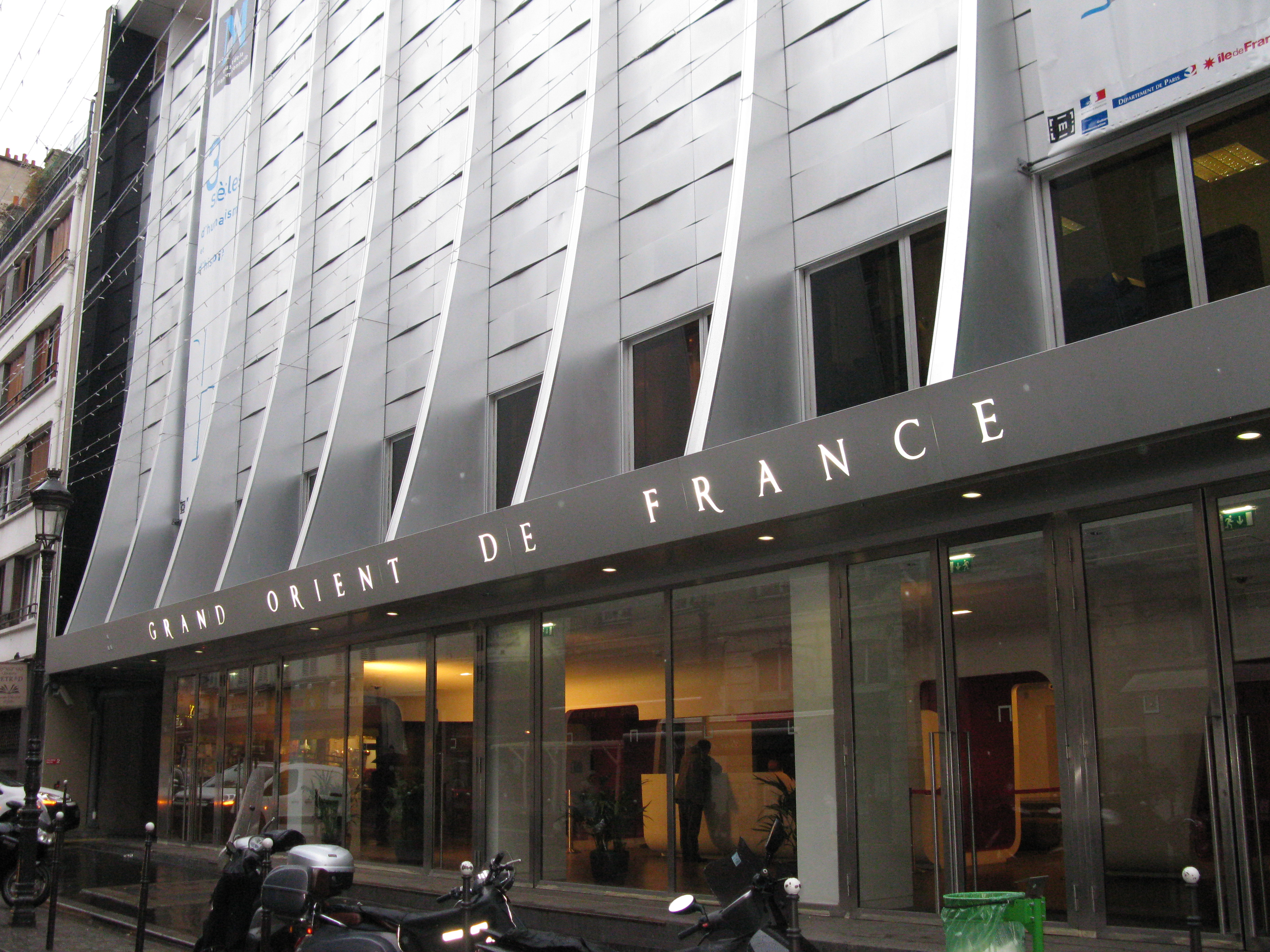
- Established: 1889
- Location: 9th arrondissement of Paris, France
- Coordinates: 48.8749°N 2.3431°E
- Founder: Grand Orient de France
- Director: Pierre Mollier le Cavailler

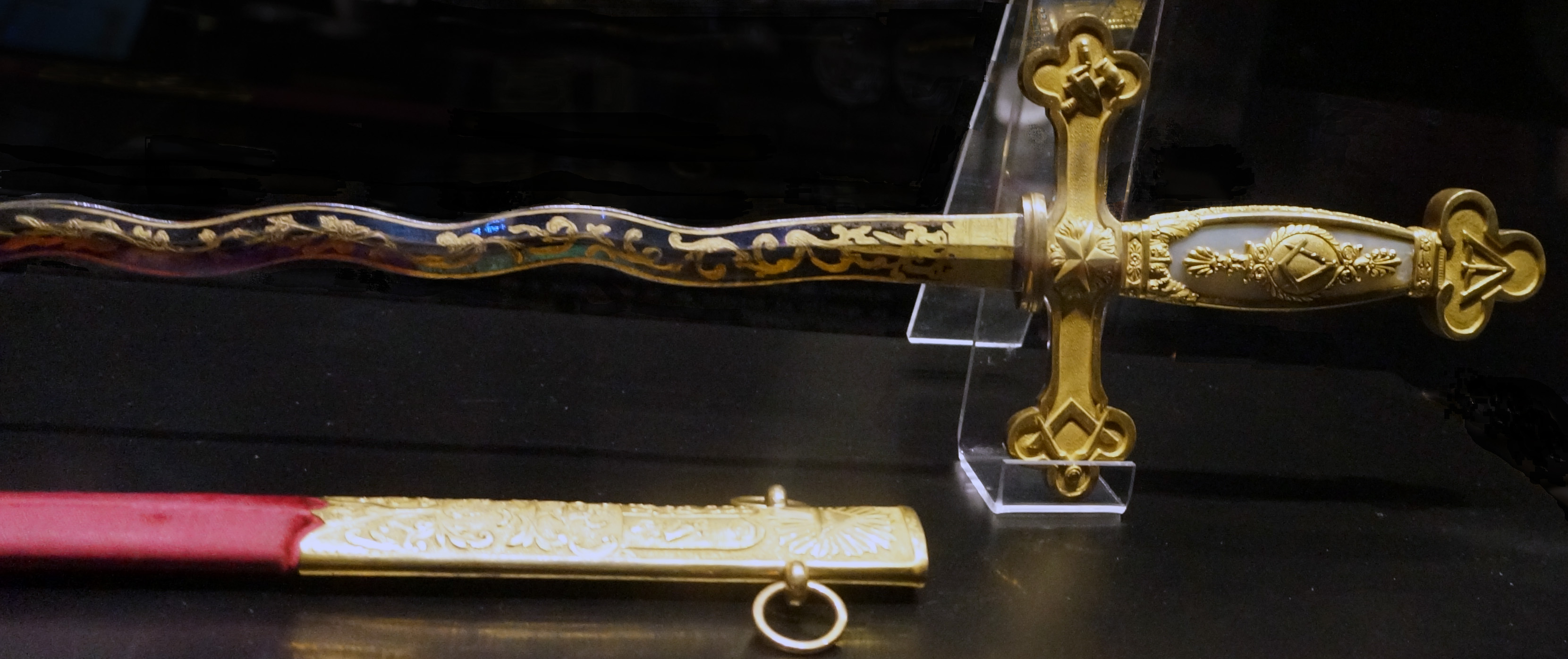
La Fayette sword.

The Musée de la Franc-Maçonnerie (French pronunciation: [myze də la fʁɑ̃ masɔnʁi], Museum of Freemasonry) is a museum of Freemasonry located in the 9th arrondissement at 16, rue Cadet, Paris, France. It is open daily except Sundays and Mondays; an admission fee is charged. The closest métro station is Cadet. The museum was established in 1889 by the Grand Orient de France as a cabinet of curiosities in the Hotel Cadet. It was despoiled in the German occupation of France during World War II but reopened in 1973, and in 2000, became an official museum of France. In that same year, many of its historical documents were returned from Moscow, where they had been held by the KGB after Germany's defeat in World War II. The museum reopened to the public on February 11, 2010, after extensive renovations. It has the support of the Ministry of Culture, the Île-de-France region and the town hall of Paris.

Today, the museum presents the history of French Freemasonry through its symbols, grades, documents, and objects. It contains approximately 10,000 items displayed in permanent exhibit space (800 m^{2}), about 23,000 volumes in its archives (400 m^{2}), and a further 400 m^{2} dedicated to temporary exhibits. Among the historically important items in its collection are Voltaire's masonic apron (1778), Lafayette's masonic sword, a first edition of James Anderson's Constitutions of the Free Masons (1723), satirical prints by William Hogarth (1697―1764), Meissen porcelain figurine (1740), etc.

== See also ==
- List of museums in Paris

== Bibliography ==
- Musée du Grand Orient de France et de la Franc-Maçonnerie européenne, Musée du Grand Orient de France, 95 pages, ca. 1985.
