= Makiko Furuichi =

Japanese-born French painter (born 1987)

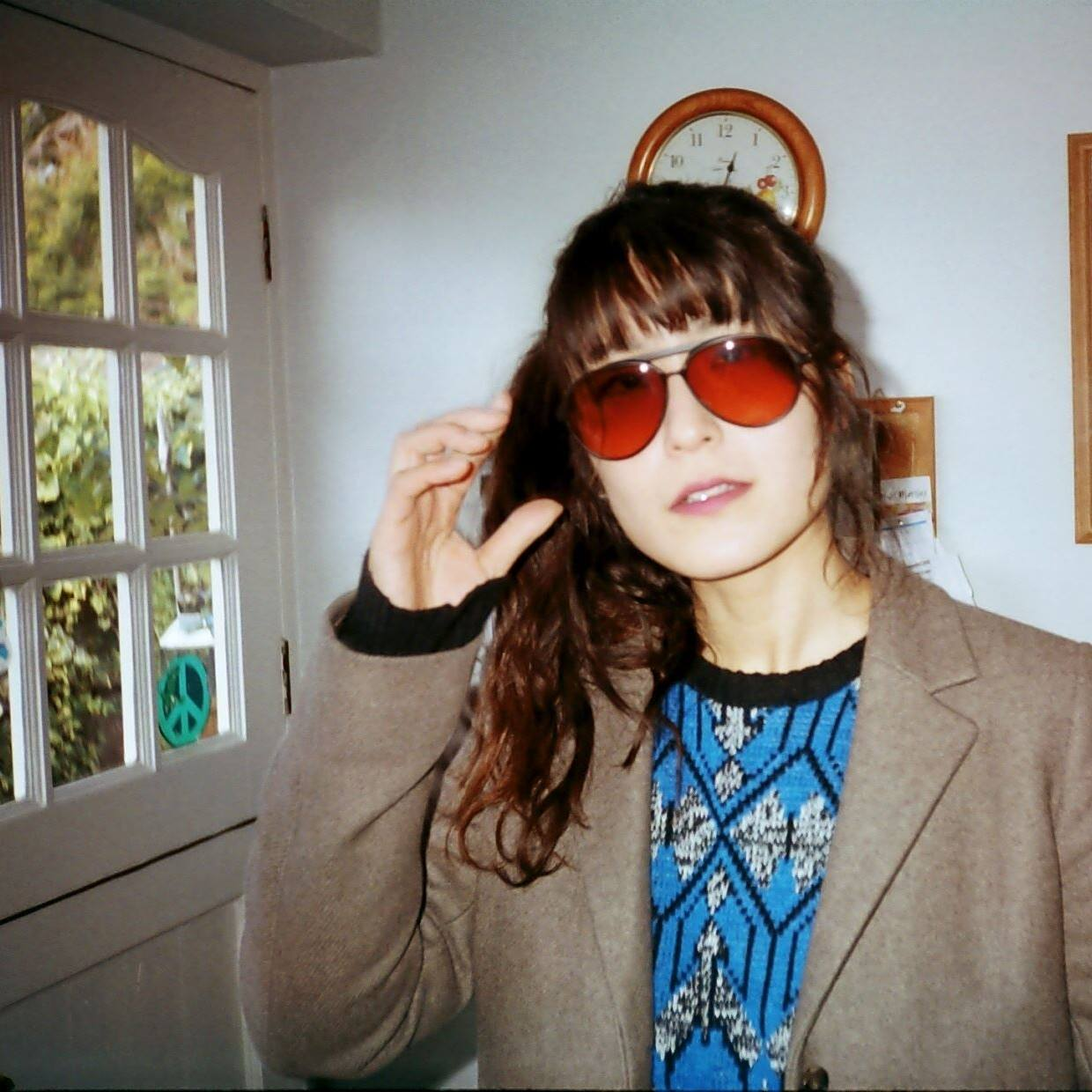
- Born: 1987 (age 37–38); Kanazawa, Japan
- Known for: Painting
- Awards: Grand prize, Four National Japanese Art Schools exhibition (Kanazawa)

Makiko Furuichi (born in 1987) is a Japanese-born French painter.

== Biography ==
Makiko Furuichi was born in 1987, in Kanazawa. She studied at the Kanazawa College of Art before moving to Nantes, France, to continue her studies at the Nantes Saint-Nazaire School of Fine Arts. She obtained her Higher national diploma in plastic expression in 2011.

== Career ==
In 2018, she exhibited at the FRAC des Pays de la Loire.

In 2021, she was selected by the jury of the Maison Ackerman for the seventh season of the artist residency to create a unique contemporary artwork in the Ackerman cellars.

In 2022, she renovated the bell of the Abbey of Our Lady of Fontevraud, adorned with a dragon that she named Pétronille.

In 2023, she exhibited her collection Ciel poilu, pluie chaude at the Musée Marc Chagall as part of the anniversary exhibition Chagall et moi! marking the museum's 50th anniversary. She also created an original work for the project Les Arts au fil de l'eau for the Val d'Ille-Aubigné Community of Communes in partnership with 40mcube. Also in 2023, she was the main subject in the documentary Makiko directed by Antoine Godet. On 28 August 2023, she painted a giant mural on Avenue Léon-Blum in Saint-Nazaire.

== Works ==
=== Public works ===
- 2021: 53-meter mural in the Ackerman cellars
- 2022: Pétronille, bell of the Abbey of Our Lady of Fontevraud
- 2023: Ciel poilu, pluie chaude, at the Marc-Chagall Museum
- 2023: Les Arts au fil de l'eau, Val d'Ille-Aubigné Community of Communes in partnership with 40mcube

=== Solo exhibitions ===
- 2015: Smoker’s forest (invade3, Tokyo), Ciel Poilu (Gallery 5UN7, Bordeaux), Muscles (3e Parallèle, Paris)
- 2016: Débilité (Pannonica, Nantes)
- 2017: Rêve gris (Sill, Nantes), Boss (3e Parallèle, Paris), Cheval Rétréci (HAUS, Nantes)
- 2018: KAKI Kukeko (Frac des Pays de la Loire, Carquefou), Thief of hand (Wish Less, Tokyo)
- 2019: L’Age de Raisin (Axenéo7, Gatineau, Canada)
- 2021: Rêverie détrempée (Le Carré, Château-Gontier sur Mayenne), Toute Petite Amazonie (Espace MIRA, Nantes), Suru Suru (Gallery Vachet-Delmas, Sauve)
- 2022: (Wish Less, Tokyo)

=== Group exhibitions ===
- 2011: Eizo ten (Art space kimura ASK?, Tokyo)
- 2012: Nouvel Accent (Cosmopolis, Nantes), Pintzelen zarata, mailu isiltasuna (Mille feuilles, Nantes)
- 2013: Salve pour un temps présent (Syndicat Potentiel, Strasbourg), Peu Familier (Space No wave / Artmonde, Seoul), Décongélations prématurées (Atelier Alain Lebras, Nantes)
- 2014: Chambre Charbon (Wish Less, Tokyo), Tourisme en Allergie (IRS, Nantes), La Chasse aux fauves (Dulcie Galerie, Nantes)
- 2015: Dans mes yeux (Bureau d’Art et de Recherche, Roubaix), Salon ddessins (Atelier Richelieu, Paris), Innocence (Temple du Goût, Nantes)
- 2016: Maison brûlée (Le Kalif, Rouen), Quelque chose mettra fin à l’ennui (3e Pararelle, Paris), Salon ddessins (Atelier Richelieu, Paris)
- 2017: Doloris (Fragile, Nantes), Nix (Les Réalisateurs, Nantes), Mémoires suspendues (Galerie Detais, Guido Romero Pierini, Paris)
- 2018: Realms II (Gordon Snelgrove Gallery, Canada)
- 2019: Yoann Estevenin + Makiko Furuichi (Galerie Guido Romero Pierini, Paris), Je suis dans le tableau... (Atelier Bonus, Nantes), Nazcas Festival (Brasseries Atlas, Brussels)
- 2020: Pharmakon Chain Reaction (Atelier Mitsushima, Kyoto, Japan), INTER_ (Visual Arts Prize of the City of Nantes, L’Atelier, Nantes)
- 2021: I Believe I Can Fly (Le Port des Créateurs, Toulon)

=== Participations ===
- 2025: Makiko, feature-length documentary by Antoine Godet

=== Awards, collections ===
- 2008: ASK? Film Festival 2008 (Art space kimura ASK?, Tokyo)
- 2008: Grand Prize, Four National Japanese Art Schools exhibition (Kanazawa)
- 2018: Winner of the Visual Arts Prize of the City of Nantes
- 2020: Artdeliver Collection, Art Library of Nantes
- 2021: Collection of the Ille-et-Vilaine Departmental Fund for Contemporary Art
- 2021: Collection of the Regional Contemporary Art Fund of the Pays de la Loire
- 2023: Collection of the Marc-Chagall Museum (Nice)

== Family ==
Makiko is the granddaughter of the painter Minokichi Yasui, the first disciple of Ryusei Kishida.
