= Forces occultes =

1943 French film

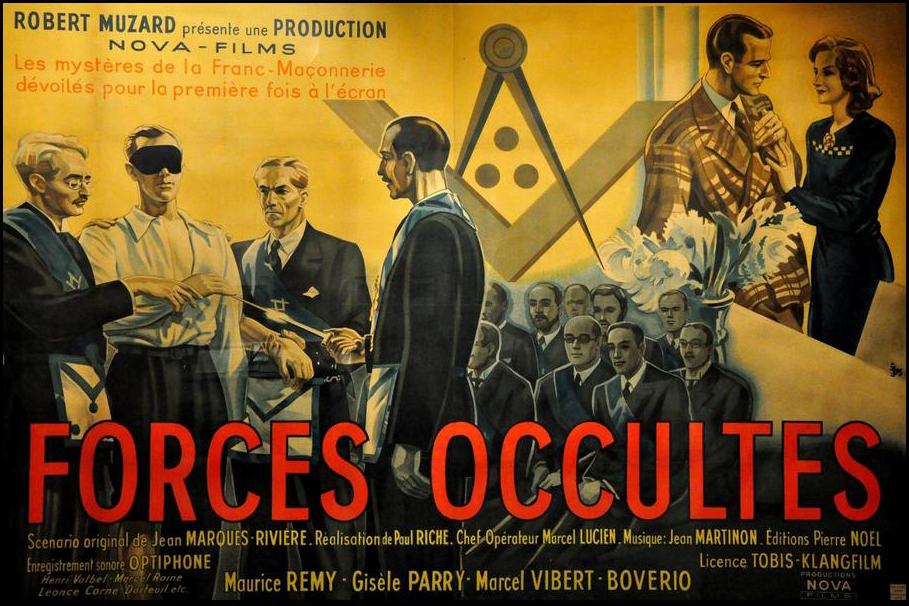
- Directed by: Jean Mamy
- Written by: Jean Marquès-Rivière
- Produced by: Robert Muzard
- Cinematography: Marcel Lucien (photography)
- Music by: Jean Martinon
- Distributed by: Nova films
- Release date: 10 March 1943
- Running time: 53 minutes
- Country: Vichy France
- Language: French

Forces Occultes (Occult Forces – subtitled The Mysteries of Freemasonry Unveiled for the First Time on the Screen) is a French film of 1943, notable as the last film to be directed by Paul Riche (the pseudonym of Jean Mamy).

== Plot ==
The film recounts the life of Mr. Avenel, a young member of parliament who joins the Freemasons in order to relaunch his career. He thus learns of how the Freemasons are conspiring with the Jews and the Anglo-American nations to encourage France into a war against Germany.

== History ==
The film was commissioned in 1942 by the Propaganda Abteilung, a delegation of Nazi Germany's propaganda ministry within occupied France by the ex-Mason, Mamy. It virulently denounces Freemasonry, parliamentarianism, and Judaism as part of Vichy's drive against them and seeks to prove a Jewish-Masonic plot.

On France's liberation, its writer Jean Marquès-Rivière, its producer Robert Muzard, and its director Jean Mamy were purged for collaboration with the enemy. On 25 November 1945, Muzard was condemned to 3 years in prison and Marquès-Rivière was condemned in his absence (he had gone into self-imposed exile) to death and degradation.

Mamy had also been a journalist on L'Appel under Pierre Constantini (leader of the Ligue française d’épuration, d’entraide sociale et de collaboration européenne) and on the collaborationist journal Au pilori, and was thus condemned to death and executed at the fortress of Montrouge on 29 March 1949.

== Cast ==
- Maurice Rémy as Pierre Avenel
- Marcel Vibert
- Auguste Bovério as Bovério
- Gisèle Parry as Madame Avenel
- Léonce Corne
- Pierre Darteuil
- Marcel Raine
- Louise Flavie
- Simone Arys
- Colette Darfeuil
- Henri Valbel
