= Freemasonry during World War II =

Masons in World War II

'Freemasonry' during World War II faced suppression and bans in most European countries. It was the target of intense anti-Masonic propaganda from the rise of the first totalitarian regimes in the early 1930s. Special laws equated it with an alleged Jewish conspiracy, and it suffered widespread persecution during World War II in every European country under Nazi occupation. After the war, European Freemasonry—almost completely destroyed—took many years to reconstitute itself, revive the work in its lodges, and renew its membership.

== History ==
During the First World War, Masonic obediences generally supported their respective nations. In contrast, in the first half of the 20th century, Freemasonry confronted the establishment of authoritarian and totalitarian regimes across Europe, which led to its near-total disappearance from the continent. These regimes eliminated virtually all civil liberties by abolishing democratic representation, with Freemasonry among the earliest victims. Fascist, Nazi, and Communist dictatorships systematically eradicated lodges and Masonic obediences in large-scale repressive campaigns. The Francoist regime, through a clericalism intimately tied to the dictatorship, reached extremes of repression and made Freemasonry a primary target.

Thus, more or less radically, Freemasonry gradually vanished from authoritarian Europe beginning in 1919 with Soviet Russia, continuing in Germany with its total ban in 1934, and culminating in 1939 with Franco’s advance in Spain. The Nazi invasions that began the Second World War ultimately caused the near-total destruction of European Freemasonry. The few countries that had escaped authoritarian drift were placed under Nazi occupation or, after military defeat, governed by collaborationist regimes that continued the eradication. After these periods of anti-Masonic persecution, the Masonic tradition—which in some countries dated to the 18th century—disappeared entirely.

=== Germany ===
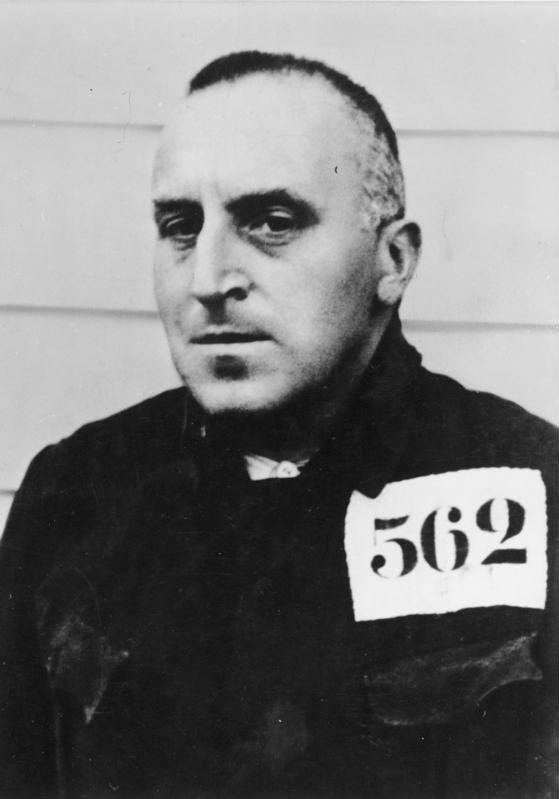
Prisoner 83-93516-0010, Carl von Ossietzky

When Adolf Hitler came to power in January 1933, anti-Masonry and antisemitism were already deeply entrenched in German society, promoted by conservative circles and the Nazis, who jointly denounced Freemasonry as a “tool in the hands of the Jews”. As early as 1931, Rudolf Hess had declared membership in Freemasonry and the Nazi Party incompatible. To counter rising anti-Masonry, leaders of the main “Prussian” German obediences attempted to appease the Nazi regime by redefining their orders as Christian and altering rituals to include references more aligned with Nazi ideology. The three major German Grand Lodges (Hamburg, the Three Globes, and the National Grand Lodge of Freemasons of Germany) transformed themselves into German-Christian orders with Templar connotations and telegraphed assurances of loyalty to Hitler. After severing ties with foreign Grand Lodges, they expelled Freemasons of Jewish descent or who had supported the Weimar Republic.

Despite these concessions, German Freemasonry did not escape the continent-wide destruction. Violence against members began in February 1933; property was looted, and arrests and deportations were widespread. All Grand Lodges ceased activity. An ordinance signed by Hermann Göring in 1934 ordered the dissolution of all lodges. The Prussian Grand Lodges held their final meeting on 9 August 1935. Documentation known in 2018 records 1,265 Freemasons who died under Nazi repression, most of them Jewish or Weimar supporters. Among the victims was pacifist writer and 1935 Nobel Peace Prize laureate Carl von Ossietzky. German Freemasonry was the first to disappear from Europe, well before the war began. It survived only fragmentarily through a few lodges opened in Palestine or South America by the “Humanitarian” current (close to liberal French obediences), comprising eight obediences and about 18,000 members. These chose self-dissolution on German soil immediately after Hitler’s rise.

=== Spain ===
The Spanish dictator Francisco Franco's persistent hatred was evident even in his final speeches before his death. Since its inception, the Franco regime had demonstrated a relentless anti-Masonic stance, (Note: Hivert-Messeca 2015, pp. 15–16, Préface, l'Europe sous l'acacia) which was in line with the national-Catholic and anti-revolutionary spirit that characterized the foundation of Franco's dictatorship. (Note: Hivert-Messeca 2015, p. 187) Following Franco's victory, agencies and delegations were set up in 1937 and 1938 to collect all Masonic documents in the country, gathering more than five million items. On December 21, 1938, an executive order was issued mandating the destruction of all Masonic symbols, particularly in cemeteries. This executive order was followed by Franco's request for a law aimed at retrospectively repressing Freemasons. Although this law was not immediately adopted, the repression was crowned by a general law aimed at suppressing Freemasonry, communism, and all so-called clandestine societies that “express subversive ideas against religion and state institutions.” To enforce this law, a special court was established in June 1940. (Note: Hivert-Messeca 2015, p. 201)

Such court began its work in 1941 and handed down sentences of exile, relegation, and banishment from public office, condemning political exiles in absentia and even judging and sentencing them posthumously. Using seized documents, the court compiled more than 80,000 files on the 5,000 active members of Spanish Freemasonry in 1930. In its total repression, the court summoned all Masons, living or dead since the end of the 19th century, whether active, expelled, or resigned, and all were registered and convicted. (Note: Hivert-Messeca 2015, p. 203) This tribunal remained in force until 1963, when it was abolished after Franco realized that there were no more Freemasons, living or dead, to judge in Spain. (Note: Hivert-Messeca 2015, p. 205)

=== Romania ===
Before the war, Romanian Freemasonry was viewed by the Orthodox Church and nationalist circles as a sectarian threat to national and Christian values. On 11 March 1937 an Orthodox synod vehemently condemned “the sect”. The Church condemns it as a doctrine and an occult organization that aims to establish a universal and secular republic. (Note: Hivert-Messeca 2015, p. 176) King Carol, who abolished all forms of democratic political representation in 1938, appointed the Orthodox Patriarch of Romania as head of government. The Patriarch had become anti-Masonic, despite having been a member of the National Grand Lodge of Romania (GLNR) (Note: Hivert-Messeca 2015, p. 177) for a time. The situation of Jews, Freemasons, and Gypsies worsened under Ion Antonescu's government. The GLNR building was assigned to a civil court. An anti-Masonic exhibition was presented in Bucharest by Tom Petrescu, who published a book on the “Masonic conspiracy” that was reprinted several times until 1944, denouncing 1,500 Masons in its pages. Some were convicted and interned, others were summarily executed. (Note: Hivert-Messeca 2015, p. 178)

=== Norway ===
In April 1940, the armies of the Third Reich invaded Denmark and Norway. After several weeks of fighting, they occupied the entire countries. The Reich Commissioner in Norway, Josef Terboven, established a government led by the conservative Ingomf Christensen. In 1942, Vidkun Quisling, leader of the far-right Nasjonal Samling party, took power and immediately pursued a policy of active collaboration. (Note: Hivert-Messeca 2015, p. 233) In 1940, Norwegian Freemasonry was mainly represented by the Norwegian Order of Freemasons, which had around 10,000 members, and a thousand members of a small German-based order, the Grand Lodge of the North Star. From the beginning of the occupation, lodges were banned, the order's assets were inventoried, (Note: They are not being transferred to Germany.) and the Grand Masonic Temple in Oslo was requisitioned to house an anti-Masonic exhibition in 1940. The return of democracy in 1945 allowed for the reestablishment of the Norwegian order, headed by Jacob Hvinden Haug, a general who had been a prisoner of the German army from 1940 to 1945. (Note: Hivert-Messeca 2015, p. 234)

=== Netherlands ===
In May 1940, the Netherlands was invaded in a matter of days. Arthur Seyss-Inquart and Anton Mussert, leader of the nationalist movement, collaborated with the occupying forces in a project to Nazify society. Searches and seizures of Masonic premises began in June. In September 1940, the temple and museum of the main Dutch Masonic order in The Hague were raided, and the Grand Orient of the Netherlands was stripped of its property and archives, which were destroyed or transferred to Germany. At that time, the order had 4,100 members and 67 lodges.

The last act of obedience was the publication of a survival guide for its members. The Grand Master, former General Hermanus van Tongeren, who did not go into exile in London during the invasion, was arrested and deported to the Oranienburg Sachsenhausen camp. (Note: This camp was reserved for political deportees, and nearly half of the 200,000 internees perished there.) (Note: Hivert-Messeca 2015, p. 235) He died in this camp on March 29, 1941. However, Dutch Freemasonry continued to exist in the Dutch overseas territories, the Antilles, Guyana, South Africa, and the East Indies. The invasion of the island of Java by the Japanese army ended its presence in some of these territories and led to the internment of most Freemasons and the confiscation of their property. (Note: Hivert-Messeca 2015, p. 236)

=== Belgium ===
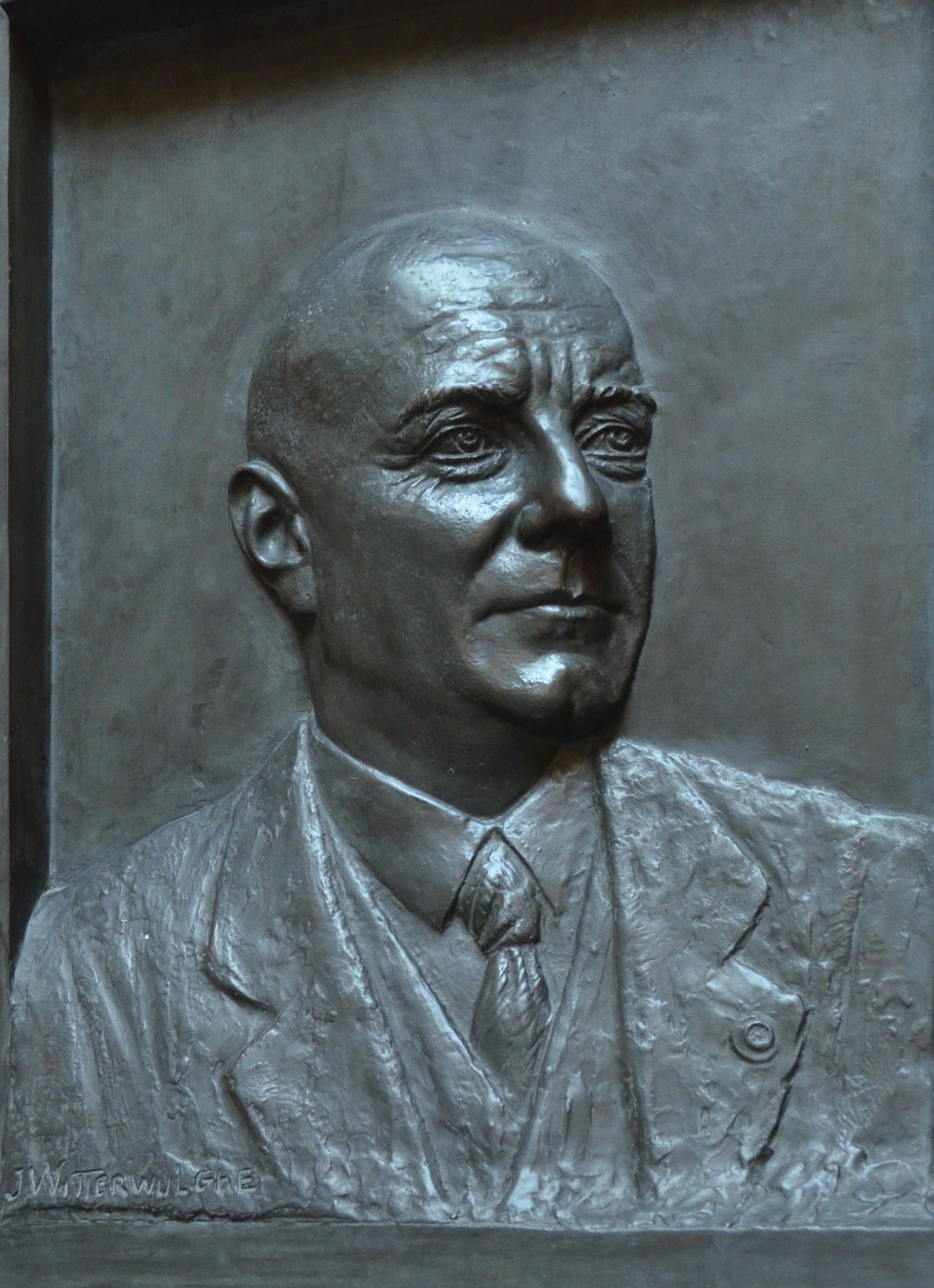
Jules Hiernaux

In May 1940, Belgium fell in two weeks and was placed under German military administration led by General von Falkenhausen. Building on pre-war far-right anti-Masonic hatred, (Note: Hivert-Messeca 2015, p. 237) the occupiers and Belgian collaborators (especially the Rexist movement) seized Masonic lodges, confiscated property, and looted archives. The Rex party took possession of the temple on Rue de Laeken, while another collaborating agency occupies the one on Rue du Persil.

In April 1940, collaborators founded the Belgian Anti-Masonic League, which organised a widely visited anti-Masonic exhibition in Brussels (later shown elsewhere), radio propaganda, public denunciations, and published lists of Freemasons. Freemasonry was officially banned on 20 August 1941, with remaining assets confiscated and archives sent to Germany. (Note: Hivert-Messeca 2015, p. 287) From then on, denunciations, arrests, and convictions were facilitated mainly by the collaborationist movements of Léon Degrelle and Staf de Clercq. Several assassinations were carried out, such as that of Georges Pètre, Grand Commander of the Supreme Council of Belgium, on May 31, 1942, lawyer Raoul Engel, former Grand Master of the Grand Orient of Belgium (GOB), killed on February 24, 1943, and Jules Hiernaux, former minister and also former Grand Master of the GOB, assassinated on July 29, 1944. As throughout Europe, Freemasons of the Jewish faith were deported. (Note: Hivert-Messeca 2015, p. 239)

=== Yugoslavia ===
Invaded in April 1941, Yugoslavia was dismantled. Slovenia was annexed by Germany and Freemasons immediately fell victim to the Reich's policies. A Croatian state was created and entrusted to Ante Pavelic's Ustasha Party. The first arrests were swift, with the Ustasha state interning around 40 Freemasons in the Jasenovac camp. Following various interventions, some were released in April 1942, but several were shot, including Count Josip Bombelles and lawyer Manko Galjardi. A few others also died as a result of their internment. All Freemasons of the Jewish faith were executed, such as physicist Slavko Hirsch and Ignjat Lang, president of the Jewish community of Vinkovci. (Note: Hivert-Messeca 2015, pp. 248–249)

In Serbia, the Germans found Milan Nedić to be a useful collaborator who served their military and political interests. The ultra-nationalist ZBOR movement led by Dimitrije Ljotić, with the help of the occupiers, set up a Serbian volunteer corps to fight communists. On October 22, 1941, a major anti-Masonic exhibition opened in Belgrade with the aim of exposing Jewish Freemasons and the Judeo-Communist conspiracy responsible for all the ills of Serbian society. A total of 60,000 posters and 200,000 leaflets attracted 80,000 visitors to the exhibition, which lasted three months. A series of anti-Masonic, anti-Semitic, and anti-Communist stamps were issued between 1941 and 1942. Banned since 1940, Yugoslav Freemasonry emerged from the war in a state of collapse. (Note: Hivert-Messeca 2015, p. 250) The country's history and the advent of a Soviet-style constitution promulgated in 1946 under Tito's presidency offered no respite for Freemasonry until his death in 1980. Considered a bourgeois structure, it ceased to exist in this country for nearly fifty years. (Note: Hivert-Messeca 2015, p. 252)

=== France ===
When the war began, anti-Masonic newspapers and publications accused Freemasons—especially the Grand Orient de France—of helping to cause the conflict and of promoting war in general. After the rapid defeat of the French armies in 1940, Paul Reynaud’s government could no longer continue the fight. The Chamber of Deputies, which had been elected during the left-wing Popular Front period, voted to grant full powers to Marshal Philippe Pétain.

Pétain strongly disliked Freemasonry and blamed it for many of France’s problems. Shortly after his government was established in Vichy, a law was prepared to outlaw secret societies, with Freemasons as the main target. The bill was presented on August 13, 1940, by Justice Minister Raphaël Alibert (a Catholic monarchist and antisemite) and Interior Minister Adrien Marquet (a former socialist mayor who collaborated with the new regime).

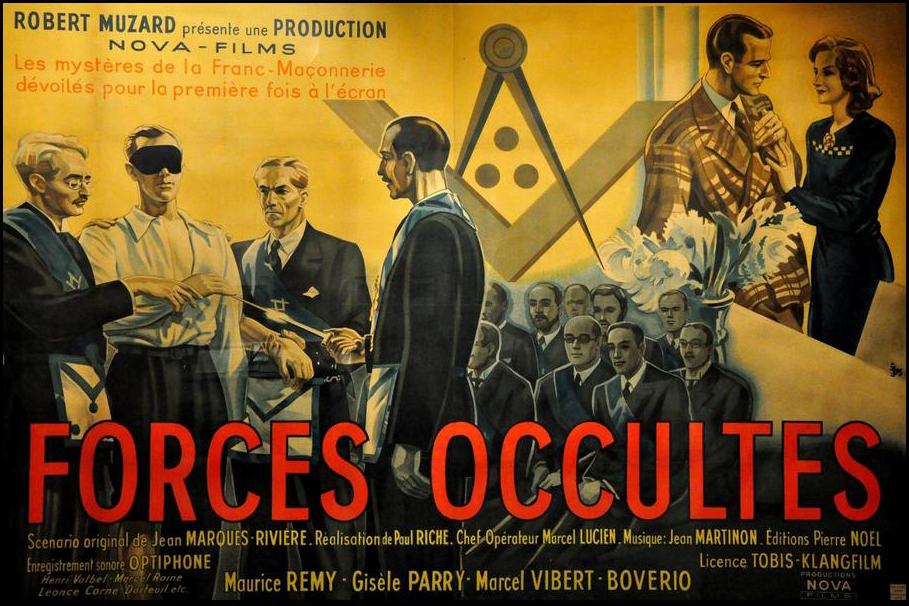
Poster for Forces occultes (1943), an anti-Masonic film directed by Jean Mamy.

The law of August 13, 1940, prohibited secret societies and allowed the government to seize their assets. It also made it illegal to restart or continue such organizations. Public employees were required to submit a written statement confirming they were not members and would never join one; failure to do so could result in losing their job. In December 1940, the Interior Ministry began investigating organizations covered by the new law. It compiled a list that consisted almost entirely of Masonic lodges, along with the Theosophical Society.

Three subsequent decrees officially banned all Masonic bodies. The first decree targeted the two largest organizations—the Grand Orient de France and the Grande Loge de France—while the second and third decrees outlawed and dissolved every remaining Masonic lodge, as well as smaller Masonic or related groups.

The goal of the Nazis and the Vichy regime was the total destruction of Freemasonry, which for them meant seizing all property belonging to Masonic orders and lodges. Property and archives were seized by the state property administration. In August and November 1941, new laws and provisions were implemented to tighten anti-Masonic legislation. A definition was developed to classify dignitaries of Masonic orders, enabling the publication of a list of 18,000 names. Three thousand public education officials were dismissed. (Note: Hivert-Messeca 2015, p. 267) In 1942, the French government and the Nazi propaganda department in France (Propaganda-Abteilung Frankreich) entrusted a film project to Robert Muzard, director of Nova-films. The film was directed by Paul Riche, a former Freemason of the Grand Orient de France who chose to collaborate. The screenplay was written by Jean Marquès-Rivière, also a Freemason of the Grande Loge de France, who turned to fascism and anti-Semitism. The film Forces occultes, which denounced “Jewish Freemasonry” whose secret agenda was to conspire against the state and the Church and serve the “republican plutocracy,” was released in Parisian theaters (Note: Hivert-Messeca 2015, p. 268) on March 9, 1943.

== See also ==
- Freemasonry during World War I
- Freemasonry in the French Third Republic
- Anti-Masonry
- French Resistance

== Bibliography ==
- Pierrat, Emmanuel (2016). Les francs-maçons sous l'Occupation: Entre résistance et collaboration (in French). Albin Michel. ISBN 978-2-226-32004-9.
- Hivert-Messeca, Yves (2015). 1914-1968. L'Europe sous l'acacia: Histoire de la franc-maçonnerie européenne du XVIIIe siècle à nos jours. L'univers maçonnique (in French). Éditions Dervy. ISBN 979-10-242-0135-1.
- Combes, André (2018). 1914-1968. La franc-maçonnerie, cœur battant de la république (in French). Éditions Dervy. ISBN 979-10-242-0246-4.
- Combes, André (2005). La franc-maçonnerie sous l'Occupation: Persécution et Résistance (1939-1945) (in French). Éditions du Rocher. ISBN 2-268-04112-3.
- Ligou, Daniel (2017). Histoire de la franc-maçonnerie française : La maçonnerie : Église de la République (in French). Librairie Arthème Fayard. ISBN 978-2-213-00162-3.
- Pierrat, Emmanuel (2017). Dictionnaire de la franc-maçonnerie (in French). Presses universitaires de France. ISBN 978-2-13-055094-5.
