= Jean Mamy =

Jean Mamy (8 July 1912, Chambéry, Savoie – 29 March 1949, Arcueil) was a French actor, producer, film and theatre director, screenwriter, film editor, journalist, and Nazi collaborator, notable for directing the anti-Masonic propaganda film Forces occultes under the pseudonym "Paul Riche".

He belonged to the inter-war left, acting in René Clair's 1924 Dada film Entr'acte and editing Jean Renoir's 1931 On purge bébé. Subsequently, he directed a number of films in the series "Une heure d'angoisse" based on the novels written by Marcel Allain for the Éditions Ferenczi. On the fall of France he decided on collaboration. His last film was the anti-Masonic 1943 film Forces occultes, which he directed (he had from 1931 to 1939 been Venerable of the Renan lodge of the Grand Orient de France, but had since parted company with Freemasonry). The film was commissioned in 1942 by the Propaganda Abteilung, a delegation of Nazi Germany's propaganda ministry within occupied France by the ex-Mason Mamy. It virulently denounces Freemasonry, parliamentarianism and Jews as part of Vichy's drive against them and seeks to prove a Jewish-Masonic plot.

Mamy had also been a journalist on the collaborationist periodical L'Appel under Pierre Constantini (leader of the Ligue française d’épuration, d’entraide sociale et de collaboration européenne) and on the collaborationist journal Au pilori. After being purged for collaboration with the enemy, he was condemned to death and executed at the fortress of Montrouge on 29 March 1949.

== Selected filmography ==
- Entr'acte (1924), as actor (uncredited)
- Misdeal (1928), as actor (uncredited) and production manager
- Black and White (1931), as sound editor
- Baby's Laxative (1931), as editor
- The Lovers of Midnight (1931), as editor
- Baleydier (1932), as director
- The Agony of the Eagles (1933), as editor
- The Path to Happiness (1934), as director
- The Secret of Polichinelle (1936), as editor
- A Picnic on the Grass (1937), as editor
- L'habit vert (The Green Jacket, 1937), as editor
- Forces occultes (1943), as director under the pseudonym Paul Riche.
