= Freemasonry during World War I =

History of the fraternal organization, 1914–1918

Freemasonry during World War I upheld its universalist principles, yet Freemasons in countries at war served their respective nations without restriction, thereby challenging the Lumières-derived principles of universal fraternity that have governed Freemasonry since its inception.

The networks it established before the outbreak of war served to foster hope for a pacifist solution to the global economic tensions that were being experienced at the time. Despite the absence of a formal agreement between Masonic currents, the organization supported internationalist and pacifist movements at the beginning of the 20th century. This was achieved by creating the Universal League of Freemasons during the 1st Esperanto Congress of 1905. Additionally, the Office of International Relations was established to unite the world's Grand Lodge. But this initiative did not fully achieve its primary goal and ceased to exist after the conflict. Attempts to foster closer relations between French and German Freemasonries to prevent a recurrence of armed conflict encountered significant obstacles, primarily due to the anti-Semitic rhetoric propagated by the press and the mistrust prevailing among both liberal and traditional obedience.

At the outset of the hostilities, each Masonic nation rallied behind its banner, each invoking self-defense and defense of humanity's values. The obedience of states that chose neutrality initiated or continued relations with other Masonic nations, sometimes from both camps. Despite the violent upheavals and confrontations caused by the conflict, Masonic obediences on all continents continued their activities, and some fraternal demonstrations even took place in prisoner-of-war camps.

Despite the ideal of universal fraternity being called into question by the actions of obedience that retreated to their respective national causes, from 1917 onward, as the end of the war approached, they placed their hopes in a new world that would be more just and enlightened. As with every significant upheaval since its inception, Freemasonry devised a future and course of action through its capacity to create new dynamics, drawing on both its ancient constitutions imbued with universalism and a utopian ideal.

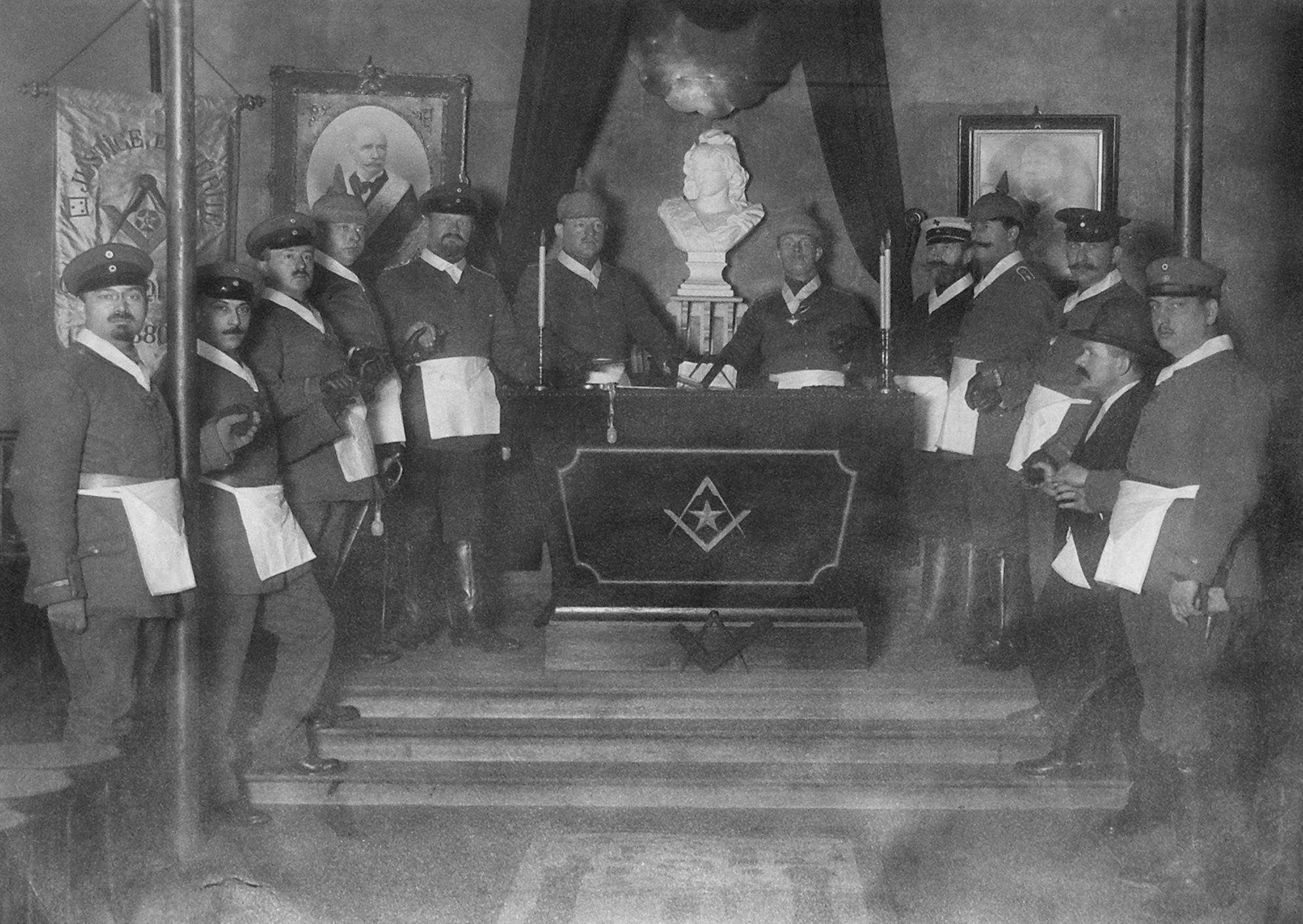
German soldiers lodge in a French temple and in front of Paul Lecreux's bust of the Masonic Marianne in Saint-Quentin, occupied between 1914 and 1918.

== European masonic powers before the war ==
At the beginning of the 20th century, Freemasonry experienced global expansion in alignment with the economic and colonial development of primarily European powers. The International Office of Masonic Relations documented the existence of nearly 24,000 lodges across the globe, comprising a membership of over two million Freemasons. Nevertheless, the United States had been the preeminent Masonic power since the 19th century, with its growth structured through affiliation and division (the Mothering Process). This model was inspired by the British model but adapted to align with American culture. The American Freemasonry membership comprised 1,500,000 white members and 30,000 Black members, who were largely excluded from the organization due to racial discrimination. Nevertheless, the country's isolationism and philanthropic approach focused on America did not facilitate its international influence. The British Empire constituted the second-largest Masonic space, with a membership of nearly 490,000 and 6,000 lodges. In 1913, the Anglo-American bloc accounted for four-fifths of the world's Freemasons. Continental Europe constituted the third-largest Masonic space, with 160,000 members, while Latin America had between 55,000 and 60,000 members. At the beginning of the 20th century, despite significant differences, the three major European Masonic obediences continued the evolution that had begun in the 19th century, becoming more or less nationalized.

=== United Kingdom ===
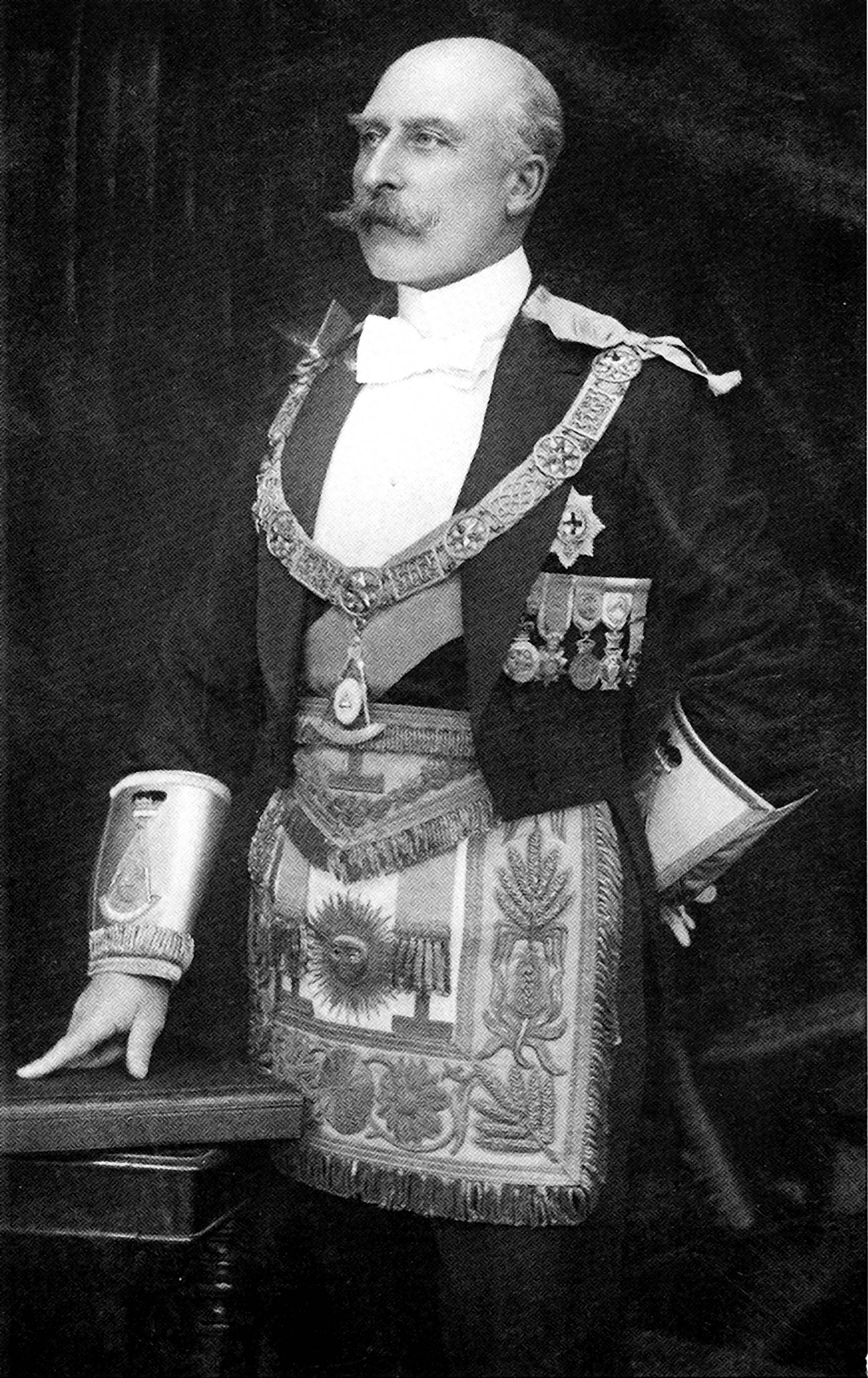
Duke Arthur of Connaught in grand master's regalia.

In 1914, the United Kingdom played a pivotal role in the global economy and Freemasonry. It is estimated that 99% of Freemasons belonged to one of the three "historic" obedience. The United Grand Lodge of England, regarded as the "Mother Lodge of the World", had between 270,000 and 290,000 members. The Grand Master since 1901 was Duke Arthur of Connaught and Strathearn, son of Queen Victoria. A significant proportion of the kingdom's elite were members, including Winston Churchill. (Note: He was initiated as a Freemason on May 24, 1901, in Studhilme Lodge No. 1521 in London, raised to Master on March 5, 1902.) The English obedience comprised 1,700 lodges on the mainland and over 700 in territories and colonies of the British Empire. Its sociological recruitment and alignment with the Conservative Party and the Anglican Church contributed to its strong presence in London, the Midlands, and southern England.

Scotland, concurrently, exhibited the highest density of Freemasons globally, with nearly one in thirty adult males belonging to an obedience, comprising approximately 50,000 members, the vast majority of whom were part of the Grand Lodge of Scotland. As with the English obedience, a significant proportion of its leadership originated from the nobility. However, it differed in its more religious expression and spiritual tolerance. The lodges it established in territories with more inclusive social structures allowed for the admission of non-white communities or members of other religions besides Christianity. The recruitment process was less elitist, comprising artisans, small business owners, or professionals who formed mutualist networks and affirmed a Scottish identity.

Ireland was the subject of considerable hostility from both Catholics and radical nationalists. However, the Grand Lodge of Ireland had a membership of between 30,000 and 50,000, most of whom were from the province of Ulster. In 1913, the Grand Lodge was led by Richard Hely-Hutchison, Earl of Donoughmore, and its membership was predominantly Protestant or Anglo-Irish.

The establishment of female and mixed-gender Freemasonry is generally considered to have commenced in 1906 with the creation of the Human Duty lodge in London by Annie Besant. This was followed by the establishment of a further fourteen mixed lodges up to 1914.

The United Grand Lodge of England, which defines its role as Mother Lodge of the World", initially sought to consolidate relations between the three historic obediences. In 1904, John W. Woodall, a former dignitary of the English obedience, established an organization to promote peace through Freemasonry. The International Masonic Club was established to facilitate encounters between Freemasons of diverse nationalities, with London serving as a hub for over 51,000 European nationals, predominantly Germans, French, and Italians, representing a range of social and professional backgrounds.

=== Germany ===
In 1914, the German Empire was the most populous country in Europe, with a population of 69 million. It was also the leading industrial and military power. The country's dominant position was sustained by a protectionist economic policy, the export of high-quality goods, and robust domestic demand, which enabled significant productivity gains. In 1900, the country was Europe's second-largest Masonic power, although it was characterized by considerable fragmentation and high obedience. The Freemasonry under the German Empire was constituted by approximately ten obediences, divided into two principal groups. Two principal currents may be identified within the German Masonic tradition: a "Prussian" or "Christian" current, which may be characterized as conservative and nationalist, and a "humanitarian" current, which may be described as internationalist and liberal. The Prussian current constituted approximately three-quarters of Germany's Masonic membership and was divided into three major lodges: the "Große Landesloge", which was established in 1740, the "Große National-Mutterloge", and the "Große Loge." The humanitarian current, which assumed this designation in the early 20th century, was established in the 19th century and comprised five obediences: the Grand Lodge of Hamburg, the Grand Lodge of the Sun, the National Grand Lodge of Saxony, the Eclectic Union Grand Mother Lodge, and the Grand Mother Lodge of Concord. Notwithstanding their divergences, the eight principal German lodges acknowledged each other as regular. In 1872, the various German Grand Lodges formed the Alliance of German Grand Lodges, which by 1920 had a membership of 20,000. In 1907, a ninth obedience, the Alliance Maçonnique du Soleil, was created with a focus on pacifism and internationalism. This new obedience had a few hundred members in 1914 but was later ostracized by all other obediences.

=== France ===
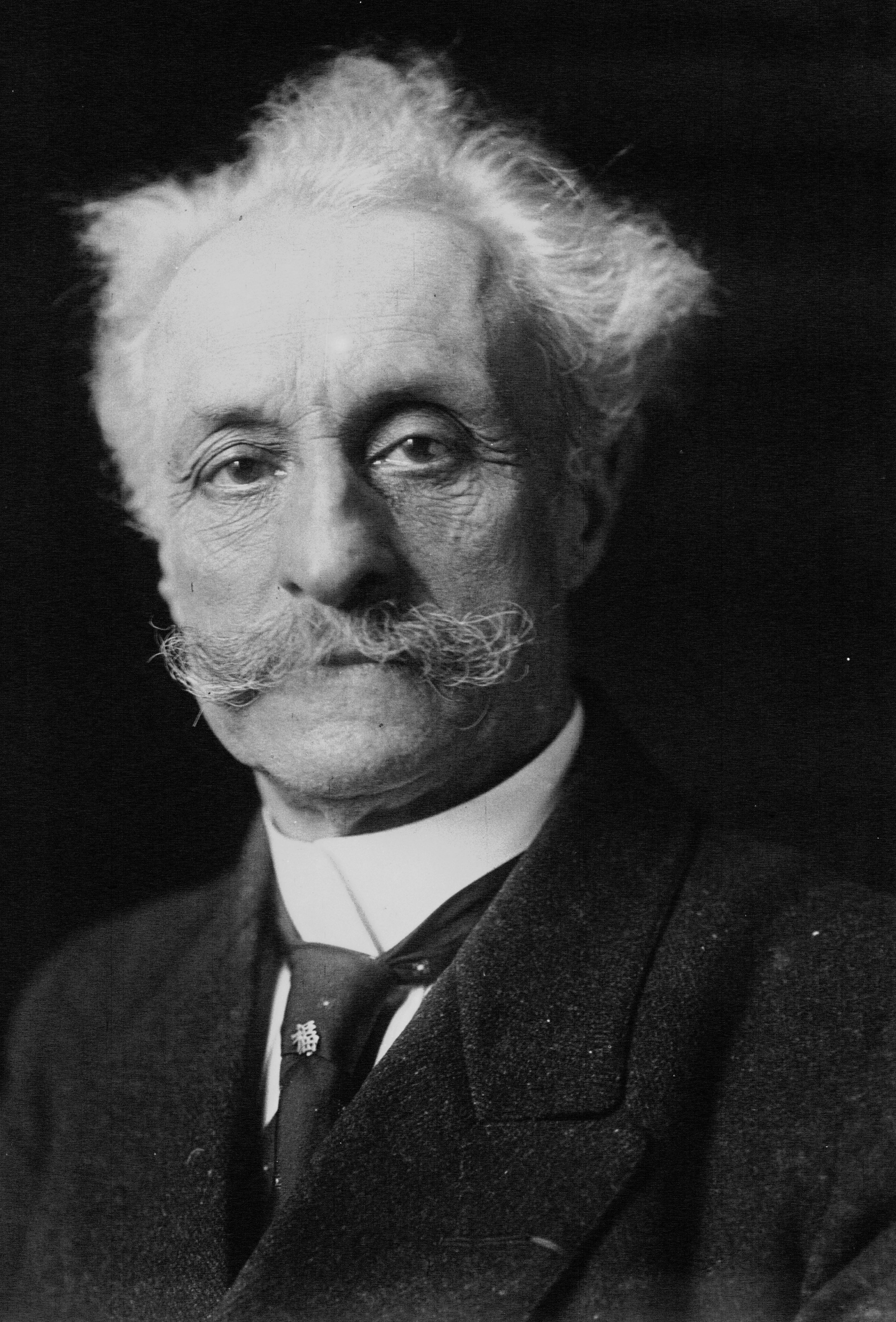
Charles Debierre in 1921.

In 1913, the Grand Orient de France (GODF) comprised 30,700 members, distributed across 432 lodges. The obedience was presided over by Charles Debierre, a senator representing the Nord region. The convocation of the Convent, held in September 1913, called for amendments to the law enacted in August, which extended military service to three years. This legislation was regarded as antithetical to the tenets of universal fraternity espoused by Freemasonry and was perceived to exacerbate the "blood tax" imposed on the populace. In late September, the Grand Lodge of France, under the Grand Master of the Order, Gustave Mesureur, held its Convent in new premises on Rue Puteaux in Paris. At the beginning of the century, the obedience was aligned with the ideology of the Grand Orient of France (GODF), debating issues such as the high cost of living, free school supplies, and the fight against alcoholism.

Additionally, the French Masonic landscape encompassed the International Mixed Masonic Order, Le Droit Humain, which, in 1914, oversaw the operations of 21 lodges and comprised approximately 1,000 members. It also included the Symbolic Grand Lodge of France, which had recently separated from Le Droit Humain, the Scottish Symbolic Grand Lodge, and a few smaller organizations representing Egyptian currents, such as Memphis-Misraïm, Martinism, and the Swedenborg Rite. The Independent and Regular Grand Lodge, established in 1914, was promptly acknowledged by the United Grand Lodge of England by aligning itself with the deist current of Freemasonry. French obediences, in tune with the prevailing social mores, were divided between pacifism and patriotism. This dichotomy is exemplified by a motion presented at the GODF convent in 1911, where Jules Uhry advocated for the defense of the homeland in case of aggression and for seeking contacts to strengthen peace.

== Masonic internationalism and pacifism ==
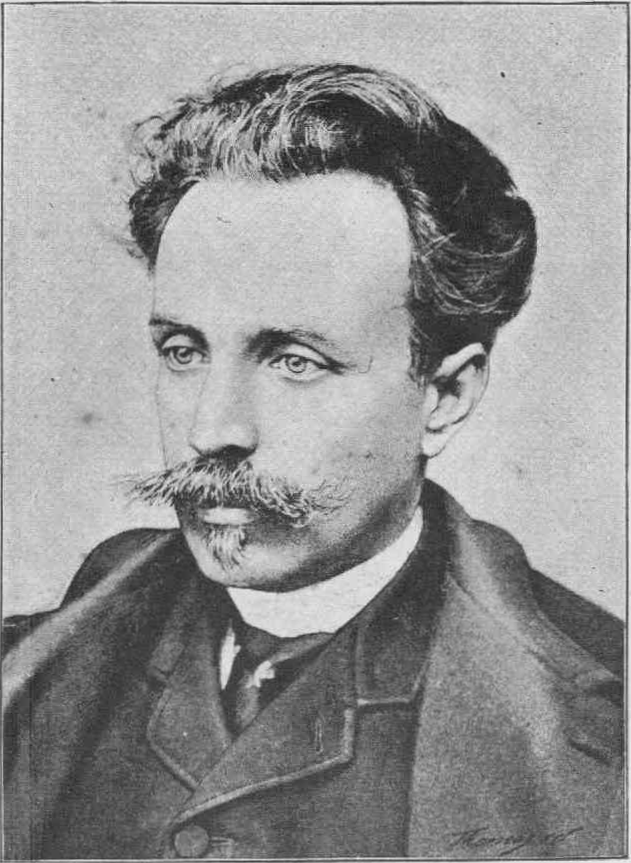
Sebastião de Magalhães Lima, Grand Master of the Lusitanian Grand Orient,1st President of the Universal League of Freemasons.

From 1840 onwards, relations between different obediences developed to create a global network, despite numerous language barriers. This process gathered pace between 1890 and 1900. Contacts proliferated at all levels, with obediences, lodges, and Freemasons formalizing numerous treaties of friendship or mutual recognition. However, relations were primarily conducted through Masonic channels. The traditional Anglo-Saxon current, which was predominantly deist and composed mainly of historical British and American obediences, and the Latin current, which was liberal and often anticlerical, with its primary composition being the major French, Italian, Spanish, and Belgian obediences, were the two major trends that Freemasonry gravitated towards. Additionally, a Freemasonry that emerged from the colonial empires in South America and Oceania also formed part of this network.

The culture of peace that has long been embedded in the heritage of European Freemasonry was a significant factor in the development of internationalism and pacifism within the movement during the second half of the nineteenth century. The inaugural initiative was undertaken during the inaugural World Esperanto Congress in Boulogne-sur-Mer in 1905, with the establishment of the Universal League of Freemasons. This organization was open to all individuals, irrespective of their liberal or traditional obediences. The internationalist project that was developing around Esperanto attracted a considerable number of Freemasons.

Although not entirely homogeneous, Masonic obediences in each country demonstrated a general proclivity to endorse international pacifist actions and associations. Many Freemasons had influential roles within these associations, with a number of them going on to win the Nobel Peace Prize. (Note: Élie Ducommun in 1902, Theodore Roosevelt in 1906, Ernesto Teodoro Moneta in 1907, Alfred Hermann Fried in 1911, and Henri La Fontaine in 1913. (Note: Hivert-Messeca 2016, p. 275)) The international Masonic relations network served as a conduit for promoting pacifist ideals until the advent of a nationalist backlash precipitated by the outbreak of hostilities. However, before the declaration of war, the definitive failure of this movement was due to the existence of significant contradictions and divisions that prevented an agreement between obediences, which conceived Freemasonry in ways that were sometimes markedly different. This failure can be considered comparable to that of the general pacifist movement between 1914 and 1915, with the concept of a "just war" eventually prevailing. This resulted in Masonic obediences and associations compelled to support their respective national armies and causes.

=== Bureau of international relations ===
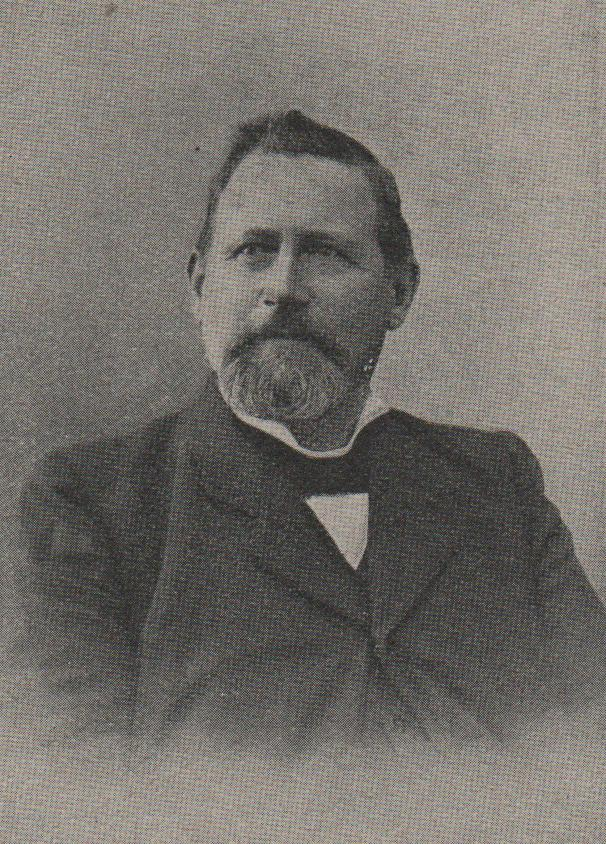
Édouard Quartier-la-Tente, Grand Master of the Swiss Grand Lodge Alpina.

Until 1914, British obediences maintained relations with their German counterparts, while distancing themselves from the French obediences, which they viewed as atheistic, politicized, and Anglophobic. Relations between the two Masonic nations had been at their lowest for several years, and the creation and recognition by England of the future Grande Loge Nationale Française did nothing to improve the situation.

Nevertheless, the concept of universal Freemasonry continued to be regarded as an active utopia by some Freemasons. Several so-called universal international congresses were convened, although their success was variable. Additionally, international meetings were held in Belgium and Luxembourg, though their success was limited. However, these efforts resulted in the establishment of a permanent office, which was supported by the Grande Loge Suisse Alpina. Alpina succeeded in convening twenty-two obediences and eight high-grade jurisdictions in Geneva, adopting the statutes of the International Bureau of Masonic Relations (BIRM), which was established in Neuchâtel on January 1, 1903, and presided over by Édouard Quartier-la-Tente. The office, with modest and apolitical objectives, sought to facilitate inter-obedient meetings. It published a bulletin and participated in peace congresses. However, by 1914, these meetings were largely ignored by Anglo-Saxon and German Freemasonry. The office made numerous efforts and demonstrated considerable diplomacy in its attempts to federate obediences from various currents, which at times regarded the initiative as superfluous or a potential loss of autonomy.

Although not explicitly articulated in the organization's founding documents, the tenets of pacifism were disseminated during Masonic assemblies. The most extensively discussed topics at the Geneva Congress were those about peace and international arbitration. At this juncture, a proposal was put forth to designate May 18, the date of the inaugural session of the Hague Conference, as a symbolic date on which each obedience would commemorate the ideal of peace and justice between nations. These same themes were discussed at the subsequent congress, held in Brussels, which brought together 23 predominantly liberal obediences. The participants emphasized the significance of international arbitration and proposed the implementation of propaganda in its favor. Other proposals aimed at promoting world peace were primarily put forth by Jean-Laurent Hasse, deputy grand master of the Grand Orient of Belgium.

=== Franco-German masonic rapprochement ===
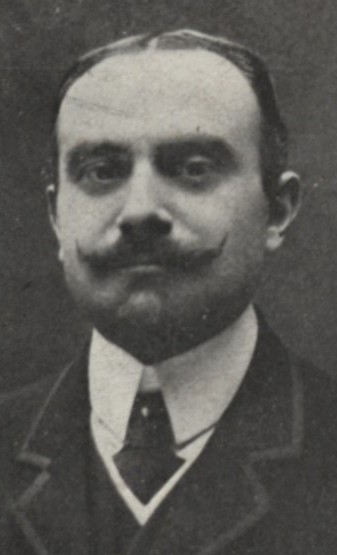
Lucien Le Foyer in 1909.

The outcome of the Franco-Prussian War of 1870 and the subsequent annexation of Alsace-Lorraine resulted in a significant deterioration in relations between the two countries, particularly within the context of Freemasonry. Despite calls from Swiss and Italian Freemasonry for a unified response, nationalist sentiments led to the dissolution of the "universal chain of union", which had been established to foster unity among Freemasons transcending their differences. Consequently, until 1900, no formal meetings were held between French and German lodges or obediences.

At the Brussels Congress in 1904, Lucien Le Foyer, a French delegate, directed the assembly's attention to the arms race in Europe, particularly. To this end, the congress participants considered it imperative to pursue Franco-German rapprochement, with Freemasonry expected to play a pivotal role in this endeavor. The congress unanimously designated this as a principal objective and charged the Grande Loge of Frankfurt with disseminating this initiative throughout other obediences. In September 1905, Heinrich Kraft, a lawyer based in Strasbourg, presented a report at the congress of the Verein Deutscher Freimaurer, an organization representing German Freemasonry. Kraft's report invited German Freemasonry to recognize the Grande Loge de France, which had been less criticized than the Grand Orient de France by those representing a 'traditional Prussian current'. This proposal was subsequently adopted by German obediences. In 1906, an informal inaugural meeting to promote world peace was held in Colmar, attended by 200 German Freemasons, 60 Swiss, and 120 French participants. To demonstrate the rapprochement, the Grande Loge opened a German-speaking lodge, named "Goethe", in Paris. The initiative was promptly denounced by the anti-Semitic press, which accused it of being a den of Austrian and Hungarian Jews. After this inaugural rapprochement, additional informal meetings were held. In July 1907, the inaugural official meeting between French and German Freemasonry was convened. It took place in the Vosges, at the Col de la Schlucht, on the Franco-German border. Nearly 400 Freemasons from several nationalities were in attendance, accompanied by journalists from both countries, who documented the sentiments and aspirations for peace and fraternity that emerged from the meeting.

Notwithstanding the prevailing mistrust of the French and Prussian obediences, many further meetings were convened, namely in Basel in July 1908 and Baden-Baden in July 1909. A meeting scheduled for July 1910 was ultimately held in July 1911 in Paris, where the Grand Orient de France maintained a distance, as the Agadir Crisis nearly precipitated a conflict with Germany. Subsequent meetings were conducted outside France, in Luxembourg in 1912 and The Hague in 1913 under the auspices of the Grand Orient of the Netherlands, with obediences from fourteen different countries in attendance.

However, the intensification of political discord and the proliferation of crises between prospective combatants further undermined this rapprochement process. The subsequent meeting, scheduled for August 16, 1914, in Frankfurt, was canceled as the commencement of hostilities effectively terminated the aspirations of European Freemasonry for peace. French Freemasonry once again severed all ties with German obediences and German-speaking lodges were closed.

== Armed conflict ==
From the outset of the conflict, the majority of Masonic obediences and lodges in the warring nations aligned themselves with the decisions of their respective governments. The onset of the conflict effectively eroded pacifist principles, marginalizing them or even rendering them illegal, silencing numerous activists. However, there were exceptions, including the voices of Frenchman Romain Rolland, Briton Bertrand Russell, and a few minority groups of socialists or anarchists who advocated for total pacifism. (Note: Hivert-Messeca 2016, p. 225)

The anti-Masonry of that period immediately depicted Freemasonry as an agent of war, a perspective that would have ramifications for the actions of Freemasons in the 1920s and 1930s. Depending on their influence in society, national Freemasonries either followed or amplified the choices of their respective states. Freemasons, for their part, adhered to the patriotic values of their countries. The speeches and work within the lodges contributed to theorizing the concept of a "just war". (Note: Hivert-Messeca 2016, p. 121)

Freemasonry has demonstrated its capacity for adaptation, regardless of the commitments it faces. The values of universal brotherhood and cosmopolitanism, previously undermined by the carnage of battles like the Marne or Verdun and the nationalism that emerged in their wake, have been revised and are now employed in a rhetoric that justifies sacrifices. (Note: Hivert-Messeca 2016, p. 171) This rhetoric posits that each side is defending the right to freedom, with defending the homeland equating to defending the good of all humanity. Ultimately, this rhetoric gives rise to the idea of "a better world from the ruins of the past", often invoked in the post-conflict discourse.

=== European engagement ===
==== France ====
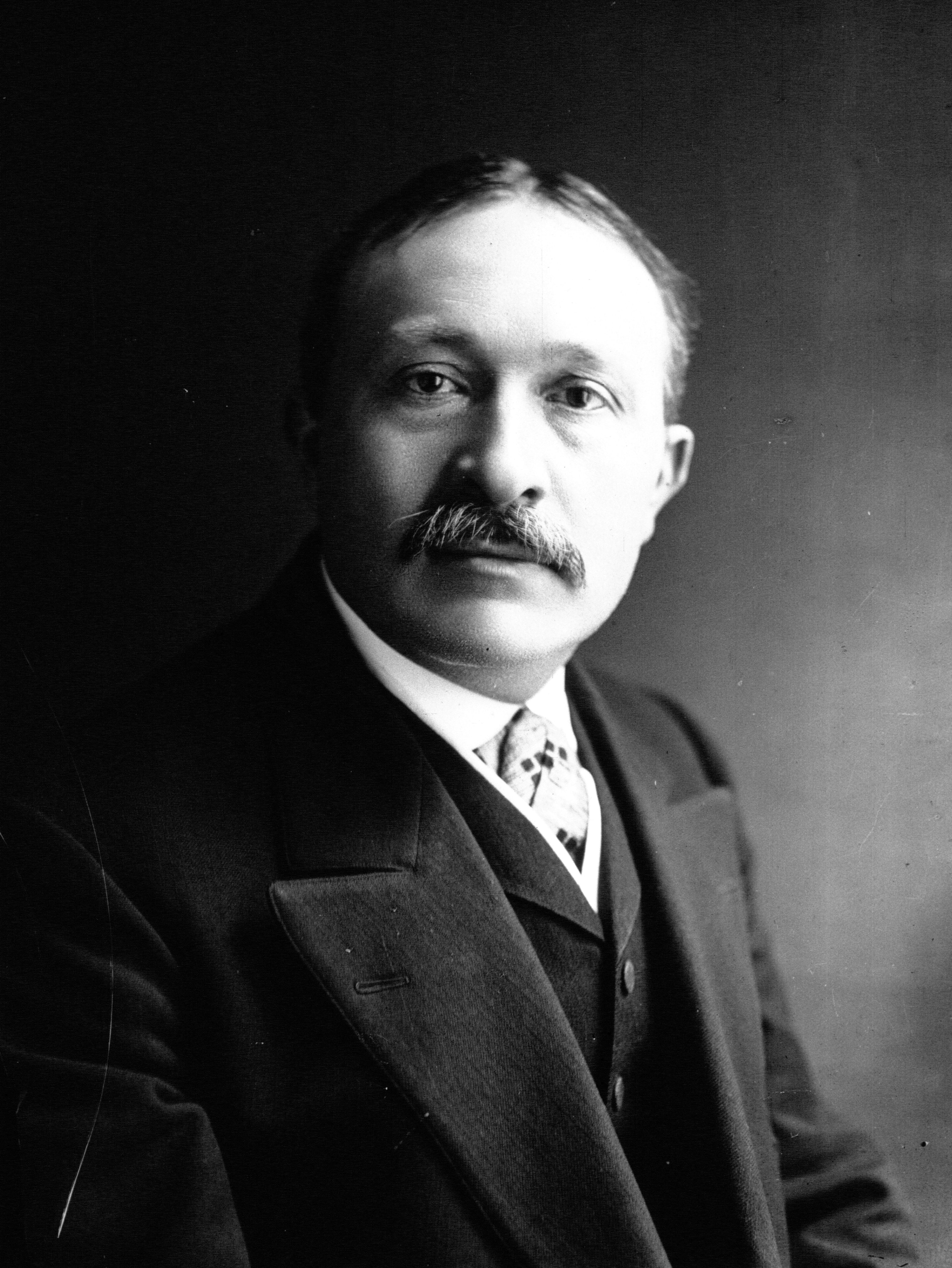
René Viviani in 1912.

In France, a small number of Freemasons attempted to maintain peace until the end of the conflict. These included Charles Beauquier, a freethinker and radical deputy from Doubs, Léon Bourgeois, and Lucien Le Foyer. The cabinet formed by René Viviani on June 13, 1914, in which he had been initiated as a Freemason in 1894 in the lodge "Droit et Justice", included several Freemasons. The mobilization of French Freemasons is characterized by a patriotism driven by the certainty of participating in the sacred defense of France and the Republic. At its session on December 13, 1914, the Grand Orient of France denounced the belligerence of the Austro-Hungarian Empire and the atrocities committed by the German army. French Freemasons were firmly convinced that they were aligned with the values of civilization in opposition to the perceived barbarism of the Austro-Hungarian Empire. From 1916 to 1918, lodge activities reflected the developments of the war. Discussions encompassed a range of topics, including military and political matters, such as the status of the army and the role of the high command, as presented by Masonic deputies. Social issues, such as rent and the rising cost of living, were also addressed by the anarchist Sébastien Faure. (Note: He resigned from the GODF in December 1917, disappointed by the nationalist trend that had become dominant in the obedience.) Additionally, discussions delved into more contentious topics, including the search for responsibility and the causes of the war.

==== Germany ====
In Germany, the "theory of inevitable war" was firmly established within conservative and military circles and subsequently disseminated to the middle classes and, to a certain extent, the working classes. Those lodges oriented towards Prussia were anticipating conflict, whereas those aligned with the humanitarian current were ambivalent, oscillating between aspirations for peace and nationalism. At the outbreak of war, the majority of German Freemasons were prepared to unite in a sacred alliance (Burgfrieden), viewing the conflict as a defensive measure in response to Russian and Western Allied aggression. Consequently, German obediences immediately severed relations with Freemasonries in enemy states. They maintained relations with American Freemasonry until 1917 when the United States entered the war on the side of the Allies.

==== Austria-Hungary ====
The position of Freemasonry in Austria-Hungary was distinctive and complex. Despite being banned in Austria, Freemasonry was tolerated through the establishment of paramasonic clubs, as attempts to legalize it had failed. The upper echelons of society, namely the elites and aristocracy, were conspicuous by their absence from the lodges, which nevertheless formed along the Hungarian border. However, Freemasonry was legal and active in Transleithania. The main obedience, the Symbolic Grand Lodge of Hungary, had approximately 100 lodges and 6,000 members in 1914. It exhibited moderate and liberal tendencies and was largely loyal to the dynasty. When the conflict broke out, it largely aligned with the policies of the Dual Monarchy.

==== United Kingdom ====
The United Kingdom declared war in August 1914. By August 29, The Freemason magazine had issued a call to arms: Le Roi et le pays ont besoin de vous. Appel aux armes (The King and the country need you. Call to arms). However, the conflict only partially altered interobedient relations, as British obediences proceeded to sever ties with obediences in enemy countries. In 1915, a resolution was adopted concerning members born on German soil, to exclude them, even if they had been naturalized. Furthermore, the war also slowed the creation of new lodges: from 70 creations between 1910 and 1913, only 20 to 30 were created annually from 1914 to 1917.

==== Other European countries ====
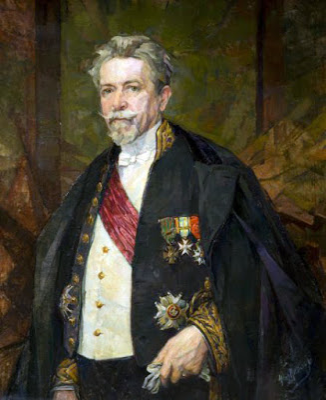
Charles Magnette.

In addition to the major European powers, other nations also became involved in the conflict.

Belgium was compelled to take action against its will as a result of the German Empire's violation of its neutrality through the invasion of its territory. The German army was accused of perpetrating a series of atrocities. In September 1914, Charles Magnette, the newly appointed Grand Master of the Grand Orient of Belgium and a Liberal Senator, wrote to all German Masonic obediences to protest and remind them that, while Freemasons owe allegiance to their homeland, there is no justification for abandoning transnational humanist values. He proposed the establishment of a commission to investigate these atrocities and the signing of a humanitarian agreement between the warring parties. Only two German obediences responded, expressing their full confidence in their army.

In Russia, at the onset of the conflict, Freemasonry was present among the ruling class and intellectuals. It had approximately one thousand members in fifty lodges, yet was absent from the peasantry and working classes. Upon the declaration of war, it adopted a stance characterized by Germanophobia and patriotism.

Bulgaria, which joined the Central Powers and entered the war on their side, had a relatively weak Masonic presence, with the establishment of new lodges being mainly driven by French, Italian, and Romanian obediences.

Italy initially declared neutrality but subsequently signed the Treaty of London on April 26, 1915, thereby joining the Allied forces of the Triple Entente and declaring war on Austria-Hungary in May 1915. In the period preceding the outbreak of hostilities, Italian Freemasonry was experiencing a period of decline, following a period of prosperity in the 1880s and 1900s. Freemasons were regarded as bourgeois by socialists, internationalist by nationalists, and anti-religious by the clergy. Nevertheless, they remained a prominent presence in parliamentary chambers, with numerous elected members. In 1912, there were almost 90 Freemasons distributed across all political parties, with the majority belonging to the Republican and Progressive parties. At the outbreak of the conflict in 1914, Italian Freemasonry still had over 27,000 members, divided between those in favor of intervention and those in favor of neutrality. The minority of neutralists adhered to the pacifist and internationalist ideals that had emerged in the early 1900s, whereas the majority of interventionists, driven by irredentist sentiments, campaigned for Italy's entry into the war against the Central Powers. Turkey's entry into the war alongside the Central Powers prompted Italy to declare war on Austria-Hungary and, a few days later, on Germany. Italian Freemasonry's intervention influenced the country's decision to enter the war on the side of the Allies.

In 1916, Portugal became a member of the Triple Entente. Portuguese Freemasonry, which was highly politicized at the time, followed the developments of the First Portuguese Republic. With approximately 4,000 members distributed across 170 lodges, Portuguese Freemasonry was able to amass a significant portion of the political and intellectual elite that supported the republican movement. During the presidency of Bernardino Machado, the former Grand Master of the Unified Lusitanian Grand Orient, the country entered the war after signing agreements with the Allied forces. Portuguese Freemasonry supported this war effort, with almost all Freemasons sharing this commitment. This support was aligned with the various republican currents that were in favor of these decisions, which were designed to consolidate the young republican regime and defend the colonies against German threats.

Following negotiations with both camps, Romania joined the Triple Entente in 1916. However, the role of Romanian Freemasonry was minimal, as it was embroiled in internal disputes and divisions that were often exploited by the French, German, and Italian obediences, which established lodges under their auspices. This multiplicity of opinions explains why Romanian Freemasons had little influence on the country's political decisions.

==== Neutral countries ====
Many countries, including Switzerland, Spain, the Netherlands, and those in Scandinavia, declared themselves neutral and remained so throughout the war. (Note: Hivert-Messeca 2016, p. 151)

The considerable popularity of Scandinavian Freemasonry at the beginning of the 20th century was attributable to a combination of factors, including its autarkic nature and its history. Primarily practicing the Christian-leaning Swedish Rite, the order was focused on philanthropy and largely uninterested in international affairs. (Note: Hivert-Messeca 2016, p. 152) The homogeneity of Nordic Freemasonry in its form was a factor that, while not alienating it from the various currents of civil society, contributed to the neutrality these countries maintained until the conclusion of the conflict. (Note: Hivert-Messeca 2016, p. 157)

The geographical and political situation of the Netherlands encouraged the maintenance of a neutral position, though the country still mobilized its army in anticipation of a German attack, which did not occur. (Note: Hivert-Messeca 2016, p. 158) Dutch Freemasonry, among the oldest in Europe, was well-established and institutionalized due to the protection received from the royal family, the lack of anti-Masonry, and its non-involvement in the country's political affairs. (Note: Hivert-Messeca 2016, p. 159) From 1914 to 1918, it approved of the country's policies, stayed in line with national sentiment, maintained contacts with both English and German Freemasonries, and did not prohibit relations with liberal obediences. (Note: Hivert-Messeca 2016, p. 161)

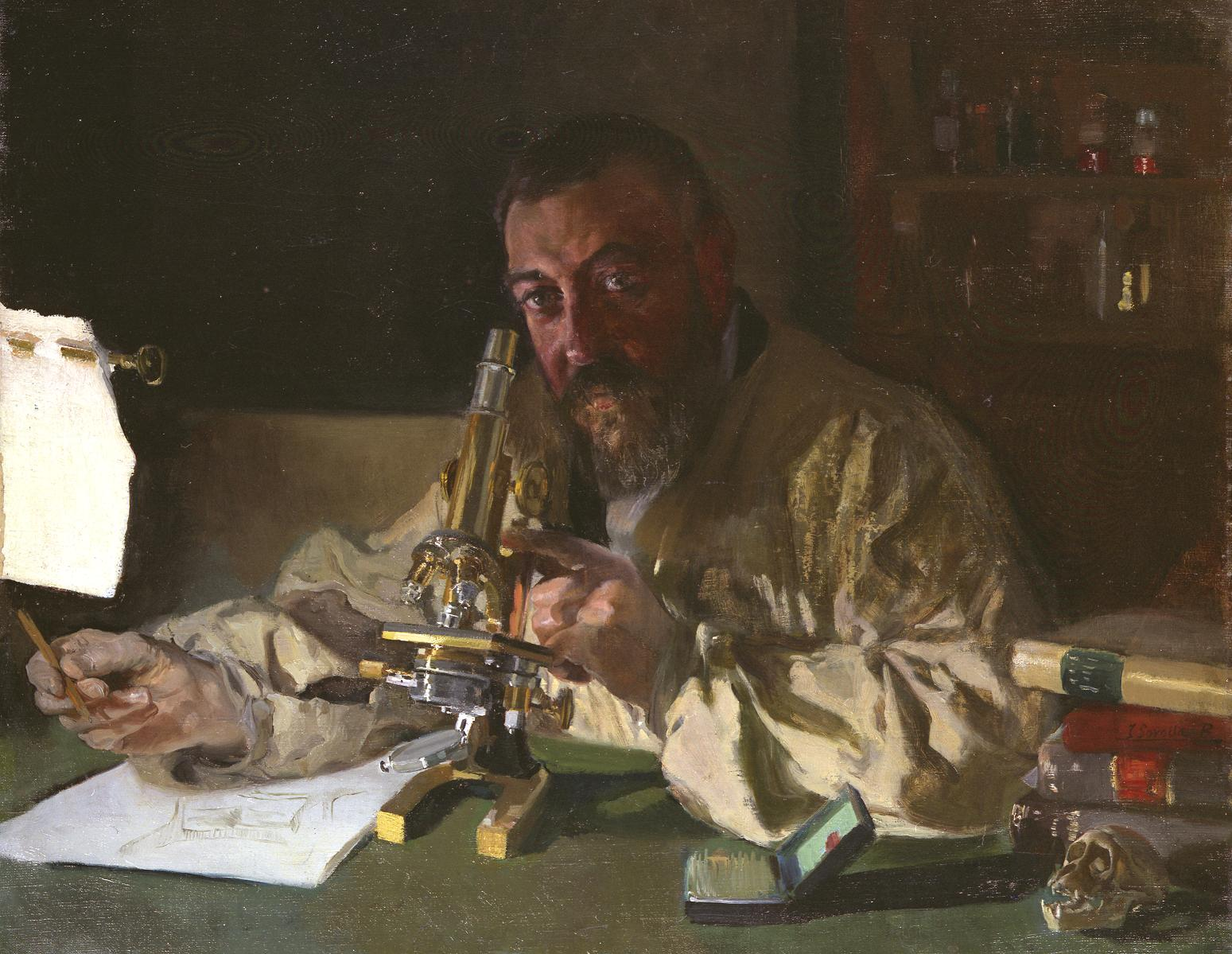
Luis Simarro Lacabra, Grand Master of the Spanish Grand Orient.

In August 1914, the government of Eduardo Dato Iradier published a royal decree proclaiming Spain's "strict neutrality." This was because Spain found no interest in supporting either side, given its internal political situation. Despite the proclamation of strict neutrality by the Spanish government, various political figures were observed to be supporting one side or the other through the "Germanophile" and "Alliedophile" movements, which were aligned with the Central Powers (led by the Germans) and the Allies, respectively. (Note: Hivert-Messeca 2016, p. 163) Spanish Freemasonry, which reached its zenith in the nineteenth century, was notably absent from the upper echelons of society. Those with anti-Masonic leanings accused it of anti-patriotism and of supporting the independence of Spain's last Pacific colonies. As a result, it was associated with the general decline of Spain. (Note: Hivert-Messeca 2016, p. 165) Its recruitment was focused on the middle class and small businesses, and it experienced a resurgence of dynamism around 1906. The Grand Orient of Spain, a recognized power within Freemasonry, engaged in extensive discourse on political matters within its lodges. (Note: Hivert-Messeca 2016, p. 166) Despite its diminished influence, it retained a degree of influence within the radical republican movement, comprising alliedophiles and neutralists. From 1916 onwards, under the leadership of Luis Simarro Lacabra, it fostered closer ties with French Freemasonry and demonstrated greater support for the Allied bloc. (Note: Hivert-Messeca 2016, p. 167)

At the outset of the conflict, Switzerland deployed its military forces in a bid to safeguard its status as an internationally recognized neutral state. The Swiss Freemasonry continues to demonstrate its support for the pacifist and humanist movement. With the assistance of a few Dutch and Spanish Freemasons, it maintains the International Bureau in a state of activity, with Édouard Quartier-la-Tente serving as the primary driving force. He maintains the bureau's neutrality to the greatest extent possible. Beginning in 1914, the bureau's primary focus shifted to assisting Freemason prisoners, searching for missing Freemasons caught up in the conflict, and sending packages. (Note: Hivert-Messeca 2016, p. 170)

=== Global involvement ===
==== Ottoman Empire ====
In October 1914, the Ottoman Empire became a member of the Central Powers. The Young Turks, who were admirers of the secular laws that had been passed in France towards the end of the 19th century, joined Freemasonry in large numbers through the French, Italian, and Spanish lodges that were present in Salonika. They endeavor to secure the support of the Grand Orient of France in their political endeavors. In 1908, to ensure the stability of his rule, Abdülhamid II reintroduced the 1876 constitution and called for legislative elections. Three Freemason generals were appointed to lead the new constitutional government, (Note: Enver Pasha, Minister of War; Talaat Pasha, Minister of the Interior; Djemal Pasha, Minister of the Navy.) while other Freemasons were given important portfolios. In this context of national pride, the first national obedience, the Ottoman Grand Orient, was established in 1909. The new obedience establishes lodges in numerous cities across the Empire and incorporates some foreign lodges, primarily those with a liberal orientation. English and Scottish lodges in Turkey remain either hostile or indifferent to the new national obedience, due to its close affiliation with liberal obediences and the geopolitical interests of their sponsoring nations.

Subsequently, the nascent Young Turk regime sought to use the apparatus of Turkish Freemasonry to cultivate enhanced relations with European powers. The lodges operate in a manner akin to political societies, rapidly distancing themselves from the tenets and principles espoused by Freemasonry. The political instrumentalization of Freemasonry in the Ottoman Empire resulted in the organization becoming a tool for advancing the new state, which exhibited increasing authoritarian tendencies. The interests of the Ottoman Empire, including pan-Turkism and the modernization of the country, and the Masonic affiliation of the country's elites, shaped the decisions of its leaders. The significant anti-Masonic sentiment that emerged until the defeat and fall of the ruling triumvirate in 1918 was a consequence of these factors.

==== North America ====
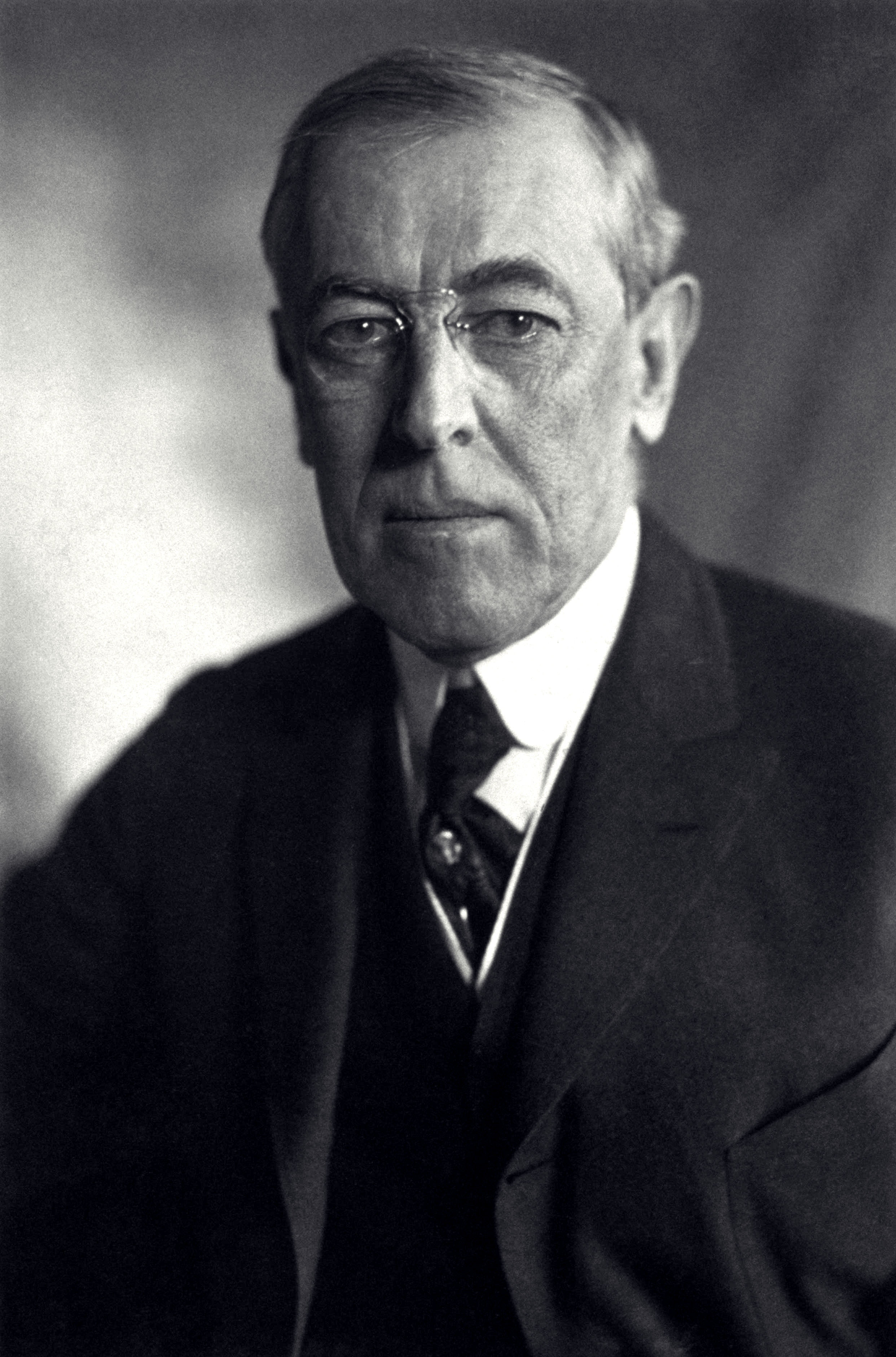
Woodrow Wilson in 1919.

On April 6, 1917, the United States became involved in the First World War, initially supporting the British against Germany and subsequently against Austria-Hungary. Freemasonry has a longstanding and pervasive presence in North American society. Although Freemasonry presents itself as apolitical, in accordance with the traditions of the Anglo-Saxon world, many Freemasons engage in political and social activities discreetly or overtly. (Note: Hivert-Messeca 2016, p. 106) At the suggestion of the Treasury Secretary, Democrat William Gibbs McAdoo, the 49 American obediences formed an association to enhance their efficacy in their relations with the War Department, which had previously declined to engage in discourse with multiple organizations. The Grand Masters convened in Cedar Rapids, Iowa, to establish the Masonic Service Association, whose principal objective was to support the war effort and military personnel. The use of the German language in the lodges of several states was promptly prohibited. (Note: Hivert-Messeca 2016, p. 107) American lodges, which seldom recruited members from pacifist, unionist, or socialist circles that were generally opposed to war, were primarily composed of White Anglo-Saxon Protestants. This demographic profile explains why one in ten American Freemasons participated in the fighting in Europe. (Note: Hivert-Messeca 2016, p. 108)

French Freemasonry welcomes the entry of the United States into the war, as President Woodrow Wilson possesses the dual qualities of being both a Democrat and a Freemason. Upon the arrival of American troops, the U.S. brothers are invited into French lodges, which facilitate the establishment of recognition links between the French and American obediences.

==== Latin America ====
Subsequently, other countries, including Cuba and Panama, have followed suit, though without the deployment of armed forces into the conflict. On October 26, 1917, Brazil became the only Latin American country to engage in military action during the war. Its contribution was modest but active, involving the deployment of several warships and airplane pilots to Europe. In 1917, Brazil had the highest Masonic density in Latin America, and Freemasons were prominent in political action. Brazilian obediences, largely influenced by the European liberal current, saw numerous political and military leaders occupying prominent roles within Masonic orders. To illustrate, Nilo Procópio Peçanha, senator and governor of Rio de Janeiro, Grand Master of the Grand Orient of Brazil, who assumed responsibility for foreign affairs in 1917, pursued a policy of Germanophobia. (Note: Hivert-Messeca 2016, p. 112) In early 1918, Guatemala, Nicaragua, Costa Rica, Haiti, and Honduras declared war alongside the Allies. However, Mexico, where the revolution was taking place from 1910 to 1920, during World War I, (Note: Hivert-Messeca 2016, p. 141) chose a policy of circumstantial neutrality. The disintegration of Mexican Freemasonry was largely exacerbated by the country's institutional divisions. (Note: Hivert-Messeca 2016, p. 144)

In general, Freemasonry in Latin America has remained primarily legalistic and legitimist, providing support for the geopolitical stances of their respective nations. (Note: Hivert-Messeca 2016, p. 137)

=== Prisoner lodges ===
It is estimated that between seven and nine million military prisoners and a few thousand civilians from both warring sides were detained during the conflict, with some individuals remaining incarcerated beyond the cessation of hostilities. The prolonged periods of imprisonment led to the emergence of various activities, particularly cultural pursuits, within detention camps. These activities were designed to combat the psychological effects of captivity, commonly referred to as the "barbed wire disease." (Note: Characterized depression. (Note: Hivert-Messeca 2016, p. 207)) Some prisoner Masonic lodges were established, though their duration was often limited, and they were predominantly Anglo-Saxon, in camps where the detention conditions were less harsh. (Note: Hivert-Messeca 2016, p. 207, 2019)

In France, the internment camp at Île Longue in the Brest harbor was operational from 1914 to 1919 and accommodated nearly 5,000 military and civilian prisoners, including Germans, Austrians, and Ottomans. A small number of imprisoned Freemasons were able to recognize one another and maintain fraternal relations. They proceeded to found a lodge, In Ketten zum Licht (Chained to the Light), in January 1918. (Note: Hivert-Messeca 2016, p. 208) The lodge organized four Masonic meetings and presented some work before suspending its activity in June 1918, following the announcement of the prisoners' repatriation to their countries. This lodge was the only one known in the Central Powers, composed solely of civilians, and had no relations with German obediences during its activity. (Note: Hivert-Messeca 2016, p. 208)

In other European countries, lodges established by Dutch Freemasonry were composed exclusively of military personnel and civilian auxiliaries from British and American armies. These individuals were prisoners in the Netherlands under the 1907 Hague Convention. One of the largest was established by Commodore Wilfred Henderson at the Groningen camp. The lodge was named Hospitality No. 113 and its consecration took place on May 22, 1915, according to the ModernFrench Rite and under the auspices of the Grand Orient of the Netherlands (GON). Its creation was authorized at the request of the United Grand Lodge of England (G70) by the GON, which had been approached for this purpose. (Note: Hivert-Messeca 2016, p. 218) Throughout its three-and-a-half-year existence, the lodge held 55 meetings and initiated 64 members. On November 11, 1916, a chapter was established to confer four postgraduate degrees. The final meeting of Hospitality No.113 took place on November 5, 1918. Additionally, the lodge facilitated the establishment of a second workshop within the camp, designated as Willem von Oranie Lodge. Primarily comprising inmates transferred from Germany, this workshop commenced its operations on July 16, 1918. After the conclusion of hostilities, the two workshops were incorporated into the United Grand Lodge of England in 1919, with the approval of the GON. (Note: Hivert-Messeca 2016, p. 219)

=== End of the conflict ===
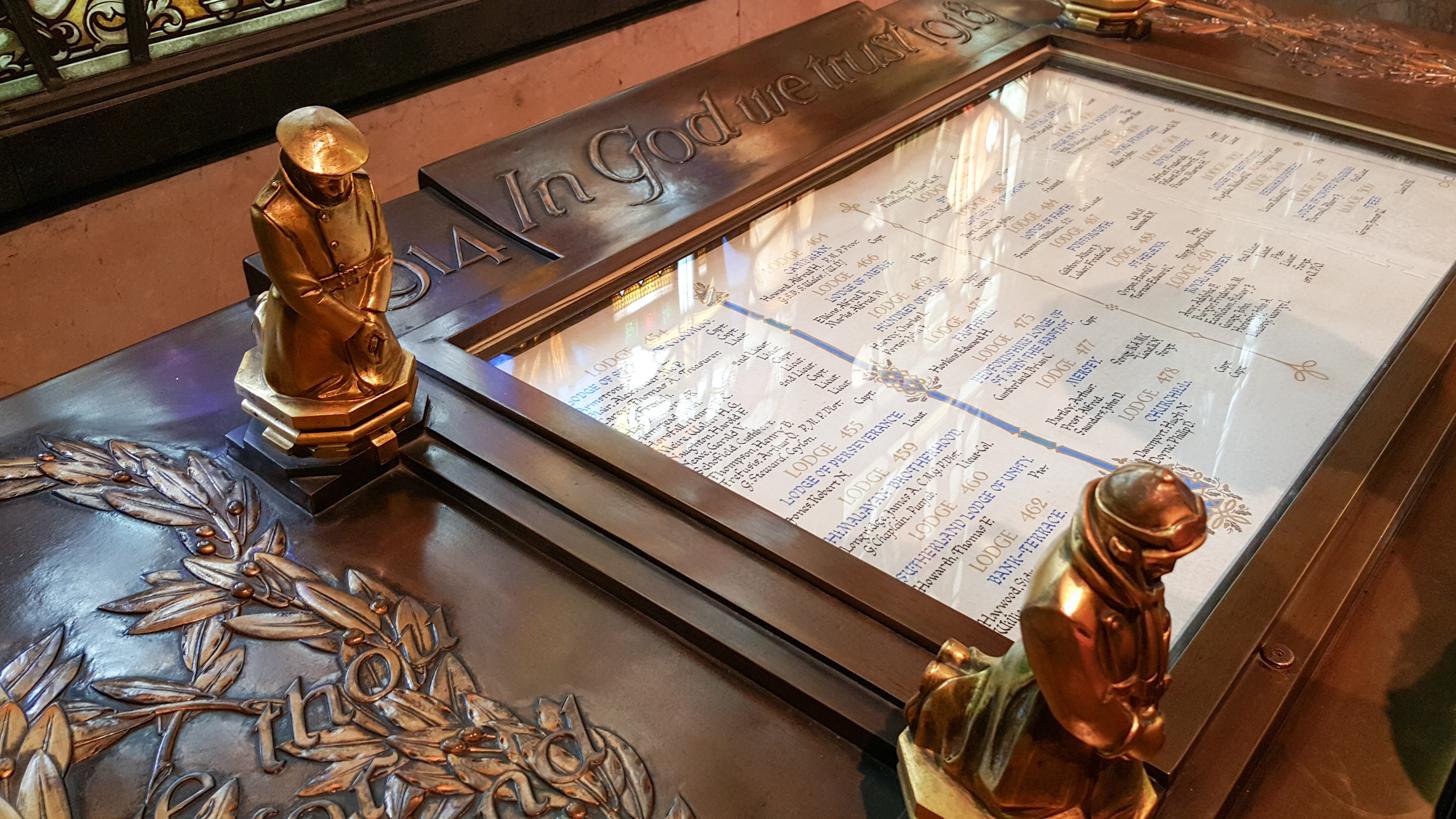
Tableau d'honneur, Freemasons' Hall, Londres.

In January 1917, a conference of Freemasons from Allied Nations was convened in Paris. The conference was spearheaded by Parisian lodges of the Grand Orient of France and the Grande Loge de France. Over 1,500 Freemasons were in attendance, including Grand Masters from Portugal, Italy, and delegations from Belgium and Serbia. The conference resulted in formulating a manifesto addressed to Freemasons from neutral countries. This document asserted that the victory of the Allies would be that of pacifism, as well as the triumph of the Masonic ideal. It further outlined the goal of constructing a free Europe and a free world. Following the United States' entry into the war, a new congress was held from June 28 to 30, bringing together delegations from the United States, Argentina, Brazil, Italy, Spain, Serbia, Belgium, Switzerland, and Portugal. The congress addressed the establishment of a genuine League of Nations, emphasizing the necessity of permanent international consultation for preserving peace. The assembled members solemnly proclaimed that this developing organization, a guarantor of peace and respect for international law, represented the new "worksite of universal brotherhood." However, the German Empire was excluded on the premise that only a "liberated and regenerated Germany" could be part of this society.

The conclusion of the conflict and the November 1918 armistice swiftly illuminated the extent of the human toll, which reached millions after the belligerent nations had mobilized approximately 73 million men of military age. (Note: Hivert-Messeca 2016, p. 293)

The number of Freemasons mobilized and fallen in combat is primarily documented through monuments and various commemorations erected or maintained by obediences in the years following the conflict. The book Memorials of Masonians who Fell in the Great War, located at the Peace Memorial of Freemasons' Hall in London, lists 3,453 Freemasons who perished in combat, representing 5% of the English Masonic membership at the time. A total of 91 of these individuals were awarded the Victoria Cross. (Note: Hivert-Messeca 2016, p. 240) A review of monographs from French Masonic lodges indicates that one in seven French Freemasons perished on the battlefield. Similarly, the losses among German, Italian, and British Freemasons were of a comparable magnitude, representing approximately 3% of the European Masonic membership at the time. Although mobilized for a shorter period, American obediences reported a similar loss rate among their members. The Grand Lodge of Wisconsin, for instance, mentions in its archives that 3,665 of its members were mobilized from 1917 to 1919, with 94 killed in combat. (Note: Hivert-Messeca 2016, p. 241)

== Post-war ==
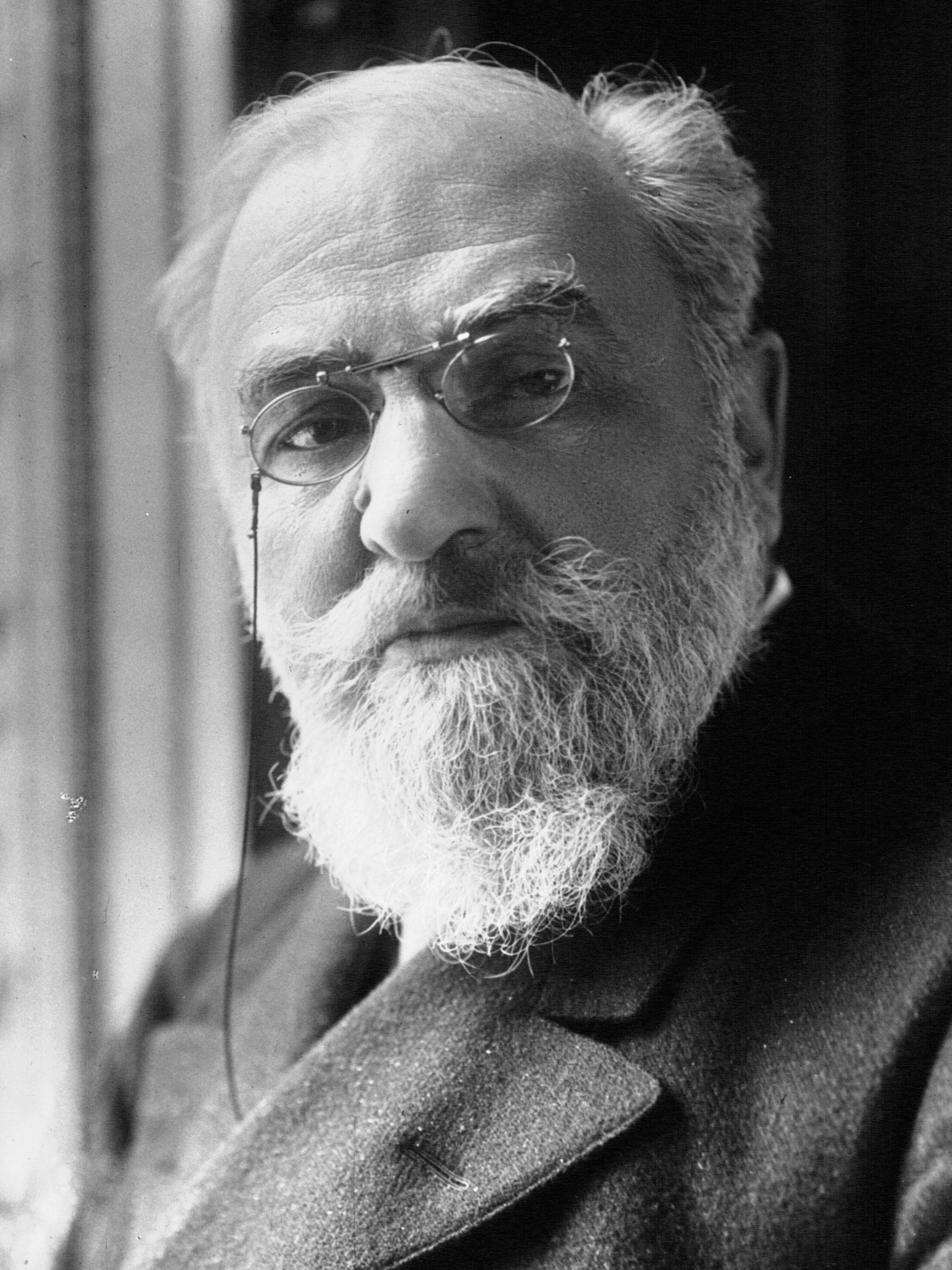
Léon Bourgeois in 1917.

Upon the conclusion of the conflict, the members of the lodges were predominantly erstwhile combatants, a proportion of whom had sustained injuries or disabilities. A coexistence emerged within the lodges between the poles of patriotism and pacifism, encompassing a spectrum of revanchism, from a thirst for vengeance to a desire for reconciliation. The national obediences, in stark contrast to the homogeneity that would have been expected, were constituted by a mosaic of groups, where commemorations of the war dead coexisted with expressions of solidarity for survivors and victims of all kinds. (Note: Hivert-Messeca 2016, p. 243)

Nevertheless, despite the resurgence of an idealistic vision of fraternity and optimism for global understanding through the League of Nations – endorsed by a section of liberal Freemasonry, with Léon Bourgeois assuming the role of its inaugural president in 1920 – a schism had emerged within European obediences. The advent of peace could not obliterate the shortcomings of pre-war pacifism and the patriotic nationalism that each obedience espoused, which persisted after the conflict.

By excluding the Masonic obediences of the defeated states and rejecting the Freemasons of the Central Powers, at least until 1925 with the Locarno Treaties, while associating the actions of the Allied powers with the victory of peace and freedom – thus absolving them from any responsibility for the war – Freemasonry in the Allied nations served to confirm the deep rift that had developed between the lodges and obediences of the warring nations. The conflict resulted in the dissolution of the fraternal bond inherent to Masonic universalism, with each camp no longer recognizing the other as part of the "Universal Temple of Humanity." (Note: Hivert-Messeca 2016, p. 230) In his final report in 1920, Édouard Quartier-la-Tente expressed regret at the lack of recognition from the American Grand Lodges, admitting that his "Masonic faith" had diminished, as Freemasonry had been unable to maintain universal fraternity.

Upon the conclusion of the conflict, the Freemasonries of both the victorious and vanquished states proceeded to align themselves with the internal developments that were characteristic of their respective nations. To reaffirm its orthodox interpretation of Anderson's Constitutions, the United Grand Lodge of England requested that the obediences of the British Empire and the conservative movement refrain from any involvement in national or international political action. (Note: Hivert-Messeca 2016, p. 253) Liberal Freemasonry, in contrast, tended to oscillate between two distinct ideologies. On the one hand, it embraced the utopian ideal of universalism and cosmopolitanism, which originated in the 18th century. On the other hand, it asserted the active role it played in the formation of national identities. To resolve this contradiction, many Freemasons became involved in pacifist projects, in associations aimed at uniting the obediences of the world, such as the International Masonic Association (AMI), which sought to reunite obediences of all persuasions, or in initiatives to construct a federal Europe, with a new utopia that this "ultimate world conflict would give birth to a universal and definitive peace [...]". (Note: Hivert-Messeca 2016, p. 248)

== Bibliography ==
- Hivert-Messeca, Yves (2016). Hiram et Bellone : Les franc-maçons dans la Grande Guerre (1914–1918). L'univers maçonnique (in French). Éditions Dervy. ISBN 979-10-242-0167-2. (Hiram and Bellona allude to the Masonic rite of passage and the goddess of war).
- Combes, André (2018). 1914-1968. La franc-maçonnerie, cœur battant de la république. L'univers maçonnique (in French). Éditions Dervy. ISBN 979-10-24202464.
- Beaurepaire, Pierre-Yves (2018). L'Europe des francs-maçons : XVIIIe – XXIe siècle. Alpha (in French). Paris: Éditions Belin. ISBN 978-2-410-01382-5.
- Zarcone, Thierry (2015). Le Croissant et le compas : Islam et franc-maçonnerie de la fascination à la détestation. Sparga Soligo (in French). Éditions Dervy. ISBN 979-10-242-0119-1.
