= Ordinance of 9 August 1944 =

1944 French law

Provisional Government
- Long title: Order of August 9, 1944 concerning the re-establishment of republican rule of law in mainland France
- Territorial extent: Continental France
- Enacted by: Provisional Government
- Enacted: 9 August 1944

Repeals
- French Constitutional Law of 1940

Summary
- All constitutional laws of the Vichy regime declared void ab initio.
- Status: In force

The Ordinance of 9 August 1944 was a constitutional law enacted by the Provisional Government of the French Republic (GPRF) during the Liberation of France which re-established republican rule of law in mainland France after four years of occupation by Nazi Germany and control by the collaborationist Vichy regime.

== Background ==
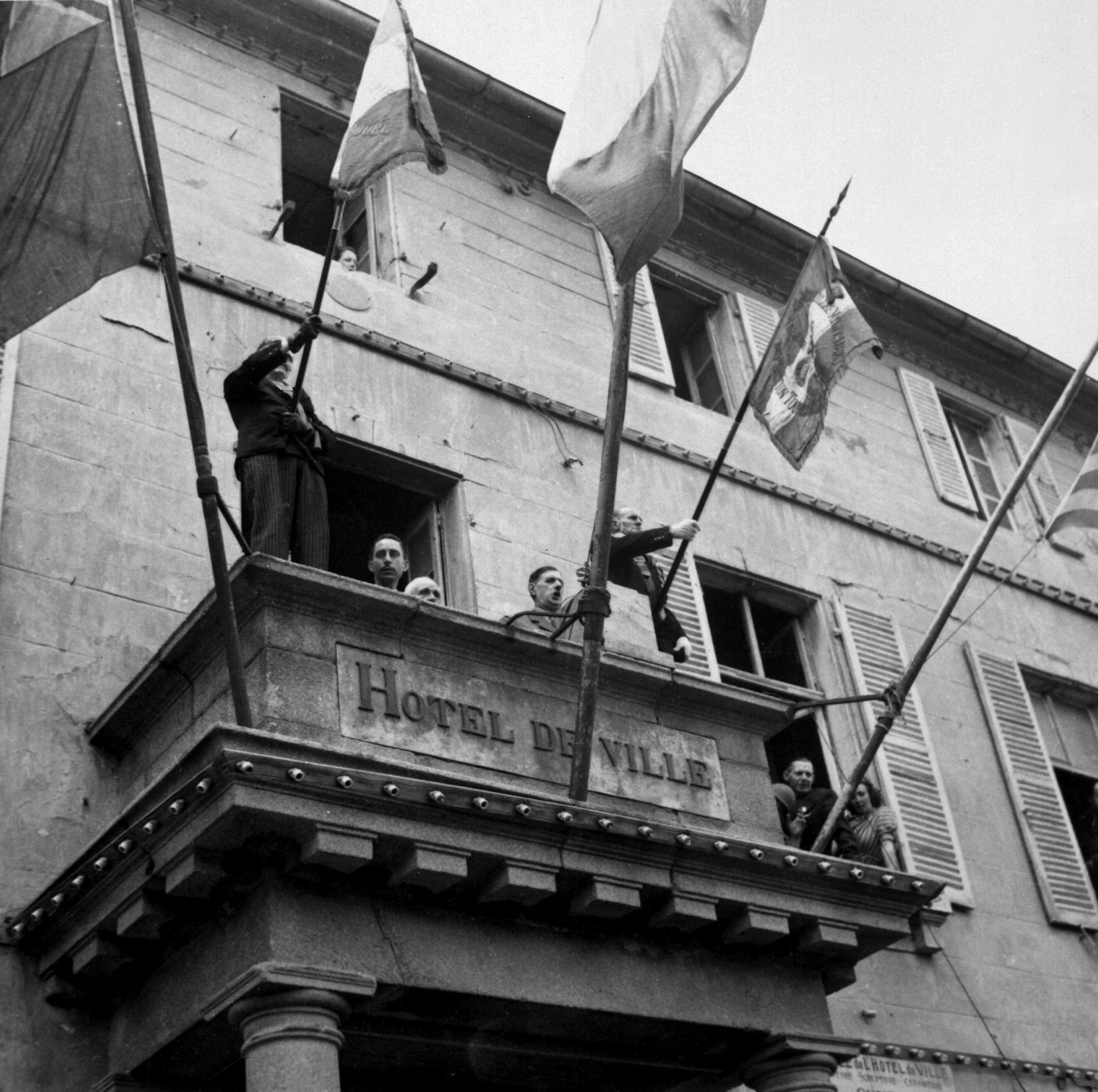
Charles de Gaulle giving a speech in August 1944 in Cherbourg.

The refusal to consider the Vichy regime as a legally constituted authority was a constant in the Free France founded by Charles de Gaulle. Already in his Brazzaville Manifesto of 27 October 1940, the general had proclaimed that there was no longer a French government, and that "the Vichy-based organization that claims to bear this name is unconstitutional and submits to the invader", (Note: "il n'existe plus de gouvernement proprement français" and "L'organisme sis à Vichy et qui prétend porter ce nom est inconstitutionnel et soumis à l'envahisseur.") even as he published on the same day the first Ordinance of Free France establishing the Empire Defense Council, which organized "the legal authority in all parts of the [colonial] Empire liberated from control of the enemy ... based on French legislation prior to 23 June 1940." (Note: "les pouvoirs publics dans toutes les parties de l'Empire libérées du contrôle de l'ennemi [...] sur la base de la législation française antérieure au 23 juin 1940.")

== Contents ==
Promulgated in Algiers by the GPRF led by General de Gaulle, the ordinance expunged all trappings of legality from the Vichy regime, declaring all constitutional regulatory texts enacted by the regime of Pétain and Laval to be void ab initio, (Note: The Vichy laws were declared void ab initio. The intent was that this was not a repeal, which would have given credence to the fact that Vichy laws once were legitimate, but rather that they were never legal in the first place, therefore never in force.) beginning with the Constitutional Law of 10 July 1940. As a consequence, the GPRF did not have to explicitly proclaim the return of the Republic, as the latter had never legally been dissolved. More generally, this ordinance organized the conditions for the transition from the norms in force under Vichy, to republican norms, in the historical context of the Liberation.

Through the text of this ordinance Free France, embodied by the GPRF and led by General de Gaulle, retroactively constituted itself as the continuous and uninterrupted extension of the French Republic. It proclaimed the Vichy regime stripped of all right to present itself as the legal successor of the Third Republic.

This ordinance thus ratified the definitive victory of the government in exile established by de Gaulle as early as 1940 with the Empire Defense Council, which disputed Vichy's claim to legitimate authority, with both parties then claiming sole right to represent France during the war.

Additionally, by explicitly linking France's mode of government to the Republic, the ordinance endorsed a republican vision of France that precluded any legitimacy for a modification of this form of government.

Although the ordinance declared that all Vichy laws were null and void, as reversing all Vichy decisions during the previous four years was impractical, it also stated that only those explicitly listed were invalid.

== Provisions of the ordinance ==
The order was promulgated pursuant to a 3 June 1943 order establishing the French Committee of National Liberation and another a year later which established the Provisional Government of the French Republic. Article 1 states that: "The form of government is and remains the Republic. Legally, it has never ceased to exist." (Note: La forme du Gouvernement est et demeure la République. En droit, celle-ci n'a pas cessé d'exister.) Hence, article 2 follows with, "Consequently, all constitutional, legislative or regulatory acts, as well as the decrees issued for their implementation, under whatever name, promulgated on the mainland territory after 16 June 1940 and until the restoration of the Provisional Government of the French Republic are nullified and made ineffective. This nullification must be expressly acknowledged." (Note: Sont en conséquence, nuls et de nul effet tous les actes constitutionnels, législatifs ou réglementaires, ainsi que les arrêtés pris pour leur exécution, sous quelque dénomination que ce soit, promulgués sur le territoire continental postérieurement au 16 juin 1940 et jusqu'au rétablissement du Gouvernement provisoire de la République française. Cette nullité doit être expressément constatée.)

Article 3 lists the specific constitutional acts that were nullified as follows:

- the French Constitutional Law of 1940
- the constitutional acts of Vichy France
- all acts falling under any of these categories:
  - that established special tribunals, except as specified in article 8
  - that imposed forced labor on behalf of the Nazis
  - relating to secret societies such as Freemasonry
  - Vichy anti-Jewish legislation
  - related to the executory formula in French courts, with the caveat that bearers of certified copies and extracts of documents bearing said formula prescribed by the 16 July 1940 decree will be able to have them carried out

Other canceled acts are mentioned in the ordinance's appendices.

Articles 6-9 organize the transition from the Vichy legal system. Article 6 organizes the entry into force of acts published in official non-Vichy French government journals. Conversely, article 7 governs the termination of Vichy legal acts, which, for acts not mentioned in article 2, must be expressly declared as still in force. This article describes the Vichy regime as "the de facto authority calling itself the 'government of the French State'" and rejects its legality. Article 9 provisionally validates administrative acts dated after 16 June 1940.

Article 10 dissolves all collaborationist organizations and parties, such as the milice. It places their assets under sequestration and punishes any attempt to maintain or reconstitute these organizations.

Article 11 states that the ordinance will be applied to the mainland territory upon its liberation, and that a special ordinance will be issued for the departments of Bas-Rhin, Haut-Rhin and Moselle, which was done on 15 September 1944. Five additional ordinances followed with the last of them passing on 2 November 1945.

In an explanatory memorandum, the ordinance states: "This is the ordinance restoring republican legality on the mainland territory, that is to say in metropolitan France, with the exception of Corsica where the legislative situation, resulting from a liberation prior to the provisions thus taken, calls for a specific text which will be issued shortly." (Note: Telle est l'ordonnance portant rétablissement de la légalité républicaine sur le territoire continental, c'est-à-dire en France métropolitaine, exception faite de la Corse où la situation législative, résultant d'une libération antérieure aux dispositions ainsi prises, appelle un texte particulier qui interviendra incessamment.)

== See also ==
- Charles de Gaulle
- Clandestine press of the French Resistance
- Free France
- French Constitution of 27 October 1946
- French Fourth Republic
- French Third Republic
- Liberation of France
