= On purge bébé =

1931 film directed by Jean Renoir

- Theatrical poster
- Directed by: Jean Renoir
- Written by: Georges Feydeau (play)
- Produced by: Pierre Braunberger
- Starring: Marguerite Pierry; Jacques Louvigny; Michel Simon
- Cinematography: Theodor Sparkuhl
- Edited by: Jean Mamy
- Music by: Paul Misraki
- Distributed by: Les Etablissement Braunberger-Richebé
- Release date: 21 June 1931
- Running time: 52 minutes
- Country: France
- Language: French

On purge bébé (Baby's Laxative) is Jean Renoir's first sound film, based upon the play by Georges Feydeau. It is a 1931 comedy about a supposedly unbreakable chamberpot and a constipated baby. It is known for mocking the French bourgeoisie.

Renoir made the film in a record three weeks (from script to finished film) in order to get backing for other projects. His next film was La Chienne.

== Synopsis ==
Mr. Follavoine seeks to sell unbreakable chamberpots to the French army. In an attempt to close the deal, he invites Chouilloux, an influential official of the Ministry of hosts, for dinner to discuss putting his chamberpots on the market. But on that same day, Follavoine's son is constipated and Mrs. Follavoine tries to force him to take his laxative, but he flat out refuses to take it. From that point on, nothing goes as planned.

== Release ==
On 14 June 2016, American video-distribution company The Criterion Collection released On purge bébé, newly restored through a 4K digital transfer, as a bonus feature for the release of La Chienne on Blu-ray and DVD.
