= Luis Simarro Lacabra =

Spanish neurologist (1851–1921)

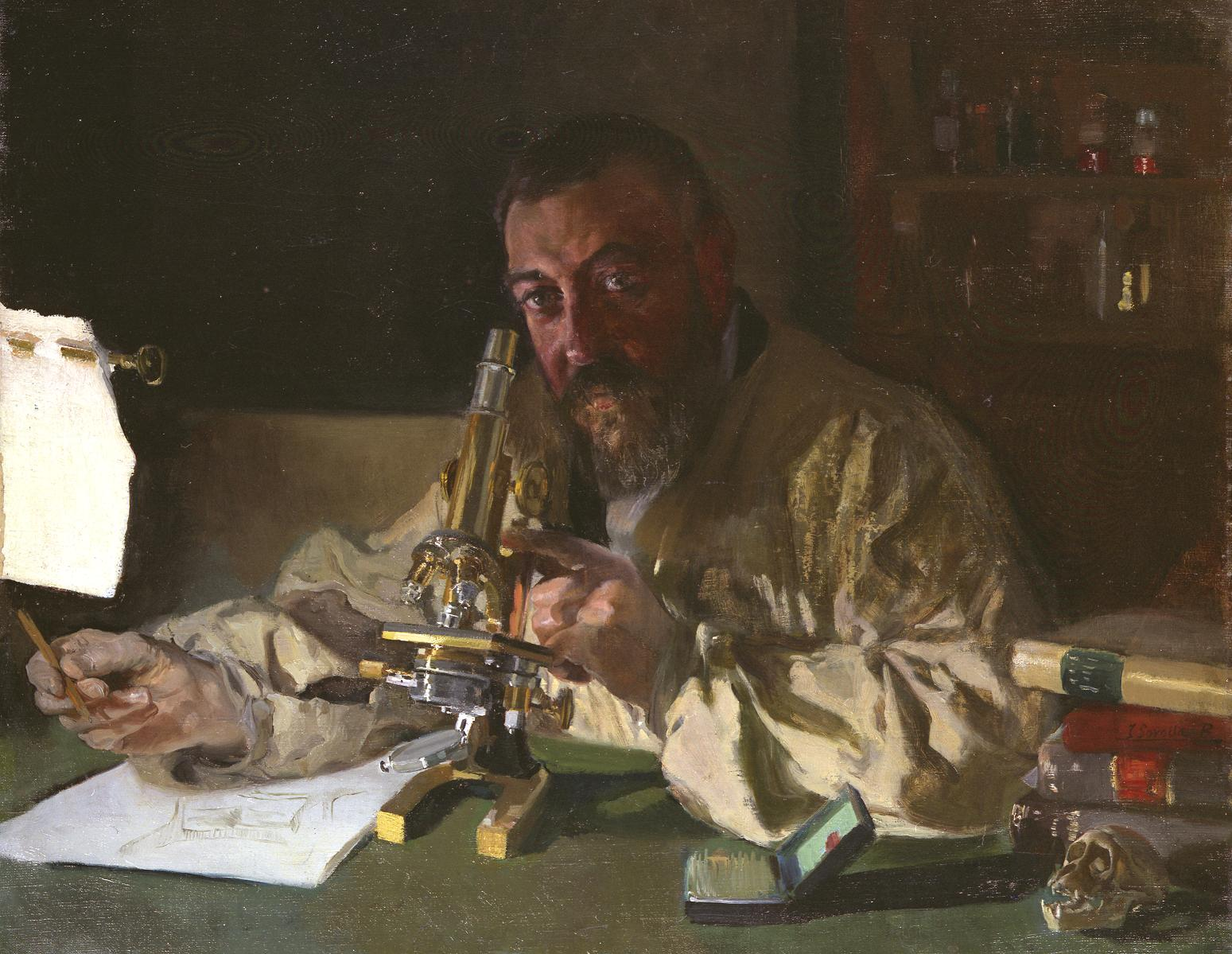
- Portrait of Dr Simarro at the microscope by Joaquín Sorolla, 1897
- Born: 6 January 1851; Rome, Papal States
- Died: 19 June 1921 (aged 70); Madrid, Spain
- Education: Complutense University of Madrid; University of Valencia
- Scientific career
- Fields: Neurology
- Workplaces: Complutense University of Madrid

Luis Simarro Lacabra (6 January 1851 – 19 June 1921) was a Spanish neurologist who was born in Rome while his parents were living in the Papal States.

== Career ==
He studied medicine in Valencia and Madrid, and in 1877 was appointed director of the Santa Isabel insane asylum at Leganés, outside of Madrid. From 1880 he lived in Paris and studied general anatomy and histology with Louis-Antoine Ranvier and clinical neurology under Jean Martin Charcot. Here he also came under the influence of philosopher Ernest Renan (1823–1892), anatomist Mathias-Marie Duval (1844–1907) and psychiatrist Valentin Magnan (1835–1916). In 1885 he returned to Madrid and opened a private practice, and in 1902 was appointed to the first chair of experimental psychology in Spain.

As a psychiatrist, Simarro was heavily influenced by developments in Germany, particularly Emil Kraepelin's classification and treatment of the insane, Wilhelm Wundt's theory of experimental psychology and Theodor Ziehen's critical analysis of Wundt's approach to psychology.

Notwithstanding his work in psychiatry, Simarro is largely remembered for a contribution made in histology when he developed a silver bromide modification of Camillo Golgi's silver chromate technique. Famed Spanish histologist Ramón y Cajal recognized Simarro's achievement, and mentioned that it was a milestone that allowed him to abandon general histology and to focus on neurohistology.

== Bibliography ==
- Bandrés, J. (2022). Luis Simarro y sus contemporáneos. Madrid: Academia de Psicología de España y Sanz y Torres.
- Bandrés, J., Llavona, R. y Campos, J. (1996). Luis Simarro. En M. Saiz y D. Saiz (Coords.) Personajes para una Historia de la Psicología en España. (pp. 185-199). Madrid: Pirámide.
- Campos, J.J. (2006) Un día en el Arco de Santa María. In Santiago Ramón y Cajal, 100 años después Eds. A. Ferrús y A. Gamundí. Madrid: Editorial Pirámide, pp. 62–92.
- Campos, J.J. (2006) Trayectoria y circunstancias de Cajal y Simarro. In Santiago Ramón y Cajal, 100 años después Eds. A. Ferrús y A. Gamundí. Madrid: Editorial Pirámide, pp. 93–129.
- Campos, J.J. (2002) Luís Simarro y el origen de la Neurología en España. In Historia de la Neurología en España, Ed. A. Martín Araguz. Madrid: GlaxoSmithKline, pp. 119–127.
- Campos Bueno, JJ, (2010) Art and Science in Sorolla’s Painting A Research in Dr. Simarro’s Lab. Psychologia Latina, 1, 9–26
- Carpintero, H.(2004). El Doctor Simarro y la Psicología española. Anales de la Real Academia de Ciencias Morales y Políticas, 79, 193-214.
- Carpintero, H. (2014). Luis Simarro. De la Psicología científica al compromiso ético. Valencia: UPV
- Carpintero, H., Campos, J.J., Bandrés, J. (2002) Luís Simarro y la Psicología Científica en España. Cien Años de la cátedra de Psicología Experimental en la Universidad de Madrid, Madrid: Universidad Complutense.
- CMC (Carlos María Cortezo) (1921) Luis Simarro, Siglo Médico, 78: 616-617.
- Fernández-Galiano, D. (1994) Apuntes sobre la historia de la microscopía en España, Microbiología Sem., 10: 343-356.
- Kaplan, T. M. (1971a) Luis Simarro, Spanish histologist, Congreso nacional de historia de la medicina (Valencia 1969). Sociedad Española de Historia de la Medicina, 2: 523-533.
- Kaplan, T. M.. (1971b) Luis Simarro’s psychological theories, Congresso nacional de historia de la medicina (Valencia 1969). Sociedad Española de Historia de la Medicina, 2: 545-555.
- López Piñero, J. M. (1983) Diccionario histórico de la ciencia moderna en España, Barcelona: Península, pp. 327–330.
- Ramón y Cajal, S. (1937) Recollections of My Life, trans. E. H. Craigie, Philadelphia: American Philosophical Society, vol. 2, pp. 307–308.
- Vidal Parellada, A. (2007). Luis Simarro y su tiempo. Madrid: CSIC
