= French League =

French collaborationist movement

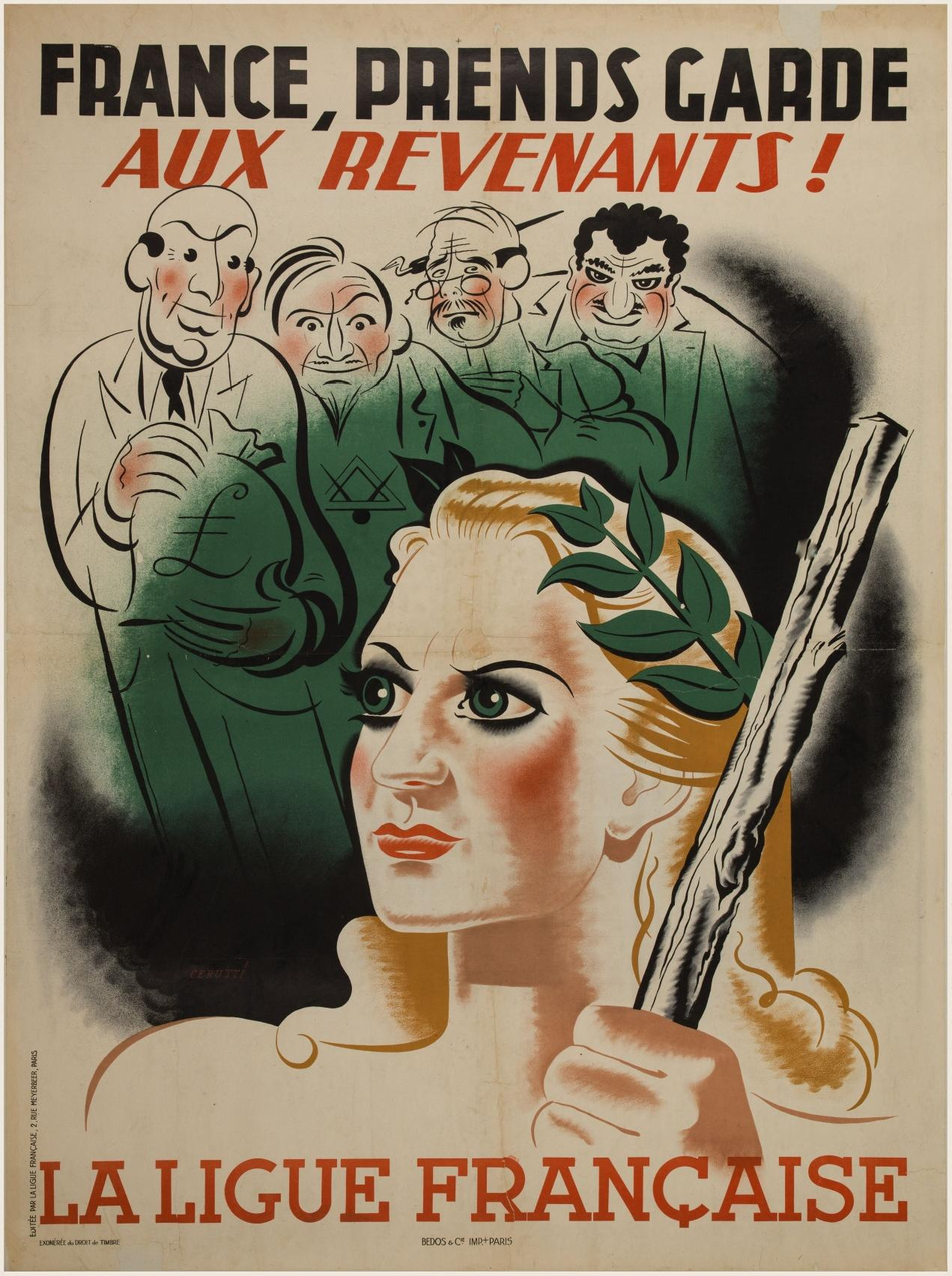
Anglophobic, anti-Masonic and antisemitic propaganda poster for the French League, 1941.

The French League (French: Ligue française d’épuration, d’entraide sociale et de collaboration européenne: "French League for purging, mutual aid and European collaboration") was a collaborationist French movement founded by Pierre Costantini in September 1940. Its journal was entitled L'Appel.

== Bibliography ==
- Pierre Philippe Lambert, Gérard Le Marec, Partis et mouvements de la collaboration, éditions Jacques Grancher, 1993.
- Pascal Ory, Les Collaborateurs, éditions du seuil, Paris, 1976,
