= Pierre Costantini =

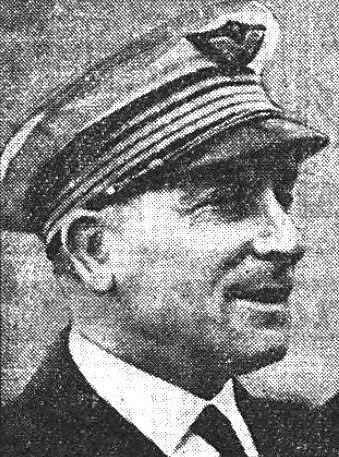
- Pierre Costantini in 1941
- Born: 16 February 1889; Sartène, Corsica, France
- Died: 30 June 1986 (aged 97)
- Citizenship: French
- Occupations: Journalist, soldier, politician

Pierre Dominique Costantini (16 February 1889 – 30 June 1986) was a French soldier, journalist, and writer.

== Life ==
Costantini fought as an officer in the First World War and as a reserve officer in the armée de l'air during 1939–1940. He founded the Mouvement social européen. In 1940, he founded the collaborationist Ligue française d’épuration, d’entraide sociale et de collaboration européenne and with Jean Boissel, Marcel Déat, Pierre Clémenti (politician) and Eugène Deloncle co-founded the Légion des volontaires français contre le bolchevisme (LVF). He edited the Ligue's organ, the journal L'Appel. In 1943, he founded the Union des journalistes anti-maçons. He fled to Sigmaringen in 1944 and was condemned to prison in 1952. He later pursued a journalistic career and published several essays.

== Works ==
- La Grande pensée de Bonaparte, Paris, Éditions Baudinière, 1940.
- La Haute signification de la Légion des volontaires français contre le bolchevisme, Paris, L.V.F., [circa 1942].
- Ode au masque de Napoléon, Paris, Éditions Baudinière, 1943.

== Bibliography ==
- Pascal Ory, Les collaborateurs, éditions du seuil, Paris, 1976.
