= L'Appel =

L'Appel (The Calling) was a collaborationist periodical of Vichy France. It was the organ of the collaborationist French League and edited by the League's leader, Pierre Costantini of the Parti populaire français (PPF). The paper was established in 1940. Its two main contributors were Robert Julien-Courtine (1910–1998) and Paul Riche, the latter being a pseudonym of Jean Mamy. Mamy was condemned to death executed for treason and executed at the fortress of Montrouge on 29 March 1949.
