= Pascal Ory =

French historian

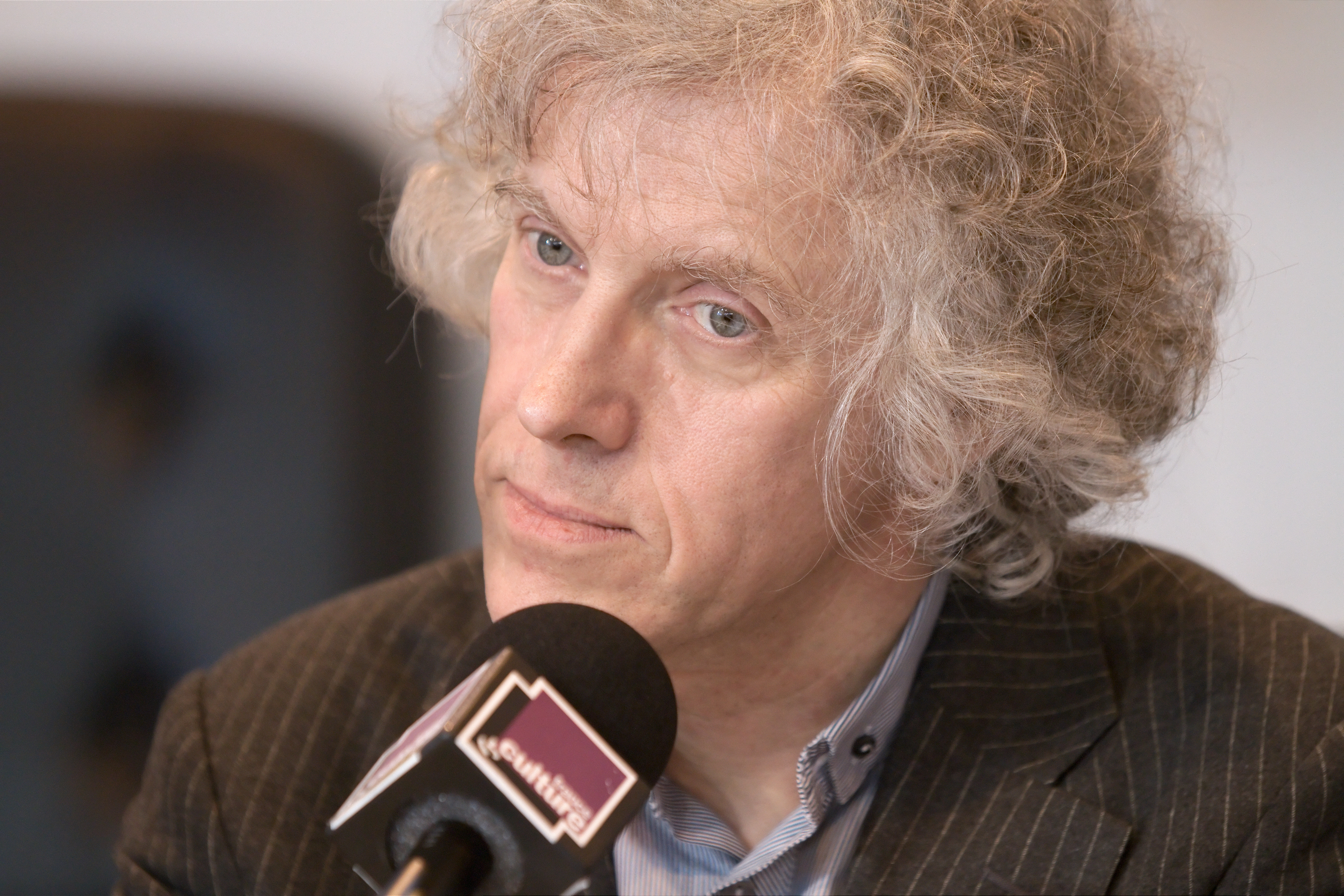
- Ory during a France Culture broadcast at the Paris Expo Porte de Versailles, March 2010
- Born: 31 July 1948 (age 78); Fougères, Ille-et-Vilaine, French Fourth Republic
- Occupation: Historian
- Employer(s): Sciences Po, EHESS and Pantheon-Sorbonne University
- Known for: Contemporary historian
- Political party: PS
- Spouses: Agnès Saal (m. 1982; div. 1986) Anne Le Davay (m. 1987)
- Children: 4
- Website: Pascal Ory publications on Academia.edu

Pascal Ory (French pronunciation: [paskal ɔʁi]; born 31 July 1948) is a French historian. A student of René Rémond, he specialises in cultural and political history and has written on Fascism ever since his master's dissertation on the Greenshirts of Henri Dorgères. In the 1970s, he contributed to a better definition of cultural history.

Ory is a professor at the Paris 1 Panthéon-Sorbonne University. He is president of the Association pour le développement de l'histoire culturelle (ADHC) and regent of the Collège de 'Pataphysique.

Involved in politics, he was a municipal councillor, formerly an ally to the mayor Georges Lemoine, and head of the socialist list in the municipal elections of March 2001, in the city of Chartres.

Ory was elected to the Académie Française on 4 March 2021.

== Works ==
- Les Collaborateurs 1940–1945, Le Seuil, 1976, 331 p. nouv. éd., coll. « Points »-histoire 1980
- La France allemande, Gallimard, "archives", 1977
- Nizan – Destin d'un révolté, 1980
- Le Petit Nazi illustré. Vie et mort du "Téméraire" (1943–1944), Paris, éditions Albatros, collections Histoires/Imaginaires, 1979, 122 p. rééd. revue et augmentée, Paris, Nautilus, 2002. Preface by Léon Poliakov – on a Nazi propaganda review for children
- L'Anarchisme de droite ou du mépris considéré comme une morale, le tout assorti de réflexions plus générales, Grasset, Paris, 1985, 288p. – an openly polemical work "dedicated to the anarchists of the left"
- Une nation pour mémoire. 1889, 1939, 1989 trois jubilés révolutionnaires, Paris, PFNSP, 1992, 282p.
- Direction, préface et conclusions de : La Censure en France à l'ère démocratique (1848–...), Complexe, coll. « Histoire culturelle », 1997, 358 p.
- L'Europe ? L'Europe... (anthologie commentée), Omnibus, 1998, 900 p.
- Le Discours gastronomique français des origines à nos jours, Gallimard, collection "Archives", 1998, 203 p.
- Les Intellectuels en France de l'Affaire Dreyfus à nos jours, in collaboration with Jean-François Sirinelli, réédition Armand Colin, 1999, 264 p.
- Les Intellectuels en France, de l’Affaire Dreyfus à nos jours, republished and expanded, Paris, Armand Colin, 2002.
- Du fascisme, Paris, Perrin, 2003, 293 p.
- L'Histoire culturelle, Paris, Presses universitaires de France, 2004, 128 p.
- Goscinny (1926–1977) : La liberté d'en rire, Paris, Perrin, 2007.
- L'invention du bronzage – Essai d'une histoire culturelle : Complexe (Editions), June 2008, 135 p.
- La culture comme aventure. Treize exercices d'histoire culturelle, Complexe, 2008

== Honours ==
- Commandeurs of the Ordre des Arts et des Lettres: 2012
- Chevaliers of the Ordre national du Mérite
- Chevalier de la Légion d’Honneur
