= Jean Marquès-Rivière =

French journalist, writer and screenwriter (1903–2000)

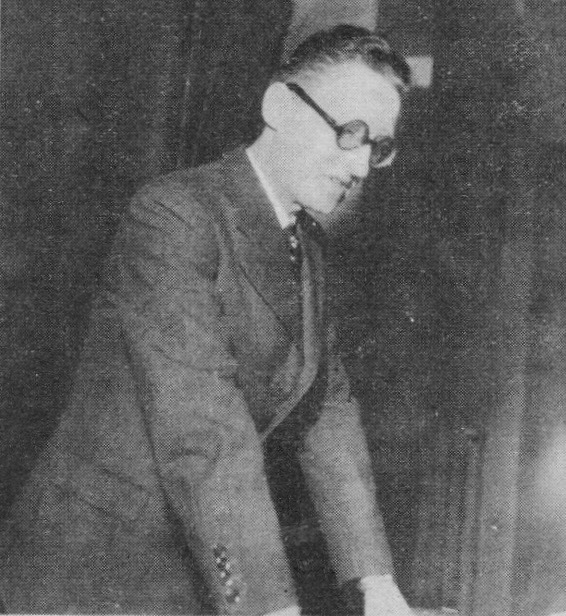
Marques Riviere, Jean

Jean Marquès-Rivière (1903–2000) was a French journalist, writer and screenwriter.

== Works ==
- À l'ombre des monastères thibétains, preface by Maurice Magre, Paris, Éditions Victor Attinger, 1930; édition revue et définitive avec une postface de l'auteur postface, Milano, Arche / Paris, Dervy diffusion-livres, 1981.
- Les Dangers des plans magiques, Paris, Bibliothèque Chacornac, 1931. Extrait de la Revue Le Voile d'Isis.
- La Trahison spirituelle de la Franc-Maçonnerie, Ed. des Portiques, Paris, 1931.
- L'USSR dans le monde, Viance preface by Georges Viance, Paris, Payot, "Collection d'études, de documents et de témoignages pour servir à l'histoire de notre temps", 1935.
- La Chine dans le monde. La Révolution chinoise, 1912 to 1935, foreword by RP Joseph de Reviers de Mauny, Paris: Payot, "Collection d'études, of documents of témoignages et pour l'histoire serve de notre temps", 1935
- with William Henry, Les Grands secrets de la Franc-maçonnerie, Paris, Baudinière, 1935.
- L'Organisation secrète de la Franc-Maçonnerie, Paris, 1936.
- Comment la France fait la Révolution, Paris, 1938
- Amulettes, talismans et pantacles dans les traditions orientales et occidentales, preface by Paul Masson-Oursel, Paris, Payot, 1938.
- Histoire des doctrines ésotériques, Paris, Payot, "Aux confins de la science", 1940; repr. 1971.
- Exposition: Le Juif et la France au Palais Berlitz, preface by P. Lézine, Paris, Institut d'étude des questions juives, (sd) [1941].
- Exposition maçonnique de Rouen. Guide du visiteur, 1941.
- Histoire de la Franc-Maçonnerie française, Paris, 1941.
- Rituels Les secrets de la Franc-Maçonnerie, Paris, Baudiniere, 1941.
- Sainte Upanisad de la Bhagavad Gita. Introduction, texte et commentaire traduits du Sanskrit, Arche, Milano, 1979.
- Kalachakra. Initiation tantrique du Dalaï-Lama, Robert Laffont, Paris, 1985
