= Le Bossu =

Bossu and Le Bossu (French for "The Hunchback") may refer to:

- René Le Bossu (1631–1680), French critic
- Jean Bossu (architect) (1912-1983), French architect
- Jean Bossu (historian) (1911-1985), French historian
- Le Bossu (novel), a French historical adventure novel by Paul Féval
- Le Bossu (1925 film), a French silent film directed by Jean Kemm
- Le Bossu (1944 film), a French film of 1944
- Le Bossu (1959 film), a film directed by André Hunebelle, starring Jean Marais and Bourvil
- Le Bossu (1997 film), a film directed by Philippe de Broca, starring Daniel Auteuil and Fabrice Luchini
- Adam de la Halle (1237–1288), also known as Adam le Bossu
- Robert de Beaumont, 2nd Earl of Leicester (1104–1168), also known as Robert le Bossu
- Le Bossu, a secondary supervillain in the Batman R.I.P. storyline

== See also ==
- Hunchback (disambiguation)
- Bertrand Bossu (born 1980), French footballer
- Jean Bernard Bossu (1720-1792), French officer and explorer
- Bossou Ashadeh, a loa in Haitian vodou
