= Hunchback (disambiguation) =

Hunchback or The Hunchback can refer to:

== General ==
- Outdated term for a person suffering from severe kyphosis (from Greek κυφός / kyphos, as a hump)
- List of people known as the Hunchback
- Hunchback (gene), in the genome of Drosophila embryogenesis
- Mosul, Iraq, a city nicknamed "The Hunchback" after the leaning minaret of the Great Mosque of al-Nuri

== Arts or entertainment ==
- The Hunchback of Notre-Dame, Gothic novel by Victor Hugo
  - The eponymous protagonist of Quasimodo
  - Hunchback (video game), a 1983 Arcade and computer game
  - The Hunchback (1997 film), a 1997 television film directed by Peter Medak
- The Hunchback (play), 1832 London play by James Sheridan Knowles
- Le Bossu (The Hunchback in French), an 1858 French historical adventure novel by Paul Féval
- The Hunchback (EP), a 2009 EP by Kurt Vile & the Violators
- Hunchback (novella), a 2023 Japanese novel written by Saou Ichikawa and awarded an Akutagawa Prize
- The Hunchback (1914 film), a 1914 American silent film featuring Lillian Gish
- List of hunchback characters in fiction

== Military ==
- USS Hunchback, a steam-powered gunboat used by the U.S. Navy during the Civil War
- Ilyushin Il-2, nicknamed "The Hunchback", a Soviet World War II ground-attack aircraft

== See also ==
- The Hunchback of Notre Dame (disambiguation)
- Comprachicos
