= The Hunchback of Notre Dame (disambiguation) =

The Hunchback of Notre-Dame is an 1831 novel by Victor Hugo.

The Hunchback of Notre Dame may also refer to the novel's adaptations:

== Films ==
- The Hunchback of Notre Dame (1911 film), a French film released as Notre-Dame de Paris
- The Hunchback of Notre Dame (1923 film), a silent film starring Lon Chaney, Sr. as Quasimodo
- The Hunchback of Notre Dame (1939 film), featuring Charles Laughton
- The Hunchback of Notre Dame (1956 film), with Anthony Quinn
- The Hunchback of Notre Dame (1982 film), starring Anthony Hopkins and Derek Jacobi
- The Hunchback of Notre Dame (1986 film), an Australian animated film
- The Hunchback of Notre Dame (1996 film), an animated film by Walt Disney Animation Studios
- The Hunchback of Notre Dame, a 1996 animated film by Golden Films
- The Hunchback of Notre Dame, a 1996 animated film by Jetlag Productions
- The Hunchback of Notre Dame, a 1996 animated film by Burbank Animation Studios
- The Hunchback of Notre Dame II, a 2002 direct-to-video sequel to the Walt Disney film

== In television and radio ==
- The Hunchback of Notre Dame (1966 TV series), a British television series
- The Hunchback of Notre Dame (1976 film), a British feature-length adaptation
- The Hunchback (1997 film) aka The Hunchback of Notre Dame (alternate title), an American feature-length adaption
- The Hunchback of Notre-Dame, a radio drama produced by Radio Tales for National Public Radio

== In music ==
- The Hunchback of Notre Dame, an album by Alec R. Costandinos and the Syncophonic Orchestra
- The Hunchback of Notre Dame (Dennis DeYoung album), a 1996 recording of music written by Dennis DeYoung for his musical adaptation
- The Hunchback of Notre Dame (soundtrack), the soundtrack to Disney's 1996 animated feature
- The Hunchback of Notre Dame (musical), based on the 1996 Disney film

== Other uses ==
- The Hunchback of Notre Dame (franchise)
- The Hunchback of Notre Dame, a ballet choreographed by Ronald Hynd in 1988
- Vox Lumiere - Hunchback of Notre Dame in 2005 by composer Kevin Saunders Hayes

== See also ==
- Der Glöckner von Notre Dame, a 1999 Berlin musical adapted from the Disney adaptation
- Hunchback (disambiguation)
- Klokkeren fra Notre Dame (musical), a 2002 Danish musical written and composed by Knud Christensen (better known as Sebastian), based on the Hugo novel
- Notre-Dame de Paris (musical), a 1998 French musical
