= French Freemasonry during the interwar period =

During the interwar period, French Freemasonry entered a phase of both renewed engagement and internal reflection following the First World War. The two main obediences, the Grand Orient de France and the Grande Loge de France, maintained a relationship characterized by both cooperation and rivalry. They shared support for left-wing political movements and opposition to the rise of totalitarianism in Europe, as well as to the resurgence of clericalism and nationalism. Placing part of their expectations in the League of Nations and the idea of a peaceful Europe, they witnessed the dissolution of German Freemasonry under Nazism and supported Italian Freemasonry in its opposition to Benito Mussolini’s fascist regime.

== Historical background ==
At the end of the First World War, French Masonic obediences, after commemorating the numerous casualties of the conflict, entered a period of renewed activity and recruitment. Lodge memberships had been significantly reduced by wartime losses among Freemasons and by the near suspension of recruitment during the war.

=== Political struggle after the war ===
==== Loss of political influence and Decline in Direct Engagement ====
In 1919, the Grand Orient de France promoted a program directed toward the republican bloc, emphasizing the defense of secularism, constitutional reform, and economic initiatives. In the context of rising European nationalism after the First World War, internal divisions among radical republicans, concerns generated by the Bolshevik Revolution, and discontent among French investors affected by the Franco-Russian loans, the political left became fragmented and experienced a major electoral defeat. The National Bloc, which secured a parliamentary majority, formed the “blue horizon chamber,” marking the return of right-wing parties to power after three decades. Alexandre Millerand, a former socialist and member of the Grand Orient de France, became aligned with conservative interests and the Committee of Ironmasters, signaling a reactionary shift amid a severe postwar financial crisis. During its 1918 convent, the Grand Orient de France denounced this resurgence of reactionary forces and called for a review of the trials of Joseph Caillaux and Louis Malvy, whom it regarded as victims of judicial error.

The acquittal of Raoul Villain, the assassin of Jean Jaurès, prompted renewed mobilization and protest within French Freemasonry, which also condemned the continued enforcement of martial law and censorship in certain colonies. The affair of the Cards and the perceived opportunism of several Freemason deputies complicated efforts to defend the political gains of the prewar parliamentary left. Lodges adopted resolutions advocating the potential convening of Masonic parliamentarians who no longer supported lodge initiatives and recommended that future backing be reserved for those who remained committed to Masonic principles. Despite maintaining an interest in political engagement, the proposals addressed by lodges and convents to Masonic deputies during this period became primarily informative rather than directive. Many Radical-Socialist deputies who were Freemasons tended to vote according to personal convictions or political interests rather than in alignment with Masonic positions.

The 1924 elections marked a renewed phase of political engagement for French Masonic obediences, which supported efforts to unite left-wing forces. Under the leadership of Grand Master Arthur Groussier, the Grand Orient de France issued an appeal for unity accompanied by a detailed and widely distributed program. The Grande Loge de France also mobilized its members, formulated progressive proposals, and organized a public conference at its headquarters under Grand Master Gustave Mesureur with the slogan “Let us unite against reaction.” The victory of the Cartel des Gauches in May 1924 was positively received by the obediences, and the Grand Orient de France issued a communiqué urging parliamentarians to fully implement its proposed program.

In 1922, the publication of the 22nd condition of the Third Communist International prohibited members of the Communist Party from belonging to Freemasonry, which it characterized as a “bourgeois political organization.” Some Communist Freemasons complied with this directive and resigned from their lodges, while others chose to leave the Communist Party. Among the latter was Antonio Coen, who later became Grand Master of the Grande Loge de France.

==== Return of clericalism ====
The proposal to reestablish a French embassy to the Vatican and restore relations with the Roman Curia prompted mobilization within parts of French Freemasonry. The Grand Orient de France opposed the initiative, viewing it as a revival of clericalism and a challenge to the secular principles established under the Third Republic. It expressed concern that the measure could undermine the 1905 law on the separation of Church and State and urged Masonic deputies to vote against the bill. Some members, however, saw the debate as an opportunity to revitalize Masonic lodges and restore their prewar influence. During this period, Masonic activism had declined, while conservative movements, ideologically influenced by Charles Maurras and politically aligned with the National Bloc, gained strength in reaction to the Bolshevik Revolution and the perceived threat it posed to Europe.

In 1920, a propaganda leaflet called on republicans to oppose the proposed bill restoring relations with the Vatican. It also denounced the return of religious teaching congregations, the maintenance of military chaplaincies, and the continued application of the Concordat in Alsace-Lorraine. In 1922, the Grand Orient de France issued strong criticisms of the pope and religious obscurantism. In the years following the war, however, such statements became largely rhetorical and received less public attention, reflecting a decline in the organization’s political influence. This decline was further illustrated by the attitudes of several leaders of the Grande Loge de France between 1930 and 1940, some of whom did not oppose the normalization of relations with the papacy. In articles published in Le Symbolisme, Albert Lantoine discussed the possibility of reconciliation between the Catholic Church and Freemasonry. His open letter to the pope, prefaced by Freemason and spiritualist writer Oswald Wirth, advocated ending what he viewed as an outdated conflict in light of the growing threat of communist and fascist totalitarianism. This conciliatory position remained controversial within the Grande Loge de France. Grand Master Michel Dumesnil de Gramont recalled the numerous papal encyclicals condemning Freemasonry, suggesting that the Church could withdraw them as an initial gesture of goodwill. He also argued that the destruction of the Republic and of Spanish Freemasonry aligned with the Church’s objectives, which could, he warned, one day extend to France.

=== Masonic pacifism ===
During the First World War, the lodges and members of French Masonic obediences perceived the conflict as a dual challenge to Masonic values: the principle of fraternity and the internal divisions caused by nationalism. After the war, pacifist sentiment, which had emerged across Europe, also influenced Masonic lodges. The pacifist commitments of interwar Freemasonry differed from those that had shaped the movement in the eighteenth and nineteenth centuries. In this period, Masonic principles were associated with pacifist ideals aimed at promoting social progress, education, and the preservation of civilization. However, these values were not unique to Freemasonry, which limited its distinctiveness and made it more vulnerable to external challenges.

In 1921, the International Masonic Association (AMI) was established to promote closer relations among European Masonic obediences. The organization was inspired by the former Bureau International des Relations Maçonniques, directed during the First World War by Swiss Freemason Édouard Quartier-la-Tente. Despite its creation, national sensitivities persisted, and the prominence of French Freemasonry within the association generated tensions among members. These disagreements reflected differing conceptions of Masonic pacifism, which the Swiss Grand Lodge Alpina, host of the AMI, sought to reconcile through a minimal framework focused on nationalism, international cooperation, and economic peace.

The diversity of Masonic pacifist cultures, offering numerous ways to conceive of peace, combined with enduring and often more effective national particularities than any unanimity of opinion, resulted in the theorization of a concept of peace without a clear pacifist doctrine. This lack of a clear commitment led some detractors to label the moral and humanitarian aspect of its pacifist strategy as “salon or lodge pacifism.” In the end, none of the major events that shook the interwar years deeply altered the official stance of the Masonic orders involved in the AMI, which remained one of moral and humanist pacifism—and, like many other pacifist movements, largely ineffective.

== Stavisky affair ==
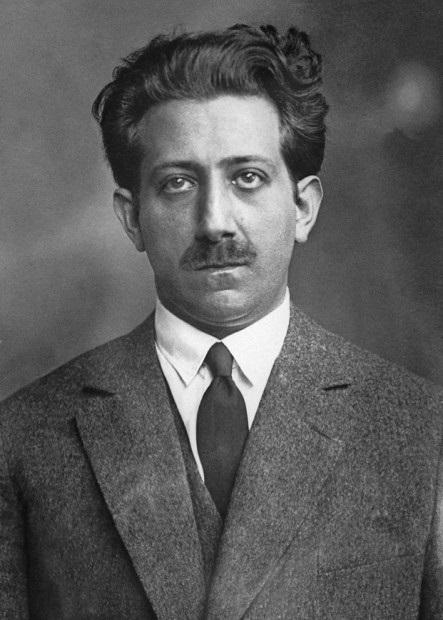
Alexandre Stavisky.

During the interwar period, unlike the Affaire des Fiches, in which the Grand Orient de France was involved and assumed responsibility through Louis Lafferre, the involvement of Masonic obediences in the political and financial scandal surrounding Alexandre Stavisky and Councillor Albert Prince was never proven. Nevertheless, anti-Masonic groups during the scandal suggested that Freemasonry bore some degree of responsibility in the affair, which affected the French Republic in the 1930s. Historical research has established that neither Stavisky nor Leprince were Freemasons, although Stavisky conducted his illicit activities within a network of speculators and political figures, some of whom were members of Masonic orders. This network of relationships was revealed by Councillor Albert Prince, who documented the political and judicial connections that Stavisky used to evade and postpone the trials in which he was implicated. Camille Chautemps, President of the Council and a Freemason, was implicated in the scandal, which contributed to the fall of his cabinet in December 1933.

The death of Alexandre Stavisky, the dismissal of Prefect Jean Chiappe, and attacks by Léon Daudet in the nationalist press contributed to the riot of February 6, 1934, which led to the fall of Édouard Daladier’s second government. The accusations intensified following the death of Councillor Leprince, whose body was found on a railway line, with Léon Daudet again attributing responsibility to Freemasonry.

The severity of the crisis prompted discussion within the Grande Loge de France regarding the conduct of certain members implicated in the scandal. In his work Les Lézardes du Temple, Albert Lantoine criticized Masonic members he considered opportunistic for compromising the Order for personal or financial gain and also questioned the recruitment practices of the Grande Loge. During the 1934 convent of the Grand Orient, petitions were submitted to highlight the seriousness of accusations against specific Freemasons and to advocate for the removal of members directly involved in the affair. However, many lodges interpreted these actions not as criticisms of corrupt individuals but as attempts to challenge the republican principles that Freemasonry upheld. Two complementary approaches guided the obediences’ response: one emphasizing the defense of Masonic and republican ideals, and the other seeking to remove members considered corrupt in order to restore the Order’s public role in society.

== See also ==
- Freemasonry during World War I

== Bibliography ==
- Morlat, Patrice (2019). La République des Frères : Le Grand Orient de France de 1870 à 1940 [The Republic of Brothers: The Grand Orient of France from 1870 to 1940] (in French). Éditions Perrin. ISBN 978-2-262-07726-6.
- Combes, André (2018). 1914-1968. La franc-maçonnerie, cœur battant de la république [1914-1968. Freemasonry, the beating heart of the republic]. L'univers maçonnique (in French). Éditions Dervy. ISBN 979-10-242-0246-4. OCLC 1027878270.
- Chevalier, Pierre (1975). Histoire de la franc-maçonnerie française : La maçonnerie : Église de la République [History of French Freemasonry: Masonry: Church of the Republic]. Les Grandes études historiques (in French). Vol. 3. Librairie Arthème Fayard. ISBN 2-213-00162-6.
- Martin, Luis (2000). "Le pacifisme et la franc-maçonnerie dans l'Europe de l'entre-deux-guerres" [Pacifism and Freemasonry in Europe between the wars]. Les francs-maçons dans la cité [Freemasons in the city] (in French). Presses universitaires de Rennes. ISBN 978-2-7535-2552-8.
