= French Freemasonry under the Second Republic =

Freemasonry under the French Second Republic

French Freemasonry under the Second Republic experienced a period that ranged from euphoria over the advent of the Republic to rapid disillusionment. The implementation of many of its ideals, such as the abolition of slavery, and the large number of Freemasons in national bodies, fueled hopes of a “Masonic republic”, which were quickly extinguished by the workers' riots of June 1848. The law of July 1848 regulated club activity and increased pressure from the authorities, prompting the Grand Lodge to exercise caution.

When it drew up its first constitution, the Grand Orient de France, the main Lodge, introduced the republican motto - Liberté, Égalité, Fraternité - in Article 1. It also enshrines the existence of God and the immortality of the soul as the intangible basis of Freemasonry. This spiritualist affirmation ushered in a long debate and sometimes disputed over freedom of conscience among his Grand lodges. The Supreme Council of France, the country's second-largest Grand Lodge and occasional rival of the main Grand Lodge, remained on the sidelines. A proposal for overhauling the Masonic order emerged from its ranks.

Tempted by Bonapartism, French Freemasonry partly supported the election of Prince Louis-Napoléon. Put under tutelage after the coup d'état of December 2, 1851, it submitted to the authoritarianism of the new regime to ensure its survival.

== History ==
=== July Monarchy ===
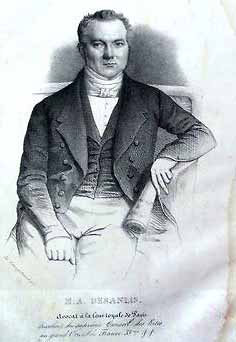
Marie-Auguste Desanlis.

The Masonic landscape under the July monarchy was divided into three Lodges, all liberal: the largest, the Grand Orient de France, with 295 symbolic lodges and 168 high-grade workshops; the Suprême Conseil de France, to which 63 workshops of all grades belong; and the small Lodge of Misraïm. The number of Freemasons was estimated, as no count has been made, due to the large number of initiations and resignations. Historians estimate the number of members to be around 20,000, all lodges combined. French Freemasonry remained predominantly bourgeois and conformist.

The Three Glorious Years of 1830 and the Paris and Lyon riots of 1834 led to the political repression implemented by Louis-Philippe under the leadership of Adolphe Thiers, Minister of the Interior, and ended the hopes raised by the July Revolution. Lodges were under police surveillance and Freemasonry, fearful of being assimilated into a political secret society, was somnolent. A minority of members attempted to democratize its operations.

The Grand Orient de France was managed by prudent members who aimed to protect Masonic lodges, generally monitored by local authorities, and risk trouble if the subjects discussed were openly political or religious. The Grand Lodge's leading figures are philanthropist Horace Bertrand and lawyer Marie-Auguste Desanlis. What they had in common was that they were political opportunists. Grand lodge deputies held legislative power at the convent, and the administrative chambers of the upper workshops acted as the Masonic senate. Representatives of the governing bodies are mainly Parisian so they could attend the many administrative activities. The Suprême Conseil de France was run by older, more monarchist members of the Order, under the leadership of the liberal Duc Decazes, and accommodated a few avant-garde and activist lodges.

In the 1840s, protest grew within the Grand Orient de France, for several reasons. The first, in addition to disaffection with the regime in Masonic circles, was the weakness of grand lodge recruitment. Since the Restoration, the growing number of workers, craftsmen, shopkeepers, and other employees, who were more sensitive to republican ideas, worried the censorious bourgeoisie, who had no wish to fraternize with these populations nicknamed “the blouses”. The permanent commission was proposed in 1847 to avoid “the invasion of profane passions” and increase capitations and the cost of initiations. The second cause was the great centralization of Masonic powers in Paris. Lodges in the provinces, ignoring the general regulations, organized regional congresses where projects to reform Freemasonry or combat impoverishment were debated. The third is clearly more political. Freemasons see in the motto of the Republic - Liberté, Égalité, Fraternité - as an ideal that invites its members to study social issues and debate to bring people together. In their view, Freemasonry should be philosophical, philanthropic, and progressive, and not content with conviviality and morality, should push the institution in an anti-governmental direction.

Certain grand lodge activities were condemned or banned. In 1840, for example, the “Friends of French Honor” lodge was ordered to remove a debate entitled “Is belief in God indispensable, in the moral order, to the social institution?” from its meeting agenda, and the “Friendship” grand lodge was temporarily closed following a grand lodge debate on “the best means to employ in the organization of work”. In the provinces, grand lodges organized courses for the working classes or helped the most destitute by distributing food or firewood. In 1847, Marshal Soult attempted to ban military personnel from joining the grand lodge, particularly non-commissioned officers who were more receptive to revolutionary ideas.

=== Masonic Republic ===
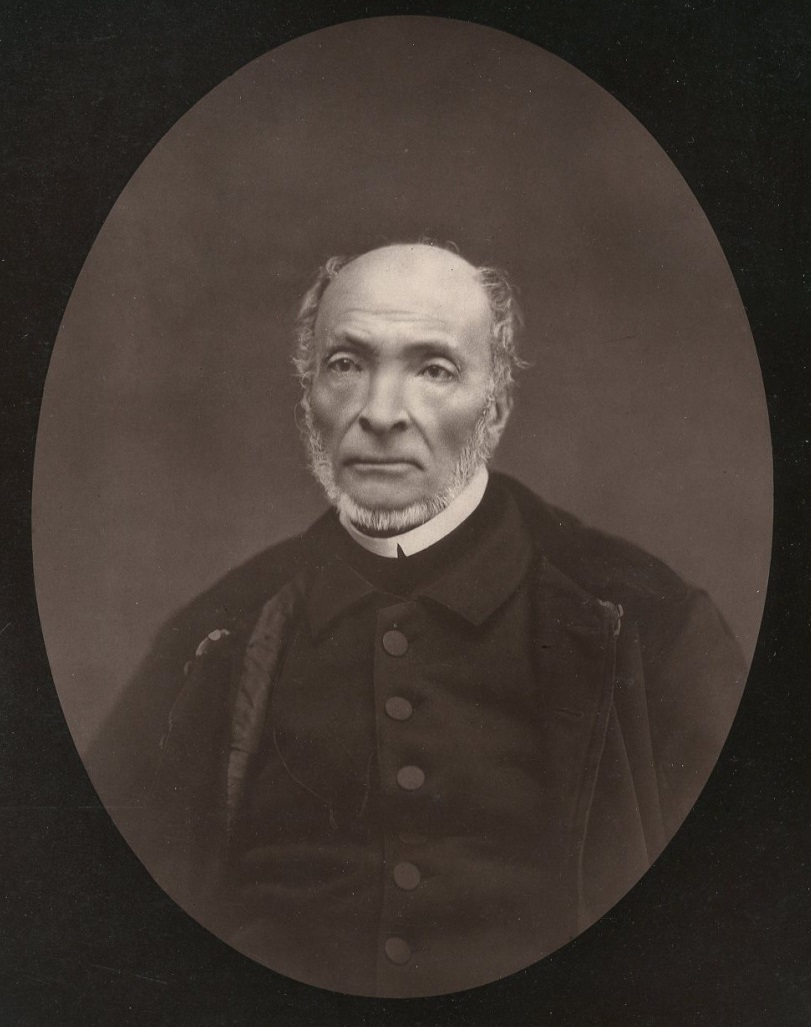
Victor Schœlcher

In response to the ban on political meetings, the Orleanist left and Republicans, including several dozen Freemasons, organized banquets in 28 départements. The one in Paris, scheduled for February 22, 1848, was banned. Armand Marrast incited the population to demonstrate. The shootings on March 23 triggered the insurrection that led to the fall of the July monarchy. On the same day, a provisional republican government was established, the monarchy was abolished and Alphonse de Lamartine proclaimed the Second Republic. The provisional government included five Freemasons, and several of the Republic's commissioners were also members of Freemasonry. The provisional government adopted measures that were part of the wishes expressed by Masonic Grand Lodge, the most emblematic being the abolition of slavery, championed by two Freemasons, Victor Schœlcher and Cyrille Bissette. Masonic-inspired measures were taken by Justice Minister Adolphe Crémieux: the abolition of the death penalty, an end to public exposure of convicts, and constraint by corps in cases of financial debt. The re-establishment of divorce was proposed, but rejected by the deputies to avoid reproaches from the Catholic Church.

An address was delivered by a delegation of representatives of the Grand Orient de France. It assured the provisional government of the support of all its members. Crémieux responded by emphasizing the “Masons' policy of humanity” in the face of party politics. On March 13, a circular, while welcoming the advent of the Republic, asked the grand lodges to work on “the major social issues inherent in the happiness of all”. The majority of French Freemasons were in favor of the advent of the Republic and joined in the popular fervor. In 1848, an osmosis was established between popular aspirations and those of the Freemasons. The funerals of those who died in the revolution were accompanied by grand lodges marching with their banners.

In Paris, Freemasons posted a “Call to Masons” in the city, inviting them on March 14 to set up a Masonic central committee to prepare for elections to the Constituent Assembly. Calling for the advent of a democratic republic, the draft constitution proposed that the country be run by an executive committee elected by the National Assembly, which retained the power to dismiss it. Schools would be free for the poor and compulsory for all, under state supervision. In provincial towns and Paris, Freemasons worked and debated the elections to be held on April 23 and 24. This central committee produced a “declaration of principles of Freemasonry”, which was put forward to Republican candidates; some adopted it as a pledge of their candidacy. The declaration contained avant-garde proposals, many of which were implemented during the Third Republic, in which Freemasonry played an important role. Over a hundred Freemasons were elected to represent the people in the new Assembly, and several were appointed to the new government.

While the Grand Orient fully embraced the new republic and proclaimed its support for it, the Supreme Council of France maintained a cautious attitude to events, since the Order's leaders were all personalities of the July monarchy. The Supreme Council suspended its work the day after the insurrectionary days of February and resumed it only cautiously. However, in March 1848, several dignitaries and holders of high degrees signed an appeal to renovate Freemasonry and put an end to antagonisms with the Grand Orient.

The dream of a “Masonic republic” soon faded. The workers' riots of June 23 and 26, triggered by the closure of the national workshops, saw Eugène Cavaignac's new government implement a crackdown on the press and clubs. Initially, Freemasonry was relatively spared, the Grand Orient having taken the precaution of inviting its members and grand lodges to exercise caution to maintain calm within Grand Lodge. While Freemasons were present on both sides of the barricades, the majority remained silent and attentive, or even absent from the events. André Dupin, an Orleanist deputy and Freemason, proposed a law banning secret societies and clubs. This was discussed and passed in July 1848. The question of including Freemasonry in this law was raised. After convoluted debates, Freemasonry was not affected by the application of the text.

Paris was under siege at the end of the riots, and grand lodge activities were suspended. Only one Freemason remained in government, the Minister of Justice Eugène Bethmont. The Prefect of Paris granted the grand lodges permission to resume their meetings in September 1848.

=== Bonapartism ===
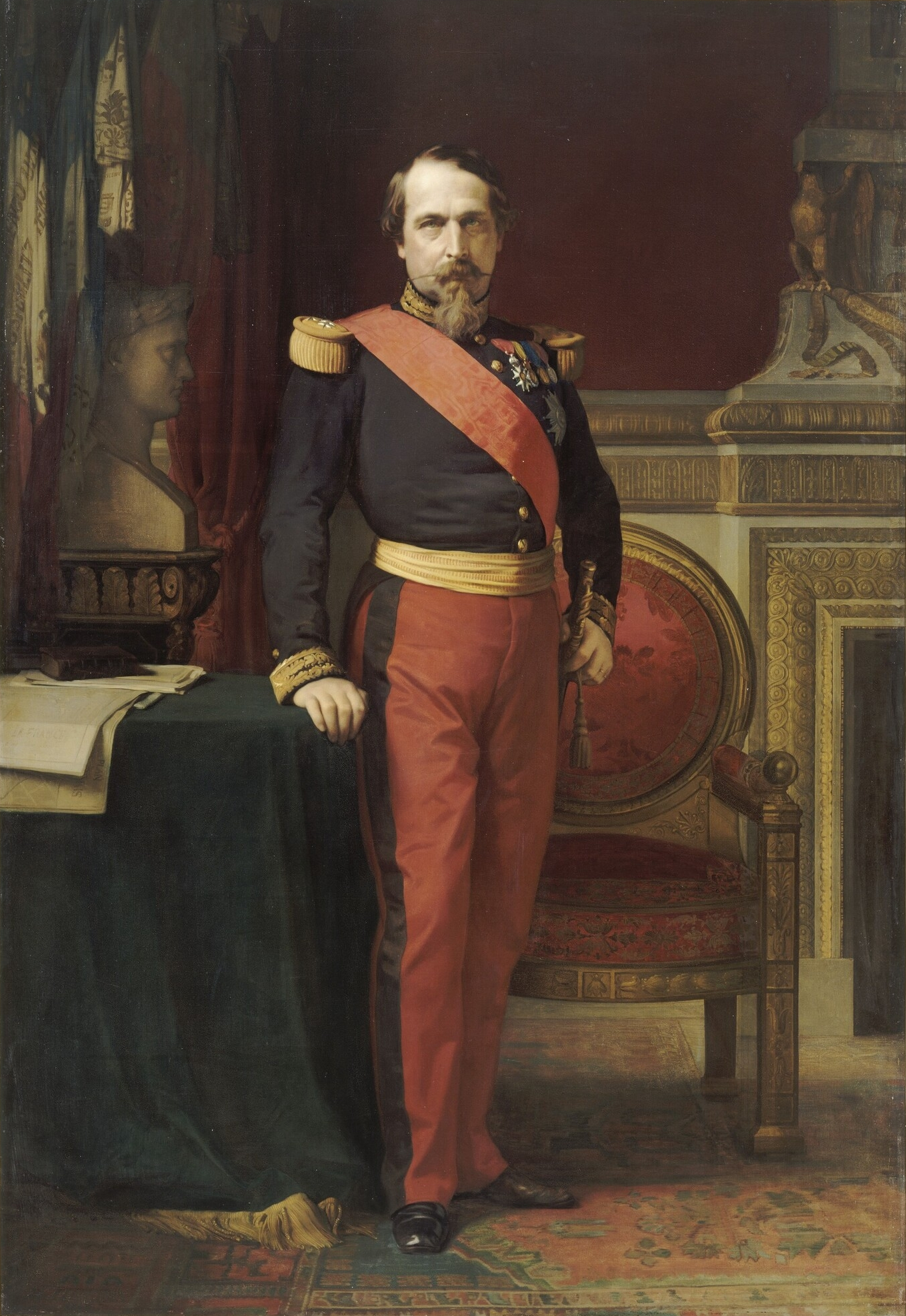
Napoléon III by Jean Hippolyte Flandrin

A schism occurred within France's second-largest Masonic organization, the Suprême Conseil de France (SCDF). A manifesto reflecting the aspirations of Freemasons seeking unification was circulated, with rather revolutionary proposals. These included the recasting of all rites in a national rite, the end of recognition of high grades, the end of rivalries between lodges, the representation of three deputies per grand lodge, and the formation of an assembly, to be known as the "Grande Loge Nationale."

The “dissidents” of the Scottish Rite expressed their proposals publicly. The manifesto is harsh on all dignitaries of all orders, without distinction. In June 1848, the SCDF rejected the project and expelled several members and grand lodges. The excluded did not give up: with a small number of grand lodges, they formed the Grande Loge nationale, which was staffed by officers chosen mainly from the ranks of artisans and proletarians.

In December 1848, Prince Louis Napoléon Bonaparte was elected President of the Republic. His supporters, with the help of Freemasons to his victory, led people to believe that he was a member of the Masonic order and urged the workshops to vote for him. The other candidates reacted virulently. The elected Louis Napoléon politely refused an invitation from the GODF to be initiated into Freemasonry. The coalition of right-wing parties won the legislative elections, the successive governments no longer included any Freemasons, and the Republicans were thrown into opposition. Demonstrations against the re-establishment of papal authority and the ensuing repression, the passing of the Falloux law, the application of restrictions on universal suffrage and multiple trials against secret societies established a republic far removed from both republican and masonic ideals.

On August 10, 1849, under pressure from its members and in an attempt to unify French Freemasonry in its turn, the GODF amended its texts and, after debate, included the motto of the Republic, Liberté, Égalité, Fraternité, in Article 1 of its nascent constitution. (Note: Before this date, the GODF was governed only by a set of general regulations, which were not based on any constitution.) It added his belief in God and the concept of the immortality of the soul served as the intangible foundation of Freemasonry. While French Freemasonry gradually moved towards political action, it retained its spiritual and religious references in the face of growing anti-clericalism. Advocates of spiritualist socialism, such as Pierre Leroux, denounced what they saw as the Catholic Church's hijacking of the Christian message - originally aimed at the deliverance of peoples - to make it “the banner of the most frightening absolutism”. However, this addition was criticized as a concession to the Conservatives and Catholics who had won the May 1849 elections by a wide margin. While the debates revealed that the Order's members adhered to a deist conception of Freemasonry, this spiritualist affirmation of the Grand Orient generated sometimes severe dissension in the workshops, a dissension that foreshadowed the debates around freedom of conscience that would lead, in 1877, to the end of the obligation of all religious beliefs in its constitution.

In October 1850, a circular issued by the Minister of the Interior provided guidance to prefects on how to respond to perceived "red" grand lodges making "demagogic" speeches. The circular granted the prefects the authority to temporarily close the lodge, pending referral to the relevant authorities, who would then be responsible for determining whether to suspend or demolish the grand lodge. In 1850 and 1851, several grand lodges of both the Grand Orient and the Supreme Council were closed in this manner, under the scrutiny of the prefects, who were regarded with suspicion.

Grand lodges not belonging to the GODF or SCDF were considered secret societies. The activism of the new Grande Loge Nationale led to the closure of all its grand lodges and its dissolution in 1851. Although this short-lived Grande Loge Nationale left few traces in the history of French Freemasonry, it was in its encounter with the government - the only notable fact of its brief existence - that a Masonic legend took root, thanks to the poetic eloquence of Alphonse de Lamartine: that of a French Freemasonry that had been the bearer of the Republican motto and the ideals of the French Revolution since its creation. A romantic legend rather than a historical fact, (Note: Historians are quick to point out the legendary nature of this belief.) but one that the Masonic imagination willingly allowed itself to be lulled into complacency for many years.

=== Under the tutelage of the Second Empire ===
The coup d'état of December 2, 1851, ended the Second Republic. Many Freemasons opposed the coup and fell victim to the ensuing repression. Some chose exile in London, where the Grand lodges “Les Philadelphes”, “Les Proscrits” and “Les Gymnosophistes” organized their welcome, including Louis Blanc, Martin Nadaud, Pierre Leroux and Colonel Charras. Other Freemasons, who were opposed to the July monarchy and saw in the Second Republic the beginning of an era of justice and fraternity, experienced great disappointment led some of them to support the new regime.

Louis Napoleon Bonaparte chose not to worry French Freemasonry. Following the example of the First Empire and Napoleon I, he placed it under tutelage. In January 1852, the Grand Orient de France submitted to the soon-to-be imperial authority and elected Prince Lucien Murat, cousin of the future Napoleon III, as Grand Master.

== See also ==
- Freemasonry under the Second French Empire
- Freemasonry in France
- French Second Republic
- Grande Loge Nationale Française

== Bibliography ==
- Chevallier, Pierre (1974). Histoire de la franc-maçonnerie française: La maçonnerie: missionnaire du libéralisme « IV. La victoire momentanée du spiritualisme sous la IIe République ». Les Grandes études historiques. Vol. 2. Librairie Arthème Fayard. ISBN 2-213-00082-4.
- Combes, André (2008). "La Maçonnerie sous la IIᵉ République (1848-1852): de l'illusion lyrique à la tentation bonapartiste". La Chaîne d'Union (3): 12–23. doi:10.3917/cdu.045.0012.
- Hyvert-Messeca, Yves (2014). L'Europe sous l'acacia: Histoire de la franc-maçonnerie européenne du XVIIIe siècle à nos jours XIXe siècle «16: Espoirs, mutation et malheurs de la franc-maçonnerie sous la IIe république. L'univers maçonnique. Vol. 2. Éditions Dervy. ISBN 979-10-242-0023-1.
- Dachez, Roger (2020). Histoire de la franc-maçonnerie française. Que sais-je?. Paris: PUF. doi:10.3917/puf.dache.2020.01. ISBN 9-78-2-715404-403.
