= Jean Bossu (historian) =

Jean Bossu (16 March 1911 - 23 September 1985) was a French libertarian journalist and historian.

He wrote several general works on freemasonry, biographies of revolutionary figures and reflections on society. He took part in the work on the Dictionnaire biographique du mouvement ouvrier français and published a three-volume Chronique des rues d'Épinal.

Throughout his life he wrote the longest file on French Freemasons, including around 130,000 entries. On his death he left this "Bossu file" to the bibliothèque nationale de France - it was numbered over the course of the 20th century and allows contemporary historians to confirm that several 18th and 19th century people were freemasons.

== Life ==
Born in Reims, he was a son of a Public Prosecutor, Louis Bossu (1857–1929) and his wife Marie Way (1878-1954), a composer for piano and violin.

As a libertarian journalist, he collaborated on the individualist anarchist newspaper L’Idée libre both before and after the Second World War. He wrote a short book on Mikhail Bakunin, Dix années de sa vie, published around 1930 by éditions de l'Idée Libre. He collaborated on the Encyclopédie anarchiste begun by Sébastien Faure, 1925-1934, notably writing the articles on Witches' Sabbath and witchcraft.

During the Second World War he was mobilised into the air force and wrote a newspaper for it, Rase-motte. In 1946, in Paris, he collaborated on L’Homme et la vie under the title "organ of the movement of cultural synthesis", edited by the individualist anarchist antimilitarist Manuel Devaldès. He revived the Société d'histoire de la Révolution de 1848. He was initiated as a freemason in 1961 in the "Europe unie" lodge of the Grande Loge nationale française. He was one of the founders of Jean Baylot lodge (no. 190).

He was made a knight of the Ordre national du Mérite in 1983. He died in Épinal, unmarried and childless. He is buried at the chapel of Notre-Dame de la Compassion in Jainvillotte beside his parents and left that chapel and his lordly house to that town. He also left his personal archive to the archives départementales des Vosges as the "cote 42 J".

== Bibliography (in French) ==
- Ronsin, Albert (1990). « Jean Bossu », in Les Vosgiens célèbres. Dictionnaire biographique illustré (in French). Vagney: Éditions Gérard Louis. ISBN 2-907016-09-1..
- Francis Delon, « Sur les traces de Jean Bossu (1911-1985) : un cherchant en quête d’authenticité », Renaissance Traditionnelle, no 167, July 2012, p. 179-193
- Centre International de Recherches sur l'Anarchisme (Lausanne) : notice bibliographique.
- Fédération internationale des centres d'études et de documentation libertaires : notices bibliographiques.
- The "Bossu file"
