= Grand Orient de France =

Largest and oldest Masonic organization in France

- Seal of the Grand Orient de France
- Established: 1728 (as Grand Lodge of France); 24 June 1773; 253 years ago (as Grand Orient de France)
- Location: France
- Region served: France
- Website: godf.org

The Grand Orient de France (French pronunciation: [ɡʁɑ̃t‿ɔʁjɑ̃ də fʁɑ̃s], abbr. GODF) is the oldest and largest of several Freemasonic organizations based in France and is the oldest in Continental Europe (as it was formed out of an older Grand Lodge of France in 1773, and briefly absorbed the rump of the older body in 1799, allowing it to date its foundation to 1728 or 1733). The Grand Orient de France is generally regarded as the "mother lodge" of Continental Freemasonry.

== History ==
=== Foundation ===
In 1777, the Grand Orient de France recognised the antiquity of the Lodge of Perfect Equality, said to have been formed in 1688. This, if it actually existed at that time, was a military lodge attached to the Earl of Granard's Royal Irish Regiment, formed by Charles II of England in Saint-Germain in 1661, just before his return to England. The regiment remained loyal to the Stuarts, and did not return to France until after the fall of Limerick in 1689. They returned to barracks in Saint-Germain in 1698, surviving to become the 92nd Infantry Regiment after the revolution. With these dates in mind, modern scholars usually regard the 1688 lodge as a folk tale.

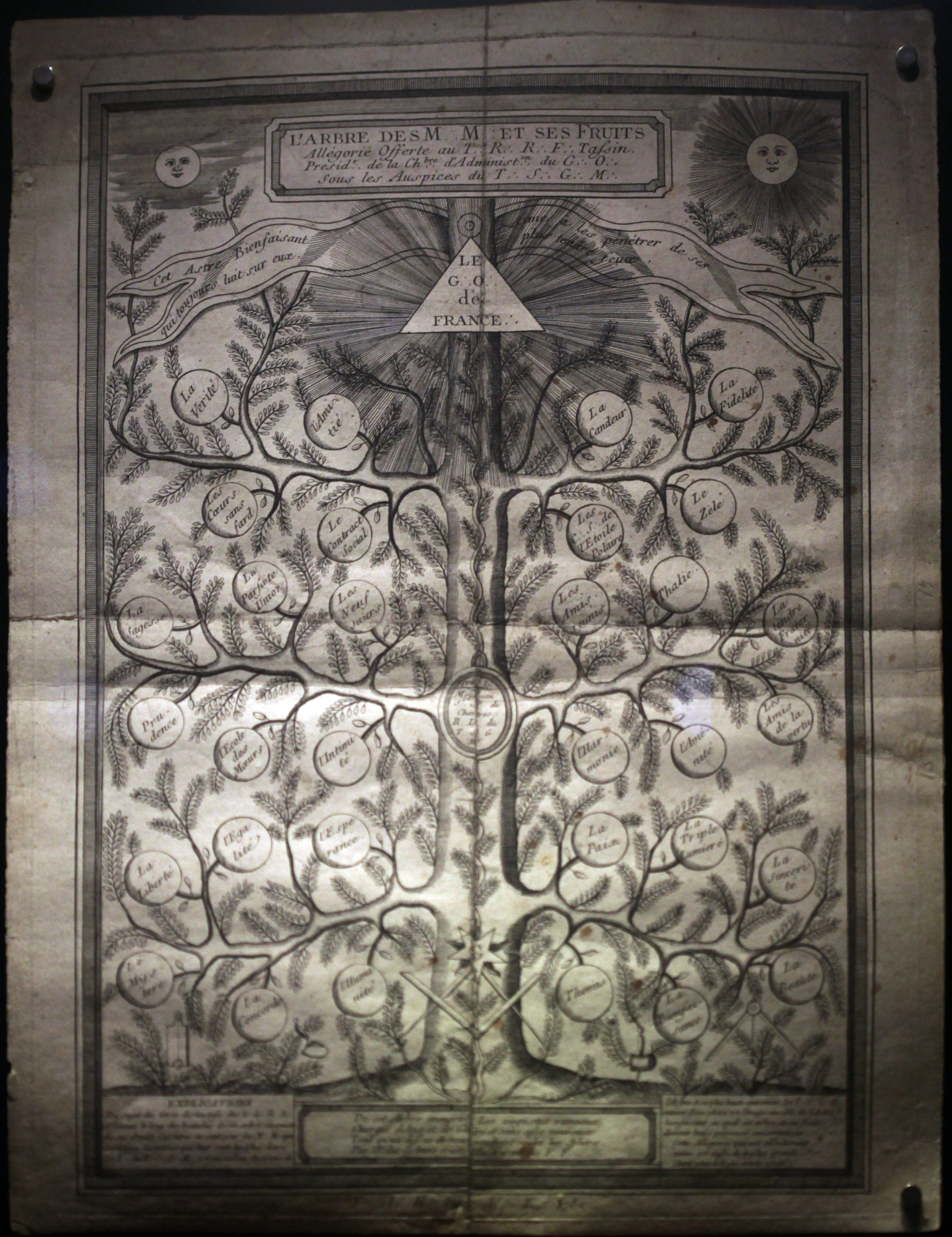
The Tree of the Grand Orient, allegoric engraving of the Grand Orient de France as the centre of French Masonic organizations.

An English Lodge is also said to have been founded at Dunkirk in 1721. Since that year, the English lodges were ruled by nobles belonging to the English Freemasonry nobles, who kept the contacts with the Royal House of the United Kingdom. Another "first Lodge" was organised by exiled Jacobites under the Earl of Derwentwater in Paris about 1725. A lodge was documented at the Louis d'Argent in the Rue des Boucheries, Paris, in 1732. These lodges were then independent of each other, each body recognizing no other authority than their owner. There was also a French lodge listed in the 1723 minutes of the Premier Grand Lodge of England. Meeting at Solomon's Temple, in Hemmings Row (then off St. Martin's Lane in London) the Master was Jean Theophile Desaguliers, then Deputy Grand Master and effective governor of the craft in England. In a list of members, mostly having French names, James Anderson, who compiled the first printed constitutions, is listed as "Jaques Anderson maitre et arts".

The first "deputisations" of lodges in France by the London Grand Lodge occurred in 1732, and the Grand Orient now dates its foundation from 1733, when there started to be a recognisable Grand Lodge of France. It was in 1743 that the English Grand Lodge of France became a French phenomenon, with Louis, Count of Clermont becoming Grand Master until his death in 1771. Shortly after his death, a schism occurred, with the larger party becoming what Louis-Philippe d'Orléans, Duke of Chartres, renamed the Grand Orient de France in 1773. The ritual of the new Grand Lodge followed that of the Premier Grand Lodge of England.

By the time of the French Revolution, there were some 1250 Masonic Lodges in the country.

=== French Revolution ===
The Lodge Les Neuf Sœurs was a prominent lodge attached to the Grand Orient de France that was particularly influential in organising French support for the American Revolution (1765–1783) and later in the intellectual ferment that preceded the French Revolution (1789). Benjamin Franklin was a member of this Lodge when he was serving as liaison in Paris.

Some notable French revolutionaries were Freemasons, including Marquis de Lafayette, Marquis de Condorcet, Mirabeau, Georges Danton, the Duke of Orléans, and Hébert.

Louis Philippe II, Duke of Orléans, a leader of the Liberal Aristocracy, was the Grand Master of the Grand Orient at the time of the French Revolution. In some parts of France, the Jacobin Clubs were continuances of Masonic lodges from the Ancien Régime, and according to historian Alan Forrest "some early clubs, indeed, took over both the premises and much of the membership of masonic lodges, before rebadging themselves in the new idiom of the revolution." In 1804 it merged with the rival Grand Lodge, the Rite Ecossais.

In 1910, the Catholic Encyclopedia wrote that the Masonic book La Franc-Maçonnerie, écrasée in 1746 predicted the program of the French Revolution, and quoted documents of the Grand Orient of France where Freemasonry claims credit for the French Revolution. The New Catholic Encyclopedia of 1967 (written after the Second Vatican Council) says that modern historians see Freemasonry's role in the French Revolution as exaggerated. The most recent edition (2002) does not contain any article on Freemasonry.

=== Napoleon III ===
In France Napoleon III established a dictatorship over official French Freemasonry, appointing first Prince Lucien Murat and later Marshal Magnan to maintain close supervision over Freemasonry and suppress any hints of opposition to the regime.

=== The Paris Commune ===
According to the Marxist author Ernest Belfort Bax, Freemasons had a considerable involvement in the Paris Commune after a couple of unsuccessful attempts at reconciling the Commune with the French Government.

=== Schism with the United Grand Lodge of England ===
In 1877, at the instigation of the Protestant pastor Frédéric Desmons, it allowed those who had no belief in a supreme being to be admitted. The United Grand Lodge of England (UGLE) and related Lodges regarded belief in the Supreme Being as a Masonic Landmark.

It was this decision that has been the root cause of the schism between the Grand Orient (and those lodges that followed it), and the rest of Freemasonry. It is a schism in Freemasonry which continues to this day. It is argued that the definition is ambiguous, that Anderson's Landmarks are his own collection and interpretation of the historical landmarks, and that changes in both interpretation and practice have occurred before and since.

The decision was not universally approved in France. By 1894 many lodges had split off in protest and formed the Grande Loge de France (GLdF) In 1910, a few members of the Grand Orient, wishing to re-introduce the concept of God the Great Architect, brought back the Rectified Scottish Rite from Switzerland. In the resulting friction with the national body, they amalgamated with the English lodge of Bordeaux to produce, in 1913, a third grand lodge, la Grande Loge Nationale Indépendante et Régulière pour la France et les Colonies françaises, now the Grande Loge Nationale Française.

=== Third Republic ===
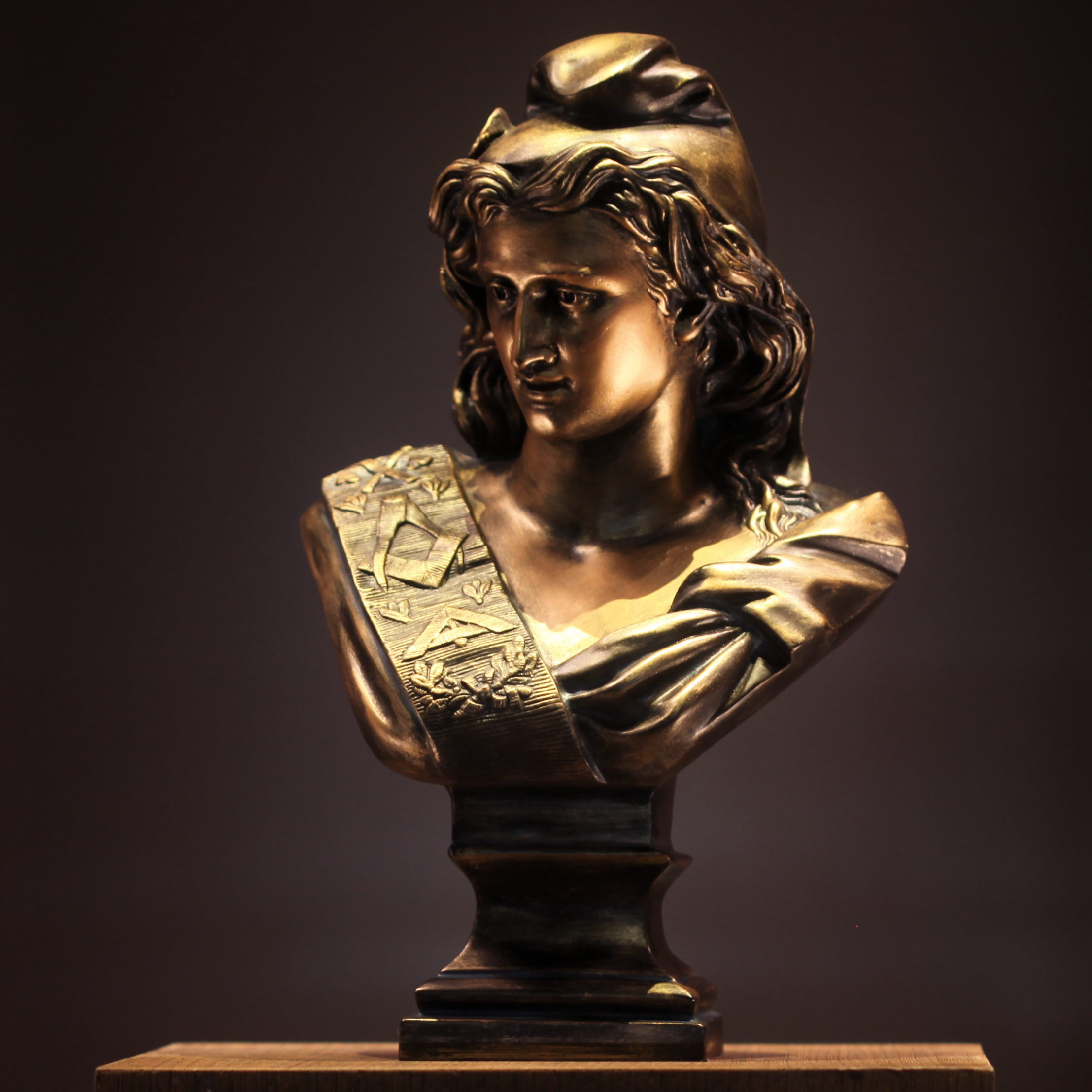
Masonic Marianne, by Paul Lecreux (aka Jacques France). This bust inspired Republican variations of Marianne used during the Third Republic.

The Grand Orient was instrumental in the founding of the left wing Republican Party.

The Grand Orient was implicated in the Affaire des Fiches, where it was accused of collecting and holding information on the religious and political affiliation of army officers, passed on by a member of the government, having been collected with the intention of blocking practicing Catholics and non-Republicans from further advancement.

=== Separation of church and state ===
The Grand Orient of France advanced the principle of laïcité, a French concept of the separation of church and state and the absence of religious interference in government affairs. In the 1930s the Grand Orient was still hostile to the interests of the Catholic Church, wishing to close private schools in France (which were predominantly Roman Catholic), or failing that to reintroduce an insistence that only state schools could provide civil servants.

During the first decade of the 21st century, the Grand Orient de France was concerned about a "silent revolution" of a return of religion in society. It advocated government action against (according to its own terms) an "offensive of cults in Europe". In April 2008, when the legitimacy of the anti-cult ministerial group (MIVILUDES) was questioned, the Grand Master of the Order, Jean-Michel Quillardet, intervened personally with the Speaker of the French Parliament in order to maintain its activity.

==== LGBT rights and religion ====
In 2013, the Grand Orient of France stated its support for the legalization of same-sex marriage in France in a press release condemning the Roman Catholic Archbishop of Paris, André Vingt-Trois, for his public statements against same-sex marriage; in the statement, the GOdF described the bill as one which seeks to "ensure Republican recognition of free marital choice of individuals who wish it, in the name of equal rights". The statement issued by the GOdF continues with a call for organized religions to abstain from interfering in private affairs and restrict their activities to purely spiritual matters, and not to interfere with the democratic process.

== Relationship with other Masonic jurisdictions ==
The Grand Orient of France belongs to the Continental tradition of Freemasonry (known to its practitioners as "Liberal Masonry"), the defining features of which are complete freedom of religious conscience and deliberate involvement in politics. This is antithetical to the "Anglo-American" tradition of Freemasonry, which remains male only and requires a belief in Deity but which otherwise bans discussion of both religion and politics. This difference affects which other Grand Jurisdictions give GODF "recognition" and deem it "regular". Those Grand Lodges and Grand Orients that follow the Continental tradition tend to recognize the authority of the GODF, while those that follow the Anglo-American tradition do not.

=== Politics and religion ===
Unlike Anglo-American Freemasonry, the Grand Orient of France does not require candidates for membership to believe in a Supreme Being, and allows the discussion of political issues and religion in lodge. It upholds a series of guiding principles or ideals (valeurs), which individual members are expected to defend, and which the Grand Orient as a corporate body promotes.

- Democracy - The Grand Orient is committed to the ideals of the Republic.
- Laicity - The church should restrict its pronouncements to the purely spiritual, and should under no circumstances be allowed to influence the law.
- Social Solidarity - The state must make provisions for the economically disadvantaged.
- Citizenship - Liberty, equality and fraternity promoted through respect, tolerance and freedom of conscience.
- Environment - Humanity has the responsibility to protect the environment for future generations.
- Human Dignity - All humankind should be guaranteed food, shelter and care.
- Human Rights - As defined in the 1948 Universal Declaration of Human Rights.

In discussions at all levels, up to and including the President, the Grand Orient claims to exert a beneficent influence on the French Government.

=== Female membership ===
When the Grand Orient of France took shape in 1773, it inherited several Lodges of Adoption attached to its own lodges. These were open to masons and admitted their female relatives in their own set of rituals. They received an implied seal of approval when the Duc de Chartres, then Grand Master of France, became "Grand Master" of a new lodge of adoption in Paris, with the Duchess of Bourbon as "Grand Mistress". Briefly eclipsed by the revolution, they again became fashionable under Napoleon, before being declared unconstitutional in 1808. They were revived in 1901 as a women's society, before a final separation in 1935. The resulting organisation is now the Grande Loge féminine de France.

For many years, the Grand Orient would not allow its lodges to initiate women, but did recognize and receive women who were made Freemasons in other jurisdictions. This changed in 2010, and after some setbacks, the Grand Orient currently allows the initiation of women.

== GODF lodges outside France ==
The Grand Orient of France currently has direct jurisdiction over the following individual lodges outside France:

=== Mauritius ===
- La Triple Espérance (1778), Port Louis
- Louis Lechelle, Port Louis
- Seewoosagur Ramgoolam, Port Louis
- Pilier du Temps, Port Mathurin
- Themistoclea (2011), Port Louis
- Fraternity Lodge, Port Louis (suspended April to October 2023)
- Sia, Port Louis
- Lumière de Sirius, Port Louis
- Grande Loja Unida do Paraná

=== Canada ===
- Le Lys et La Rose, Montréal (Québec) (1999)

=== Georgia ===
- La Rose et la Vigne, Tbilisi (2023)

=== the Netherlands ===
- Loge Saint Napoléon, Amsterdam (1810/2017)

=== North Macedonia ===
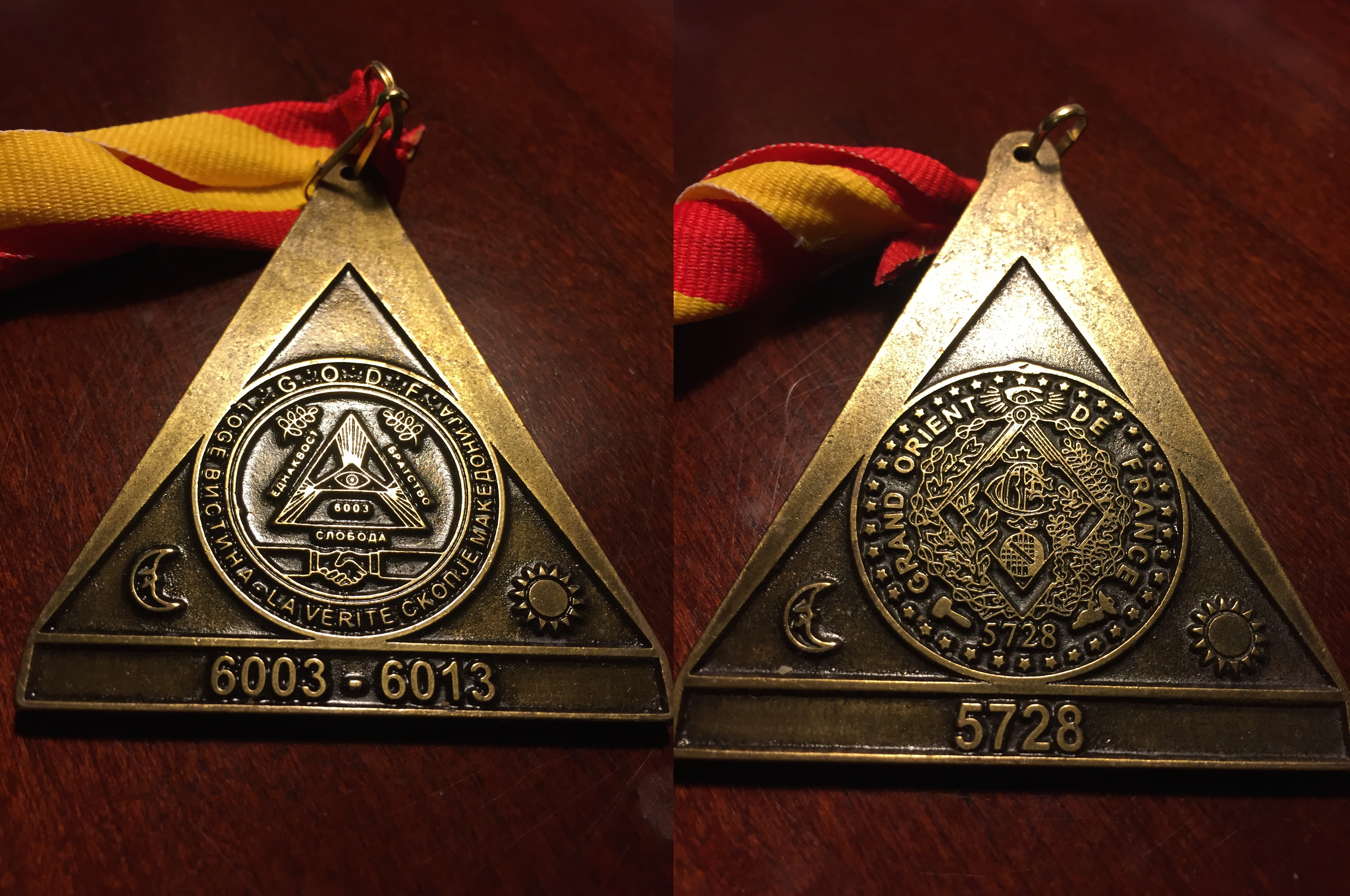
A masonic medallion issued by the Masonic Lodge "Vistina - La Verite" in Skopje, the Republic of North Macedonia. The lodge is under the jurisdiction of the Grand Orient of France. Website: https://vistina.org.mk/

- Vistina - La Verite, Skopje (North Macedonia)
  (2003)

=== Russia ===
- Moscow Lodge #6018, Moscow (Russia) (1998)
- Astrea Lodge #6032, Sankt-Peterburg (Russia) (2013)
- Svoboda Lodge #6046, Moscow (Russia) (2022)
- Belaya Akacia Lodge #6048, Sankt-Peterburg (Russia) (2022)

=== Serbia ===
- Duh Tesle (The Spirit of Tesla) 2017, Belgrade
- Dositej Lodge, Serbia (2008)
- Harmonija (Harmony) Lodge, Serbia (2008)
- Ivanjski Venac (Ivan's Chaplet) Lodge, Serbia (2008)
- Panonija, Novi Sad, Serbia (2008)
- Pobratim (Blood Brother) Lodge, Serbia (2008)
- Sava Popovich Tekelija, Serbia
- Sveti Sava (Saint Sava) Lodge, Serbia (2008)
- Ujedinjenje (Union), Belgrade, Serbia, (2006)
- Vernost (Fidelity), Belgrade, Serbia (2002)
- Zora (Dawn), Belgrade, Serbia (1993)
- Viminacium, Požarevac, Srbija (2019)

=== Spain ===
- Antanor (Triangle), Altea (2019*)
- Blasco Ibañez, Valencia (1999)
- Cierzo (Triangle), Zaragoza (2016*)
- Constante Alona, Alicante (2002)
- Heracles, Málaga (2007)
- Hércules (Triangle), Ceuta (2017*)
- Luz Atlántica, Canarias (2003)
- Luz de Levante, Múrcia (2008)
- Mare Nostrum, Barcelona (2009)
- Pitágoras, Málaga (2013)
- Rosario de Acuña, Gijón (2004)
- Siete de Abril, Madrid (2006)
- Tartessos, Sevilla (2010)
- W. A. Mozart, Madrid (2004)

*Foundation date as Triangle, it is not yet a lodge.

=== United Kingdom ===
- Freedom of Conscience, London (UK) English speaking Lodge (2010)
- Hiram Lodge, London (1899)

=== United States ===
- Art et Lumière Lodge, Los Angeles - CA (1990)
- Atlantide Lodge, New York City - NY (1900)
- Lafayette Lodge no. 89, Washington - D.C. (1989)
- Pacifica Lodge, San Francisco-CA (1986)
- L'Hermione 1780 Lodge, Baltimore - MD (2016)
- Star of the two Worlds, Fort Lauderdale (Florida) - FL (2018)

=== Poland ===
- Gabriel Narutowicz Lodge, Kraków/Cracow (1991)
- Nadzieja Lodge, Warszawa/Warsaw (2021)
- Braterstwo nad Olza Lodge, Cieszyn (2021)
- Gwiazda Morza Lodge, Gdansk (2021)

Asia

Sovereign Independent Grand Lodge of the Orient- Philippines

== See also ==
- Grande Loge de France
- Grande Loge Nationale Française
- CLIPSAS
- Le Droit Humain
- Les Neuf Soeurs
- Musée de la Franc-Maçonnerie
- Orders of Wisdom
- Freemasonry under the Second French Empire
- French Freemasonry under the Second Republic
- French Freemasonry during the interwar period
