= Freemasonry under the Second French Empire =

Freemasonry in the French Second Empire

Freemasonry under the Second Empire was founded under the tutelage of Napoleon III's authoritarian Empire. The Second Empire saw Freemasonry and Freemasons as a threat and aimed to either control them or wipe them out. Refusing to submit to imperial rule, some Freemasons chose exile and embarked for England. To survive, the Grand Orient de France, the main Masonic obedience, and French Freemasonry in general - as they had during the revolutionary and First Empire periods - had to accept major concessions. To avoid dissolution, they opted for the "prince's protectors" solution, who were responsible for taking control. The authoritarian period saw the banning of political debate and the fading and downsizing of the lodges, which suffered from low membership levels, before experiencing new dynamics and a new boom during the liberal period of the Second Empire.

During the 1870 war, the obediences did not support imperial policy and tended to be pacifist. After the defeat at Sedan and the proclamation of the Republic, they called for the fight against the Prussian armies and broke off relations with German Freemasonry. In 1871, while the obediences kept their distance from the Paris Commune, some Freemasons openly joined the ranks of the federates, while others called for conciliation to avoid confrontation.

French Freemasonry demonstrated its ability to adapt to the constraints of imperial power. However, it was also fragmented, with conflicts and dissensions between lodges and between obediences, sometimes between generations of Freemasons, which focused on the duration of the often very long presidencies of lodges, or with conflicts of a political nature between republicans and anti-republicans. An anti-clerical current born of the Restoration surely took hold throughout this period. Despite this fragmentation, the flexibility of Masonic institutions and the ability to adapt at national and local levels enabled Freemasonry in France to maintain itself through institutions malleable enough to accommodate all regimes.

French Freemasonry became more openly involved in social debate during this pivotal period. The Grand Orient de France, while remaining an initiatory order, evolved into a philosophical and political society, adopting as its motto the republican triptych - Liberty - Equality - Fraternity, prefiguring its commitment to society and its political action during the Third Republic.

== Masonic landscape ==
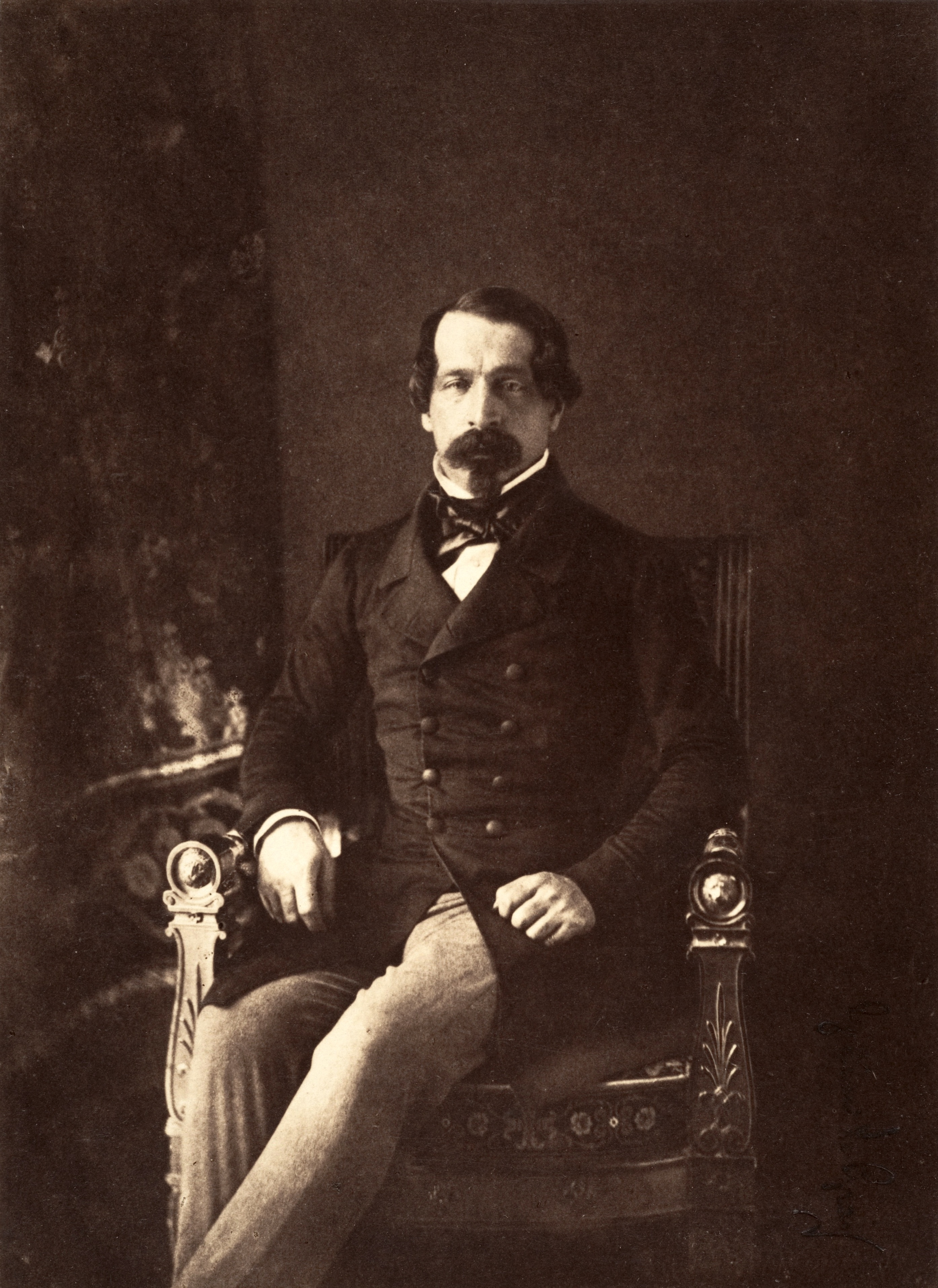
Louis-Napoléon Bonaparte in 1852.

The election of Louis-Napoléon Bonaparte, helped by the victory of the conservative parties on May 13, 1849, propelled many Freemasons into opposition and sometimes underground. The coup d'état of December 2, 1851, silenced the Republicans in the Masonic lodges. The most vindictive members were arrested or deported, while others were outlawed or chose to go into exile in England.

The Grand Orient de France (GODF), France's leading Masonic obedience, was already undergoing a sociological transformation in the years leading up to the coup d'état. New members were often close to positivist currents, joining other members who were Saint-Simonians, followers of Fourierism, or Proudhonians. This mixture of liberal currents and socialist utopia was muzzled during the imperial era but animated a form of republican rebellion within the Masonic order.

Lodges in the provinces were the hardest hit by the new regime; during the years of authoritarian rule, more than half were demolished. (Note: Freemasonry term for closing a lodge) Lodges in Paris were also greatly reduced, although at the same time, lodges close to the government were created, such as those with the evocative names of "Saint Lucien" or "Bonaparte", which brought together the elite and those close to the regime. However, the intermingling of members from diverse backgrounds, with crafts and commerce in the majority, was the seed of a current hostile to the Grand Master and of a tendency to work for the downfall of a "protector" it considered imposed by those in power.

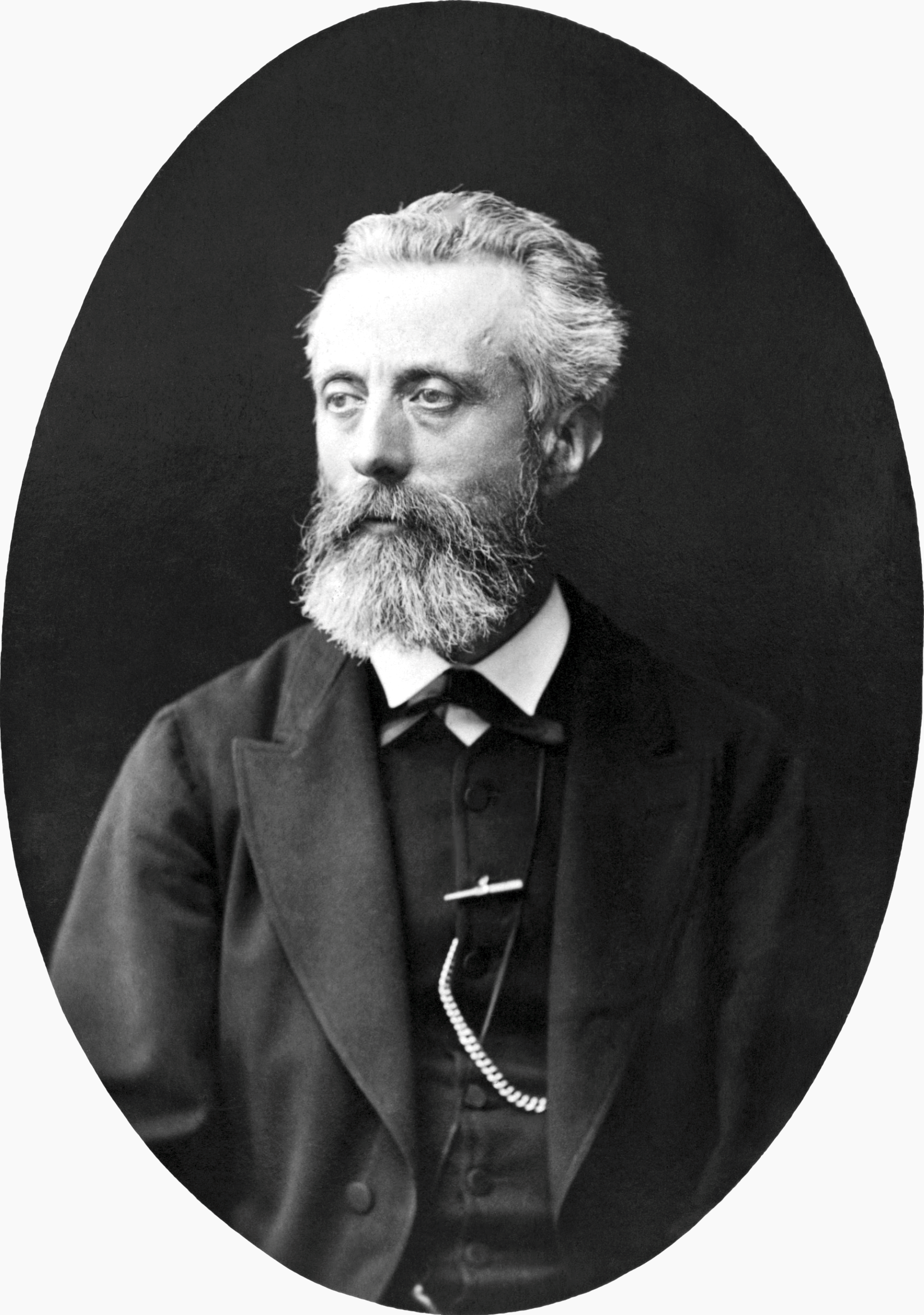
Léon Richer, Freemason and one of the founders of feminism.

The Suprême Conseil de France, France's second-largest obedience, which practices the Ancient and Accepted Scottish Rite, reports a smaller number of lodges; it has very few lodges in the provinces but shares a liberal spirit with the Grand Orient, albeit with a highly hierarchical and less democratic structure. It lost some of its more progressive lodges after abstaining from supporting the Second Republic in 1848. Resisting the injunctions of power during the authoritarian period, these lodges evolved in the same direction as those of the Grand Orient during the liberal period.

The masonic landscape under the Second Empire also revealed a mixed freemasonry that was maintained through a few lodges or initiatives. The Grande Loge d'adoption de l'obédience de Misraïm (Grand Adoption Lodge of the Misraïm obedience) had around thirty members at the start of the Empire and practiced adoption masonry. In addition, Luc-Pierre Richard-Gardon founded the "Temple des familles," a mixed Masonic organization that also practiced a rite of adoption and welcomed several prominent women from the bourgeoisie, often cultured and feminist. Some lodges and Freemasons supported women's membership in Masonic obediences, but these positions were not supported and were subject to rebukes. At the same time, questions about women's rights, particularly within the family, were being debated within the lodges: Freemasons such as Léon Richer, Jules Simon and Eugène Pelletan openly advocated greater rights and improved status for women in society.

Between 1860 and 1870, the Second Empire continued France's colonial expansion, and Masonic lodges followed the settlers. Freemasonry had already been present in Algeria since 1831, with the "Cirnus" and "Bélisaire" lodges in Algiers. They were mainly composed of colonial army officers. The "Bélisaire" lodge had over 120 members in 1860; it expanded several times and set up numerous workshops throughout the country. After the coup d'état in 1852, a dozen lodges had around 900 members. However, the Masonic presence remained marginal, with about a population of two and a half million Algerians and 100,000 Europeans. Between 1852 and 1870, the number of Grand Orient de France lodges in Algeria did not exceed a dozen, and, like the lodges in metropolitan France, they saw the spread of liberal ideas and anticlericalism towards all religions. Morocco and Tunisia also saw the arrival of lodges on their territory from the 1860s, within the same framework and according to the same sociology. As in Algeria, settlers and the military did not make it easy for Muslims and Jews to join Freemasonry.

If French Freemasonry demonstrated a form of adaptability during the imperial period, passing from a Bonapartist Grand Master of the Grand Orient de France, in the person of Lucien Murat in 1852, cousin of the emperor, an authoritarian and religious man, who unhesitatingly demolished several Republican lodges, to the journalist Léonide Babaud-Laribière, elected Grand Master in 1870, an avowed secularist and republican, is mainly due to the political and social evolution of French obediences between 1851 and 1870. Despite this ability to adapt, Freemasonry was also fragmented, with conflicts and dissensions between lodges and between obediences, sometimes between generations of Freemasons who focused on the often very long duration of lodge presidencies under the Second Empire. Another source of conflict was political, between Republicans and anti-republicans, often Bonapartists, conservatives, or, more rarely, monarchists. Despite this fragmentation, the flexibility of the Masonic institution and its ability to adapt at both national and local levels enabled it to maintain itself through institutions that were sufficiently malleable to get through this period while continuing to evolve.

== History of the obediences ==
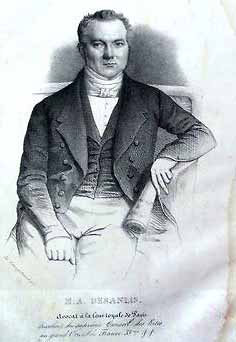
Marie-Auguste Desanlis, Grand Master of the Grand Orient at the advent of the Second Empire.

=== Grand Orient de France ===
With the advent of the Second Empire and Napoleon III on December 2, 1852, the Grand Orient de France was without a Grand Master: Joseph Bonaparte, elected to the post on December 5, 1804, died in 1844 without returning his office, even though the position had been vacant since 1815 when he went into exile. (Note: During the vacancy, Grand Orient leaders bear the title of Deputy Grand Master) An election was nevertheless scheduled for December 1851, following the resignation of Marie-Auguste Desanlis. Esprit-Eugène Hubert, the new secretary of the GODF, was warned by a member of his family, François Certain de Canrobert, that all Masons risked arrest if they gathered for the election. The Prefect of Police sent the GODF an order to suspend Masonic lodge meetings until January 1, 1852. At the same time, an anti-Masonic campaign swept the country. Considered a threat by those in power, Freemasonry was obliged, as in the past, to accept concessions to avoid dissolution. Several dignitaries, including Adolphe Perier, General Secretary and nephew of Casimir Perier, suggested turning to the "prince protector" solution. Agreement was reached on the person of Prince Lucien Murat, initiated in Austria in 1821. (Note: According to Pierre Chevalier in his historical work, which recounts the words of Brother Accary announcing his election.)

=== 1852 - 1862: Prince Murat's great mastery ===
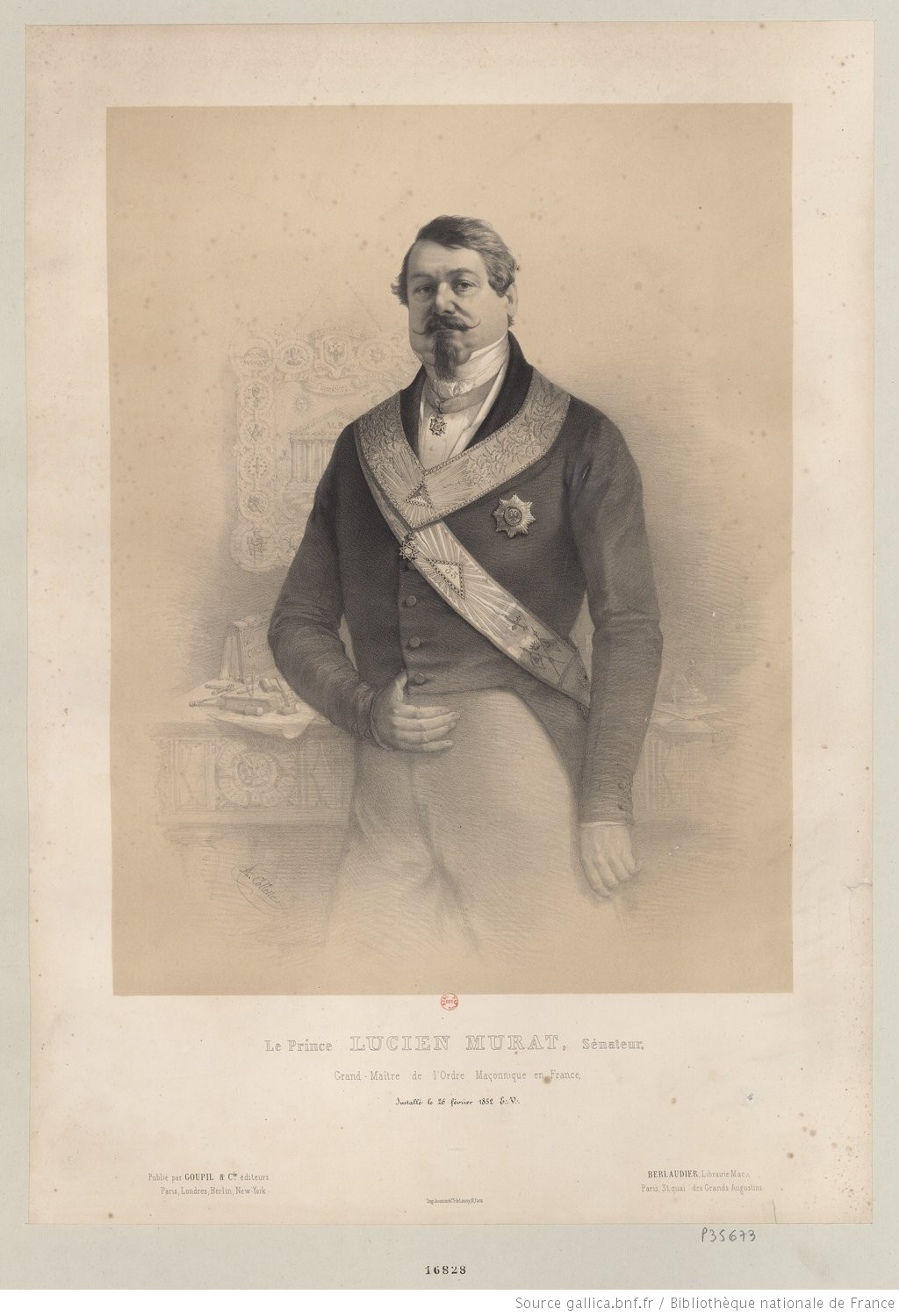
Lucien Murat, Grand Master from 1852 to 1862.

Lucien Murat's election to the Grand Mastership was more sudden than deliberate and was greeted with circumspection by the Freemasons of the Grand Orient de France. The order's council and the Masonic convent of January 9, 1852, approved the choice "unanimously", 27 members opposed to this forced appointment having left the assembly before the vote. On January 23, he was installed Grand Master of the Masonic Order in France; on January 27, he was elevated from the 18th to the 33rd and final degree of the Ancient and Accepted Scottish Rite.

Despite this appointment, around a hundred lodges were suspended in 1852. Lucien Murat's first initiatives were not widely accepted: the dismissal of the much-appreciated secretary Eugène Hubert, the purchase of the Hôtel de Richelieu on rue Cadet in August 1852 for the sum of 450,000 gold francs, which threatened to weigh heavily on the Order's finances, and the confirmation of his authoritarianism prompted many members to maintain the most elementary reserve. In 1853, he took various measures to reinforce his power, and in 1854, a convent endowed the obedience with a "Bonapartist constitution," the first article of which was extensively revised to impose "the existence of God, the immortality of the soul and the love of mankind" as its basis, and granted him vast powers. This functional and dogmatic tutelage led to a drop in the number of lodges: from 327 in 1853, the Grand Orient counted just 167 in 1858. As a consequence of the Grand Master's Caesarism, several dozen Masonic workshops that resisted this submission to the government stopped paying dues and were suspended by the Grand Master's council.

Lucien Murat created a dogmatic institute in 1856 to take control of the Masonic high ranks before being appointed Grand Commander, continuing to draw opposition to him. Successive convents were the object of conflict between the executive and disgruntled members of the order. In 1860, the Grand Orient's growing mistrust of him was accompanied by the convents' rejection of many of his proposals: his proposal to set up a mutual aid society, seen as an attempt to transform the purpose of the Grand Orient, was widely rejected. As a senator, Lucien Murat supported and voted in favor of maintaining the presence of French troops in the papal city amid Italy's attempts at unification. In total contradiction with his status as a Freemason, he supported the proposal of the ultramontanes and Catholic clergy, who were opposed to Freemasonry. From then on, criticism of him was publicly voiced, mainly by Luc-Pierre Richard-Gardon. In the May/June 1861 issue of L'Initiation ancienne et moderne, Richard-Gardon asserted that Prince Murat could not hold two opposing views, given that in Rome he supported a power that persecuted Freemasons, while in France, he asserted himself as a protector of Freemasons. The Grand Master's reaction was swift: the journal was temporarily suspended.

The crisis became inevitable as Lucien Murat stood for re-election as Grand Master in 1861: supporters and opponents clashed, first through communications in the Lodges and then at the 1861 Convent. Subsequently, a campaign developed within the Lodges to promote the election of Prince Napoléon-Jérôme, who had violently opposed the proposal to maintain troops in Italy. On May 21, a meeting of delegates at the Hôtel rue Cadet elected Prince Napoléon by 98 delegates out of 152. On May 23, the Prefect Symphorien Boittelle issued a decree halting the process and forbidding Freemasons to meet to elect a Grand Master before the end of October. The unrest surrounding this election caused Prince Napoleon to withdraw. Negotiations to reconcile the two camps failed, and the Order found itself on the brink of collapse. Faced with the impasse and the lack of agreement, the authorities decided to settle the matter. The Emperor requested Lucien Murat's resignation and signed a decree on January 11, 1862, appointing Marshal Bernard Pierre Magnan "Grand Master of the Masonic Order of France," putting an end for a time to the deep crisis shaking French Masonry.

=== 1862 - 1865: Marshal Magnan's great mastery ===
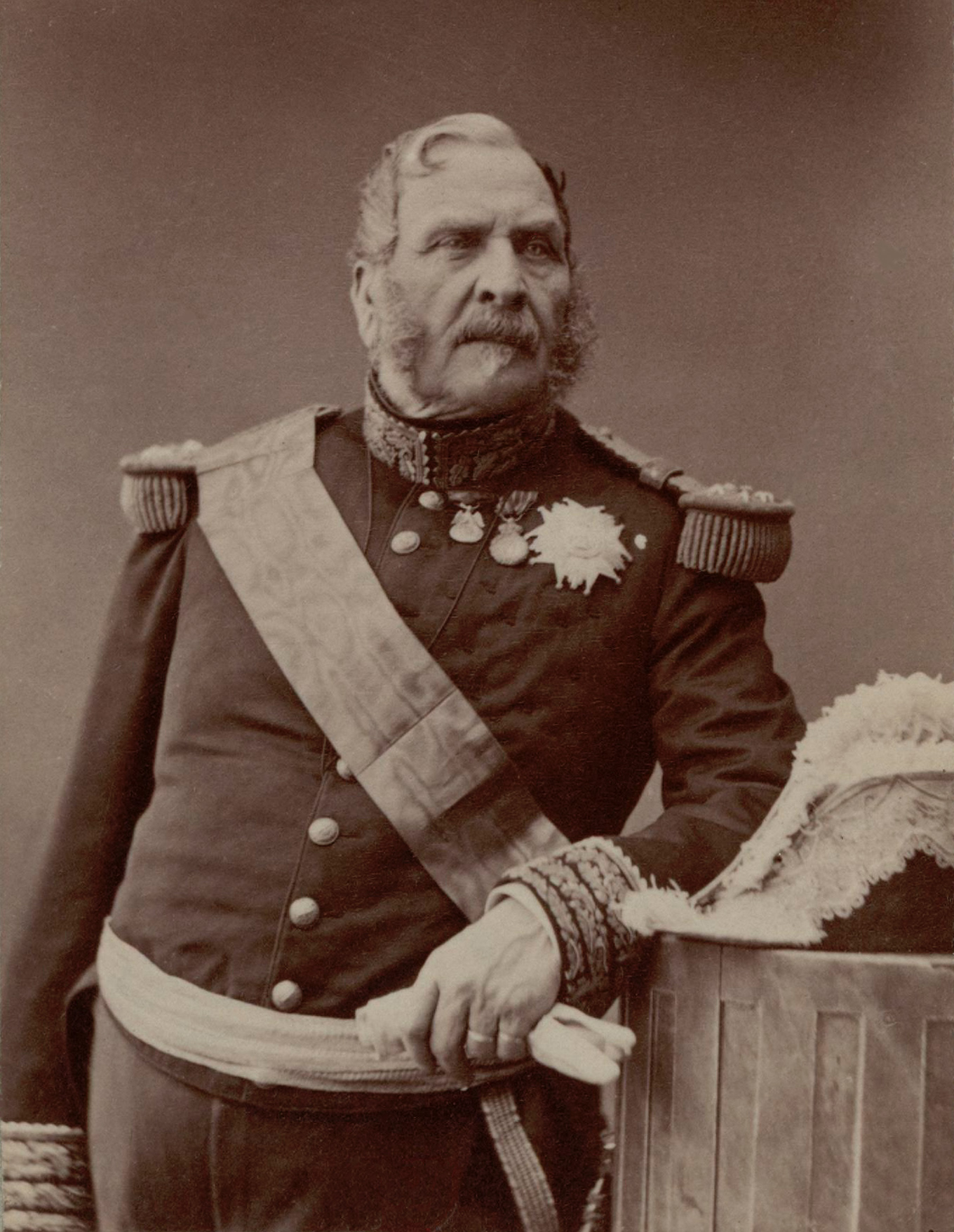
Bernard Pierre Magnan, Grand Master from 1862 to 1865.

Marshal Bernard Pierre Magnan, a career military officer, found himself at the head of a Grand Orient de France that was in no position to oppose this imperial decision. His appointment presented a unique problem in the history of the Grand Orient: Marshal Magnan was not a Freemason at the time of his appointment on January 11, 1862. Appointed for three years, he was initiated on February 6, 1862, and received the 33 grades of the Ancient and Accepted Scottish Rite on the same day. Almost all the workshops accepted the facts without resistance; only two lodges objected to this un-Masonic procedure. Despite his soldierly past, Marshal Magnan was not inclined to be lenient, and he won the sympathy of some of the Grand Orient's Freemasons by quickly reversing almost all of his predecessor's decisions. However, the appointment of a military officer to head the obedience was a sign of the imperial power's desire to maintain control over Freemasonry. The paternal attitude of the new Grand Master (Note: When he was appointed Grand Master, he was over 70 years old.) was not enough to appease the leaders of Prince Murat's protest. The Grand Orient nevertheless experienced a revival in the creation of lodges, increasing from 190 in 1862 to 230 in 1865. Marshal Magnan then decided to implement several reforms, some without much success.

His first failure was to unify French Masonic obediences, which were ordered to recognize his authority and join the Grand Orient de France. The small obedience of Jean Étienne Marconis de Nègre and his four "Egyptian lodges" of the Memphis Rite complied. On the other hand, the Supreme Council of France and its 50 lodges, presided over by Jean-Pons-Guillaume Viennet, strongly opposed this forced integration. When he took over as head of the Supreme Council, Guillaume Viennet inherited, at the age of 87, an obedience in good working order, which had kept out of the Grand Orient's quarrels with the imperial power, showed great respect for the authorities and was mainly active in philanthropic actions. On February 1, 1862, the Grand Master ordered the lodges of the Supreme Council to merge into the Grand Orient. Grand Commander Viennet's negative response was swift and straightforward: in a detailed letter, he confirmed the impossibility of submitting to this order, arguing that the two obediences were distinct and that Magnan's appointment as head of the Grand Orient had no effect on the Supreme Council, whose powers he held as legatee of an illustrious line of Freemasons 5, q 23. (Note: He also elegantly evokes the fact that, at the time of this order, Magnan was not a Freemason.) During a meeting with Napoleon III, the latter confirmed his desire to merge the two obediences. Resisting this imperial pressure, Guillaume Viennet pointed out that the constitutions of the Supreme Council did not authorize mergers with other Masonic obediences and invited the Emperor, who had the power to do so, to dissolve the Supreme Council if he so wished. Marshal Magnan persisted in pushing through the imperial project, and issued a decree on February 23 dissolving the Supreme Council and threatening the Scottish Lodges with illegality if they did not submit. Guillaume Viennet quickly rejected this communication, declaring the decree null and void and pointing out that only the Emperor could dissolve the Order. At the Grand Master's Council of June 3, Magnan faced an internal challenge calling for his departure. He refused to resign and acknowledged his failure, as the authorities had refused to close the recalcitrant lodges.

Marshal Magnan suffered another major setback when the 1865 convent of the Grand Orient refused to approve his proposal to transform obedience into an "institution of public utility." The idea was approved by the order's council, who saw it not only as a means of recognizing Freemasonry but also as a financial opportunity to alleviate the Grand Orient's debt since the purchase of the Hôtel Richelieu. Only one of the Order's councilors, André Roussel, was opposed to the change, and while he was unable to rally any other councilors to his cause, he did manage to convince many of the convent's delegates of the disadvantages. His argument sought to demonstrate that the transformation into a large relief society would lead to the "inevitable ruin" of masonry by subjecting it to civil power, the ideal means of controlling and monitoring it closely. (Note: The project provided for the appointment of grandmasters by the emperor) The reform was rejected by 123 votes to 63.

Despite several setbacks, in 1864, Marshal Magnan obtained from the Emperor the return of a fundamental right for Grand Orient Freemasons - the right to designate their Grand Master. The restoration of this right enabled him to regain great popularity with Parisian and provincial lodges. The convent re-elected him with almost all delegates. He did not have time to take advantage of this new legitimacy, as he died suddenly on May 29, 1865, on the eve of the convent. His religious funeral was celebrated by Georges Darboy, Archbishop of Paris, who officiated over a coffin covered with Masonic emblems. (Note: Pope Pius IX condemned the gesture and issued a reprimand to Georges Darboy, who, in response, continued to develop the autonomy of the French clergy.) On June 9, the convent chooses a new Grand Master in the person of General Émile Mellinet.

=== 1865 - 1870: the great mastery of General Mellinet ===
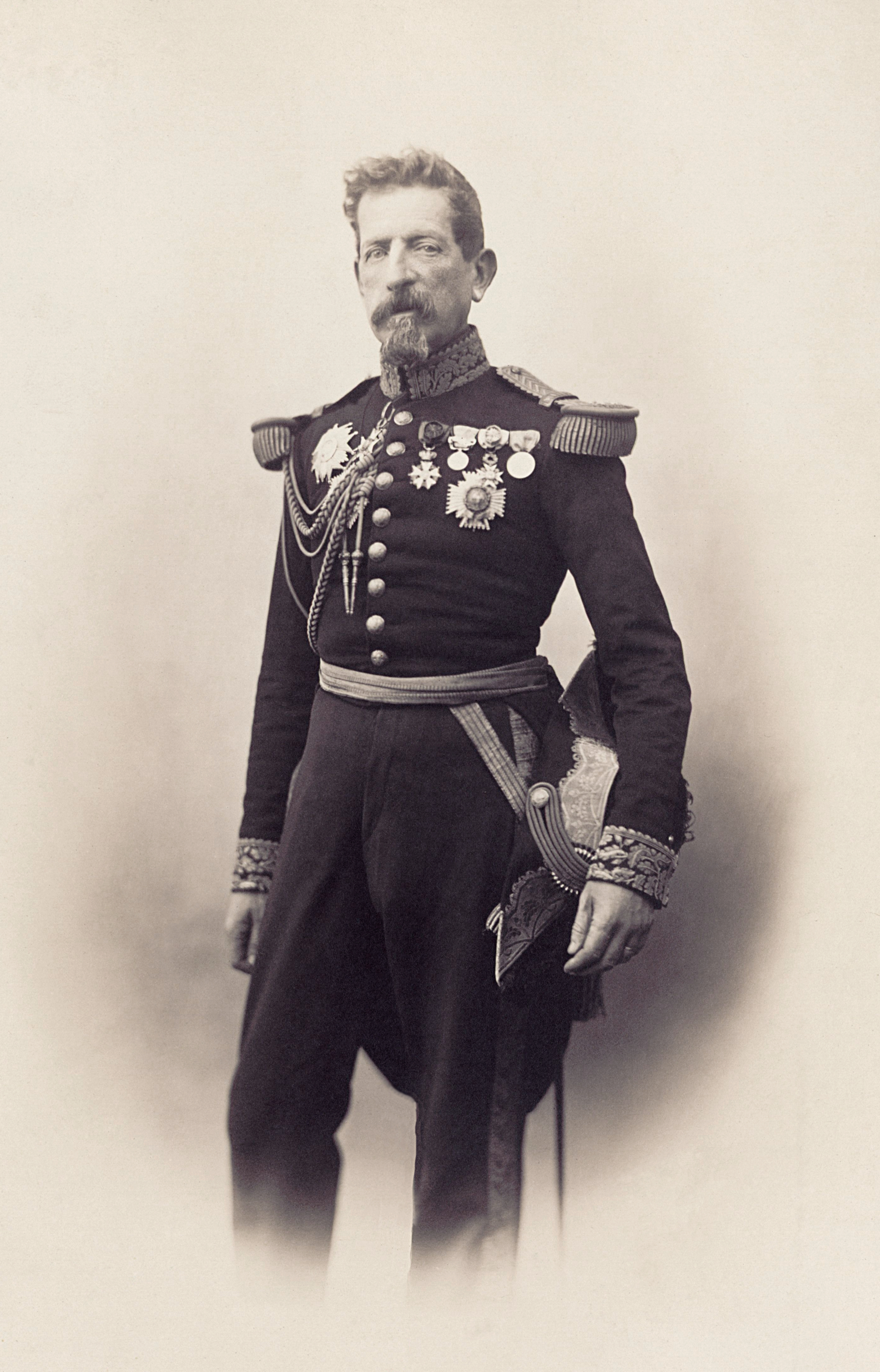
General Émile Mellinet, Grand Master from 1865 to 1870.

Unlike his predecessor, Émile Mellinet was a long-standing Freemason. The son and grandson of a Freemason, he was initiated at the age of 16 in Thionville, before being raised to Companion, then Master in the Nantes lodge "Mars et les Arts". At the time of his election as Grand Master, he was commander of the Seine National Guard. When he was elected, the Order's council was also largely renewed: the "centrists," such as philosopher Charles Fauvety and lawyer Achille Jouaust, were in the majority. In this liberal period of the Empire, the five years of General Mellinet's Grand Mastership had little impact on French Freemasonry. During his tenure, which spanned the period from the death of Marshal Magnan to the fall of the Empire, lodges enjoyed a certain degree of freedom, and recruitment was more broadly based in circles often opposed to the Empire. Workshops focused on progressive themes, such as the admission of women to Freemasonry and on the deteriorating relations with the Catholic Church, which led to a rise in anti-clericalism in the lodges. However, under his presidency, the GODF grew from 230 to 292 lodges. Tired of the many quarrels between supporters and opponents of compulsory belief in God, but also keen to indulge his cultural passions in his hometown, he did not seek re-election, despite being widely re-elected by the June 1870 convent. Acknowledging his choice, the conventuals elected the secular, republican journalist Léonide Babaud-Laribière as Grand Master.

==== Evolution of the obedience and lodges ====
During this period, the GODF, while remaining an initiatory society, was slowly transforming into a philosophical and more political society. The ban on openly political debates within lodges did not prevent members from discussing societal or religious issues. The 1864 encyclical Quanta cura, which violently attacked modernity in general and the "Masonic sect" in particular, accusing it of conspiring against the Catholic Church and the government, reinforced the anti-clericalism latent since the Restoration within a Freemasonry that was increasingly attracting young Republicans and openly agnostic or atheist members. This evolution contributed to the questioning of the obligation to believe in God enshrined in the Grand Orient's constitution since 1849. While some lodges in Paris and the provinces were content with a Masonic practice centered on benevolence and fraternal sociability, others debated justice, the abolition of the death penalty, divorce or the social role of women in a new society yet to be built. Lodges remained aloof from totally political subjects, however, to avoid repression from the authorities. The liberalization of the regime and the return of the proscribed favored a broad diversification of the work of the lodges, which significantly increased their membership, mainly in areas where the Republican Party was very active. Documentation does not allow us to establish the precise sociological composition of the lodges, although their numbers increased significantly during the liberal period. Lodges in the capital, however, were largely republican; in the provinces, the situation was less homogeneous, as several lodges were openly Bonapartist, often provoking internal conflicts. The vast majority of Bonapartist Freemasons left Freemasonry with the advent of the Third Republic. From 1865, an independent Masonic press began to appear, such as La Chaîne d'Union, which published reports of lodge debates. The obedience's annual convents also tended to become politicized, with the 1870 meeting unanimously supporting the petition for free and compulsory education organized by the Ligue de l'enseignement. Adopted in 1849, the triple principle of Liberty - Equality - Fraternity officially became the Order's motto.

=== French Supreme Council ===
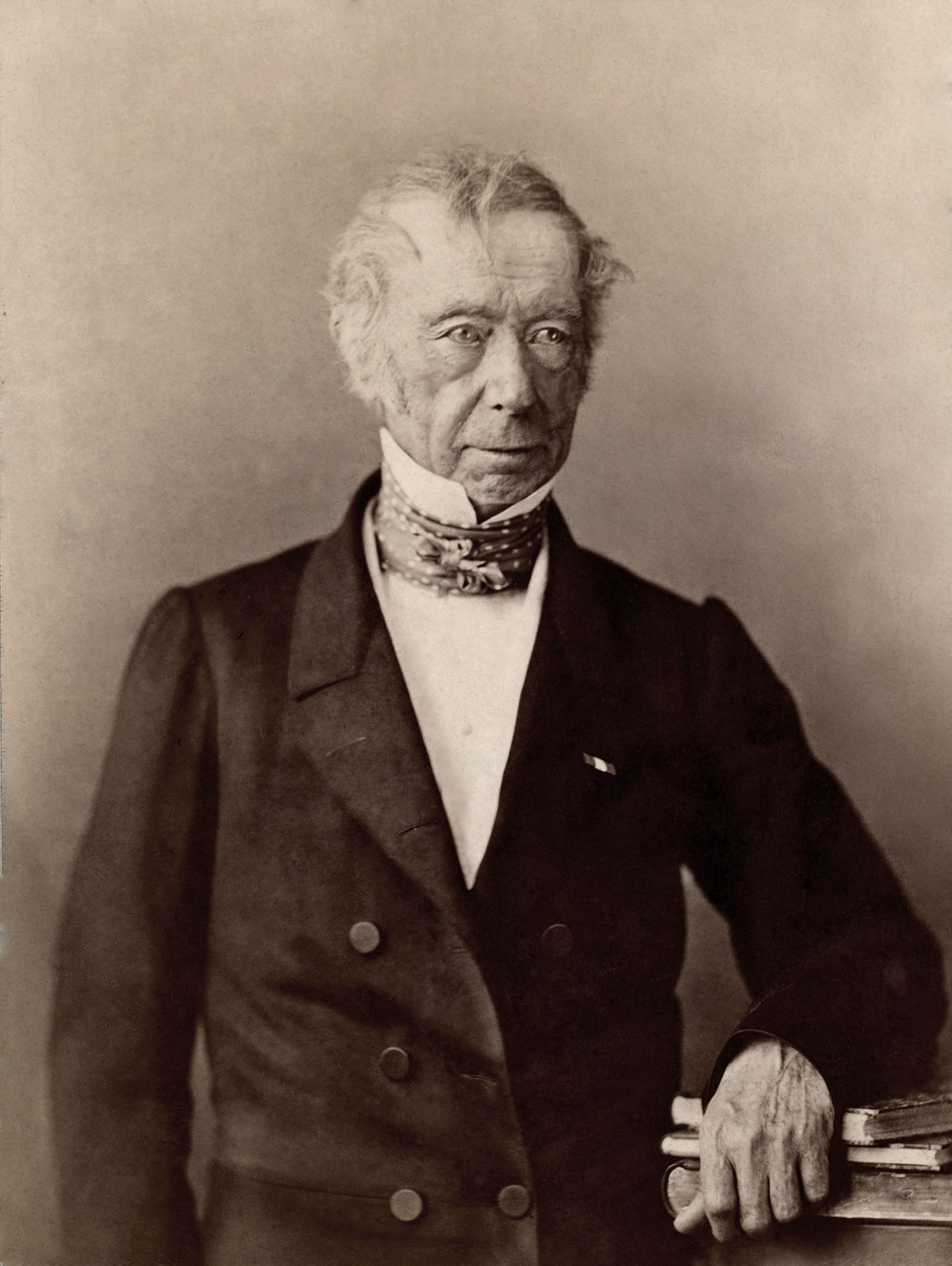
Jean-Pons-Guillaume Viennet, President of the French Supreme Council.

France's second-largest obedience, the Suprême Conseil de France was headed by Guillaume Viennet from 1860. He enjoyed great popularity within his order, having successfully opposed the attempted absorption of the Grand Orient de France. All political or religious discussions were statutorily forbidden, a prohibition common to all obediences in France. The Council's refusal to support the 1848 revolution led to its first split: the most progressive members founded a "Grande Loge Nationale de France," whose constitutions embodied republican ideals. It was quickly banned in January 1851 for refusing to exclude political and social issues from its lodges debates. While still held in high esteem, Guillaume Viennet was criticized for voting against Émile Littré's admission to the Académie française in 1863. In the years 1865-1870, the Supreme Council followed an identical evolution to that of the Grand Orient; Guillaume Viennet, however, had little idea of the internal evolution of the Lodges, whose sensibility was increasingly similar to that of the Grand Orient, and which, like those of that obedience, were beginning to question the obligation of belief in God contained in the General Statutes.

The 40 or so lodges of the Supreme Council are mainly based in Paris, with few in the provinces. They are very active and sometimes more offensive than those of the Grand Orient. The most prestigious lodge was "L'Écossaise 133", which created the magazine Le monde maçonnique and led the protest against the governing bodies in 1868. Guillaume Viennet's death put an end to the crisis, and the new Grand Commander appointed a popular and well-liked figure, Adolphe Crémieux, as 1st Vice-President. The Lodges were also home to a radical current with Henri Brisson, Charles Floquet, Camille Raspail, and Gustave Mesureur.

== Freemasons in exile ==
Freemasons exiled mainly to the British Isles came in different waves linked to political events in France. The first stemmed from the insurrectionary days and riots of 1848, the second from the failed demonstration of June 13, 1849 in opposition to the policies pursued in Rome by the government of the Second Republic, and the last from the founding coup d'état of the Second Empire. From the British Isles, a Freemasonry with a revolutionary foundation.

In 1850, publicist Jean Phillipe Berjeau, editor of the international political column La voix du proscrit, founded a London lodge under the auspices of the Memphis Rite created by Jean Étienne Marconis de Nègre, which gave rise to a Grand Lodge of Philadelphians. Around this grand lodge, a fraternal society of socialist democrats, open to all, worked to bring together the proscribed. Many prominent figures were active in these societies and lodges, including Louis Blanc, Félix Pyat, and Jean-Baptiste Boichot, who returned to France to organize the democrat-socialist movement. Arrested following a denunciation, he was released in 1859. The Philadelphes Lodge became a haven for all republican tendencies. Many of its members were also active in the International Association of Revolutionaries.

== War of 1870 ==
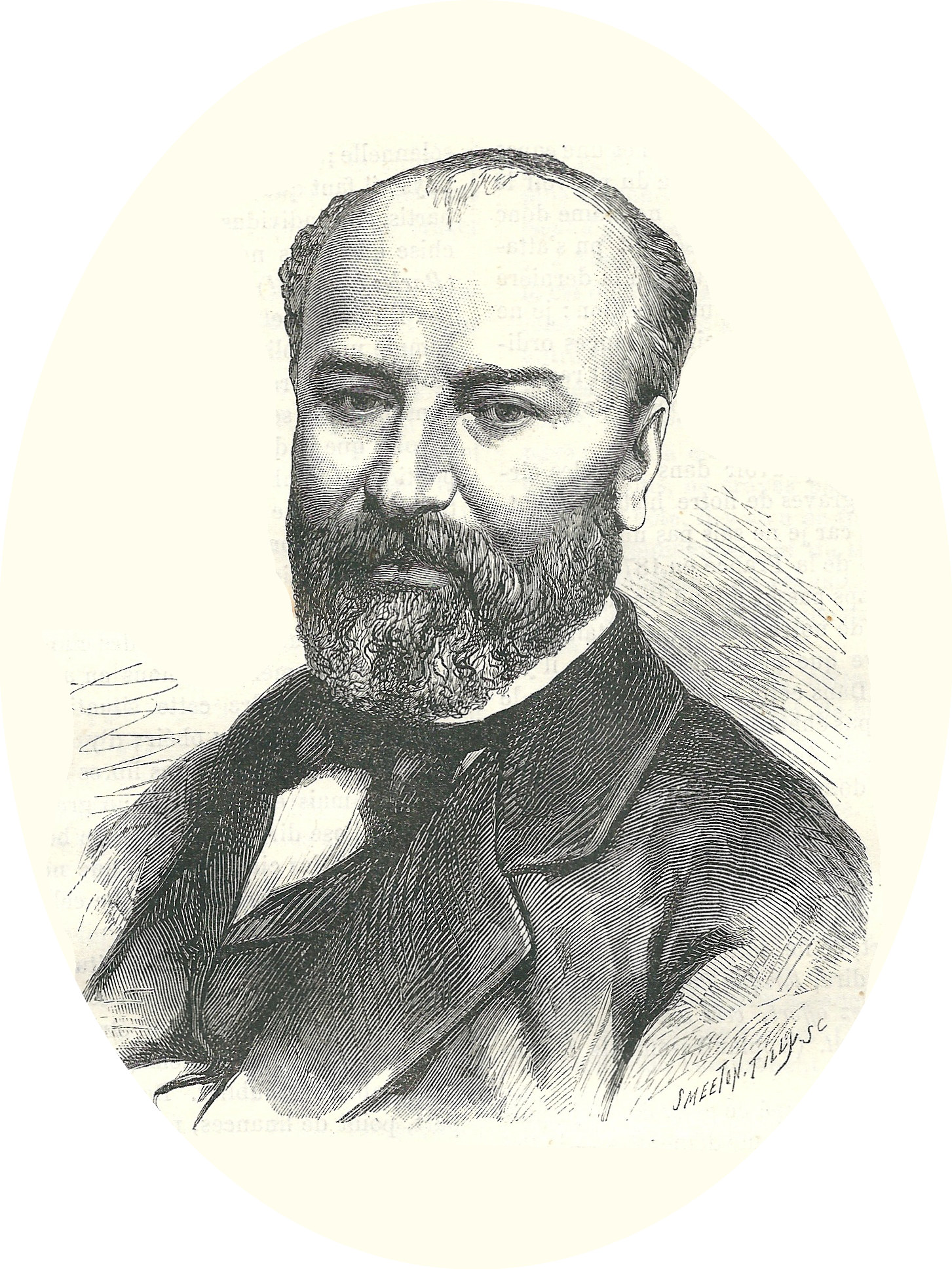
Léonide Babaud-Laribière Grand Master of the Grand Orient de France.

Léonide Babaud-Laribière Grand Master of the Grand Orient de France. On the eve of the 1870 war, the two French obediences were led by bourgeois personalities. They became predominantly liberal and republican, the idea of Freemasonry as heir to the French Revolution became widespread, and anticlericalism became more pronounced with the presence of a radical Grandissant current.

The pacifist movement was also well established in French lodges when war was declared. Freemasons such as Edmond Potonié-Pierre, founder of the "Ligue universelle du bien public" (Universal League for the Public Good), led this movement. The Supreme Council magazine Le monde maçonnique highlighted the importance of the "League for Peace" in its columns. Lodges joined the "Peace Union" founded in Le Havre in 1866. The Grand Orient de France signed friendship treaties with several German obediences; reciprocal visits between French and German workshops were widely authorized. The French obediences took no position on the declaration of war, thereby demonstrating their distrust of imperial foreign policy choices. In August 1870, the Order's Council voted to implement humanitarian measures aimed at helping Freemasons in the armed forces and war victims, whatever their nationality. To a lesser extent, European obediences such as the Grand Orient of Italy and the Swiss Grand Lodge Alpina launched a manifesto in favor of peace. For its part, the Grand Orient of Belgium condemned German policy and promoted the opening of military hospitals. While members of French Masonic orders generally did their duty, Léonide Babaud-Laribière, Grand Master of the Grand Orient, considered the declaration of war to be the Empire's "supreme folly ".

The defeat at Sedan, the fall of the Empire, and the proclamation of the Republic put an end to pacifist actions. Many Freemasons joined the provisional government, and some forty, including Léonide Babaud-Laribière, were appointed prefects. From then on, a large number of lodges supported the war against the "Prussian invader" and the defense of the new republic. During the siege of Paris, a dozen Parisian lodges of the Grand Orient took part in an unusual action concerning the allegedly anti-Masonic conduct of William I, Grand Master of Prussian Freemasonry, and his son. A severely worded manifesto was published denouncing the bombing and burning of cities and accusing the two monarchs of treason, perjury, and dishonesty. Added to this is a denunciation of the fanaticization of the German people by the monarch and his heir around sectarian Protestantism, making them responsible for the deaths of a million men. The document ends with an appeal to German Freemasons to "cast off the chains of servitude and turn to social progress".

The widely circulated manifesto was echoed in the press and within the Order; Jean-Claude Colfavru, a former outlaw, agreed to preside over a general assembly of "mise en jugement" held on October 29, attended by over 1,500 Freemasons who took part in the debate. In the end, some one hundred lodges signed a "Masonic indictment" to be transmitted to the Prussian authorities, carried by a delegation requesting safe conduct from the government to reach the Prussian siege lines. The revolutionary day of October 31 postponed the project, which was subsequently abandoned. The German Grand Lodges protested against the manifesto, broke off relations with the Grand Orient, and demanded a public disavowal of the accusations. The Grand Orient responded with a commission of inquiry into the behavior of German Freemasonry during the war but did not publish the results. (Note: The results do not indict the German Freemasons, nor do they confirm any anti-Masonic behavior on their part. For reasons of expediency, the results are kept under wraps.)

== Commune de Paris ==
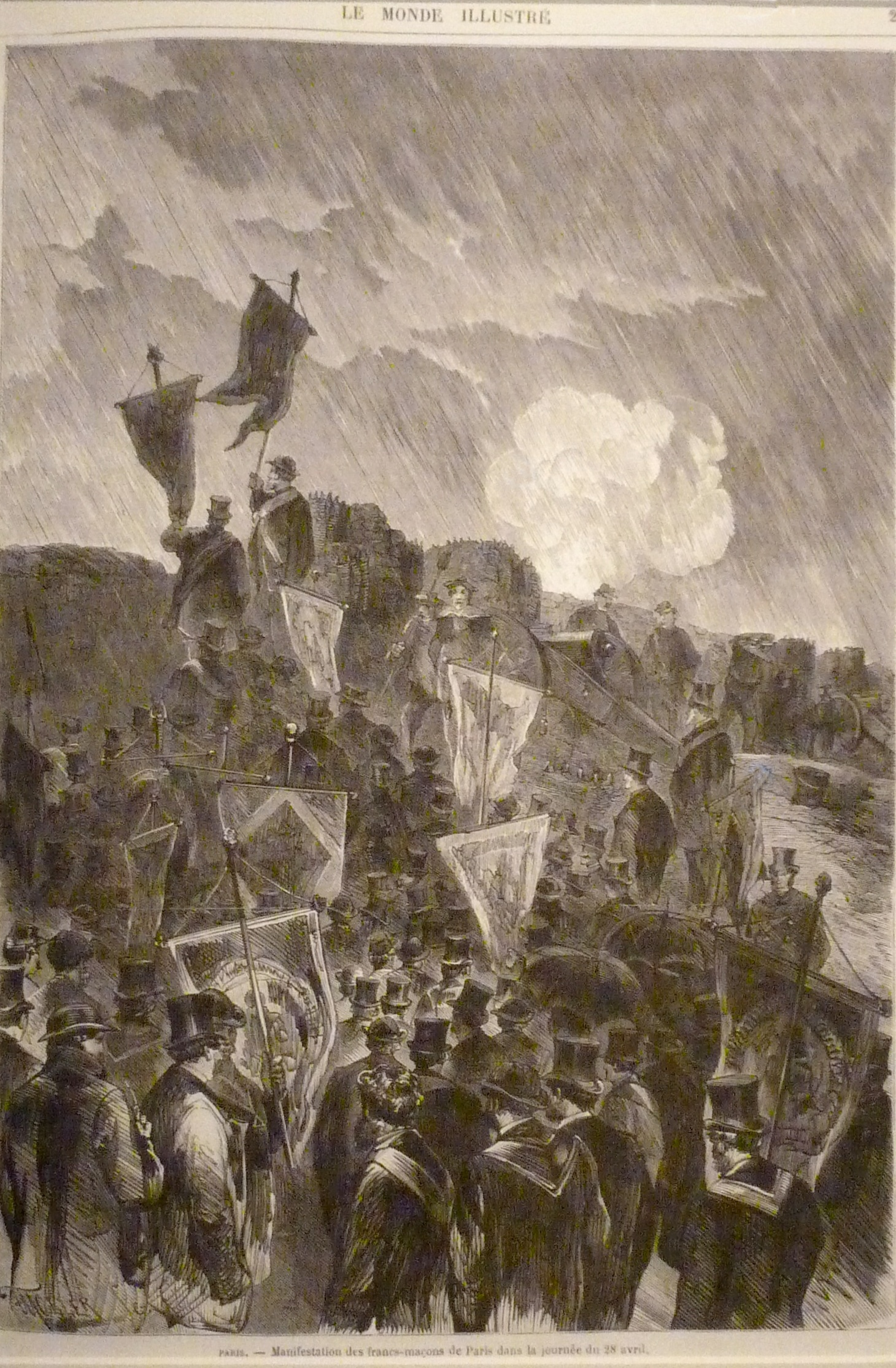
Paris Commune, Freemasons' demonstration.

The Paris Commune insurrection began on March 18, 1871: the government led by Adolphe Thiers and the mayor of Paris, Jules Ferry, accompanied by numerous troops and civil servants, left Paris for Versailles. The Parisian elected representatives included between 18 and 24 Freemasons out of a total of 86. One faction wanted to join the Commune, while another, led by Charles Floquet, wanted only to reconcile Versailles and Paris. Two opinions were clearly expressed within Freemasonry: those of the "advanced " (Note: In his book La franc-maçonnerie et l'Etat (Freemasonry and the State), Albert Lantoine uses the term "advanced lodges" to describe lodges where the radical current is dominant. Historian André Combes uses the term "avant-garde" to describe them) lodges, mainly in Paris, and those of the lodges that remained legalistic.

Freemasons were to be found in both camps: like Louis Blanc, who disavowed the insurrection, the vast majority of Freemason politicians sided with the government, but some Parisian Freemasons, like Félix Pyat and Jules Vallès, were sympathizers or supporters of the Commune and joined the fighting.

On the morning of April 29, a procession of Freemasons holding banners bearing the insignia of their orders crossed the streets of Paris. They headed for the city limits, sending the Versailles a peace delegation in vain. By the end of Bloody Week and the crushing of the insurrection, almost two hundred Freemasons had died in the fighting. However, the governing bodies of the obediences protected themselves from any accusation of complicity with the Commune by roundly condemning the actions of Communard Freemasons. The Grand Master of the Grand Orient sent a statement to the workshops denouncing "criminal sedition" and blaming the individual actions of "unworthy members" who were tarnishing the Order's peacemaking work. On the part of the French Supreme Council, the Grand Secretary General pointed to "the regrettable conduct of a few" who were jeopardizing Freemasonry as a whole. Some Parisian lodges expelled members for involvement in the insurrection; in the provinces, lodges remained generally cautious during the events, hesitating between silence and condemnation.

Historical documentation shows that two conceptions of Freemasonry were active during the Commune without openly clashing. Some members, mainly from Paris, supported or participated in the insurrection, adhering to the idea that Freemasons should be in the vanguard of social movements to spearhead social change. Another part, which respects the individual choice of its members while inviting them to limit themselves to humanitarian and conciliatory actions, stands aside. The documentation also reveals a political difference between Parisian and provincial lodges. The obediences generally took no sides as institutions and remained legalistic. However, Freemasons, and sometimes lodges, took part in events according to their convictions. (Note: 100 years later, in May 1971, an annual Masonic memorial ceremony was inaugurated by the Grand Orient de France in front of the Mur des Fédérés, which pays tribute to the Communards.)

== End of the Empire ==
During the Second Empire, the city of Paris asserted itself as the center of French Freemasonry, with lodges that were part of different and sometimes complex sociabilities; nevertheless, they were representative of an enlightened bourgeoisie that recognized the importance of education. Internal debates culminated in the creation of the Symbolic Scottish Grand Lodge in 1880 in response to the democratic aspirations of some of the members of the French Supreme Council and the birth of mixed Freemasonry with Droit Humain in 1893.

The arrival of atheist freethinkers in its ranks led to changes and evolutions within this predominantly deist masonry for some time to come. By the end of the Empire, it was completely on the Republican side. By the end of this period, the Grand Orient had become the backbone and school of the Republican party, revealing the important role Freemasonry was to play in French society during the Third Republic.

== See also ==
- Freemasonry
- Second French Empire
- French Third Republic
- French Freemasonry under the Second Republic
- Freemasonry in France
- Grand Orient de France

== Bibliography ==
- Queruel, Alain (2019). La franc-maçonnerie sous Napoléon III (in French). Preface by Yves Hivert-Messeca. Éditions Cépaduès. ISBN 978-2-36493-773-4.
- Morlat, Patrice (2019). La République des Frères: Le Grand Orient de France de 1870 à 1940 (in French). Preface by Pierre Mollier. Éditions Perrin. ISBN 978-2-262-07726-6.
- Hivert-Messeca, Yves (2014). L'Europe sous l'acacia : Histoire de la franc-maçonnerie européenne du XVIIIe siècle à nos jours (in French). Éditions Dervy. ISBN 979-10-242-0023-1.
- Combes, André (2014). Commune de Paris: la franc-maçonnerie déchirée coll. Sparsa Colligo (in French). Preface by Jean-Robert Ragache. Éditions Dervy. ISBN 979-10-242-0047-7.
- Ligou, Daniel (2017). Dictionnaire de la franc-maçonnerie (in French) (5 ed.). Paris: Presses universitaires de France. ISBN 978-2-13-055094-5.
- Bauer, Alain; Mollier, Pierre (2012). Le Grand Orient de France (in French). Paris: Presses universitaires de France. ISBN 978-2-13-058866-5.
- Chevallier, Pierre (1974). Histoire de la franc-maçonnerie française: La maçonnerie: missionnaire du libéralisme (in French). Vol. 2. Librairie Arthème Fayard. ISBN 2-213-00082-4.
