= Grande Loge Nationale Française =

Freemason lodge in France

- Established: 1913
- Region served: France
- Website: Official website

The Grande Loge Nationale Française (French pronunciation: [ɡʁɑ̃d lɔʒ nɑsjɔnal fʁɑ̃sɛːz]; abbr. GLNF) is a French Masonic Grand Lodge. It was founded in 1913, by two lodges, "Le Centre des Amis" Lodge splitting from Grand Orient de France and "L'Anglaise" lodge, an independent lodge based in Bordeaux. GLNF is based on monotheism and the 1929 precepts of regularity issued by the United Grand Lodge of England.

The all-male Grande Loge traditionnelle et symbolique Opéra split from the GLNF in 1958, as did the National French Lodge in 1968, and more recently the Grand Prieuré des Gaules.

== Rites ==
Following an influx of a large number of brethren from the Grande Loge de France breaking away in protest of that obedience's treaty with the Grand Orient de France, the Ancient and Accepted Scottish Rite became the most prevalent rite, even in the blue lodge degrees.

Following the research of a number of the brethren into the history of the Rectified Scottish Rite, interest grew in restoring the French Rite to regular freemasonry in France. This led ultimately to a patent being obtained in 1989 from the Supreme Council of the Modern Rite for Brazil, which traced its ancestry back to France from before the Great Schism of 1877, and which had always remained regular. The French Rite has grown considerably in the GLNF in the last 20 years and is now practised by about 15% of its lodges.

Recently, lodges have been added that work the Standard Scottish Rite, bringing to six the total number of rites worked in the jurisdiction.

== Crisis from 2009 ==
In December 2009, Grand Master François Stifani faced down a rebellion by members of his own Grand Lodge about the expenditure of €17 million on political subscriptions. The rebels went to the courts. In January 2011 Mlle Monique Legrand was designated by French legal authorities to manage the Grand Lodge, deepening a major internal crisis, and bringing international repercussions. Following the publication of the suspension of relations by most of the "Regular" European Grand Lodges, the United Grand Lodge of England voted on 14 September 2011 to suspend relations with the GLNF, with several US Grand Lodges subsequently doing so as well.

On 10 June 2012, in the Basel Declaration the five Grand Lodges of Switzerland, Belgium, Austria, Germany and Luxembourg jointly withdrew recognition from Grande Loge Nationale Française, declaring the damage irremediable. The declaration encouraged Grande Loge de France to take the lead in rebuilding a basis for regular Freemasonry in France, offering assistance if it would sever its links with irregular obediences. The declaration also offered support to the ordinary brethren who simply want to continue their masonry. On 12 September 2012, the United Grand Lodge of England followed suit, citing the schisms within GLNF, and stating that it was not in control of its own affairs.

Shortly afterwards, Stifani resigned, being replaced in December by Jean-Pierre Servel. Legrand promptly handed back the administration of the order to Servel, leaving the organisation once more in charge of its own affairs. Servel suspended, then expelled Stifani. Documents showed Stifani had pledged the allegiance of his Grand Lodge to Nicolas Sarkozy as early as January 2008.

Repercussions of the dispute continued to isolate GLNF. Servel denied the legitimacy of the Basel Declaration, claiming the five Grand Lodges had no right to criticise or interfere with the internal affairs of another Grand Lodge. A statement from UGLE in September 2013 acknowledged that progress had been made in GLDF, but made it plain that there was still much to do, and that UGLE had no immediate plans to re-recognise it; the UGLE statement also intimated that it would be taking no part in GLNF's centenary celebrations.

Finally, following their Quarterly Communications meetings held in each jurisdiction in June 2014, the United Grand Lodge of England, the Grand Lodge of Ireland, and the Grand Lodge of Scotland issued a joint statement recognizing "that the actions taken by the current leadership of the GLNF have actively and comprehensively addressed the problems which led to the withdrawal of recognition ... and that peace and harmony have now been restored," and accordingly each jurisdiction had moved resolutions "to restore recognition to the GLNF, which resolutions were accepted."

== Gallery ==
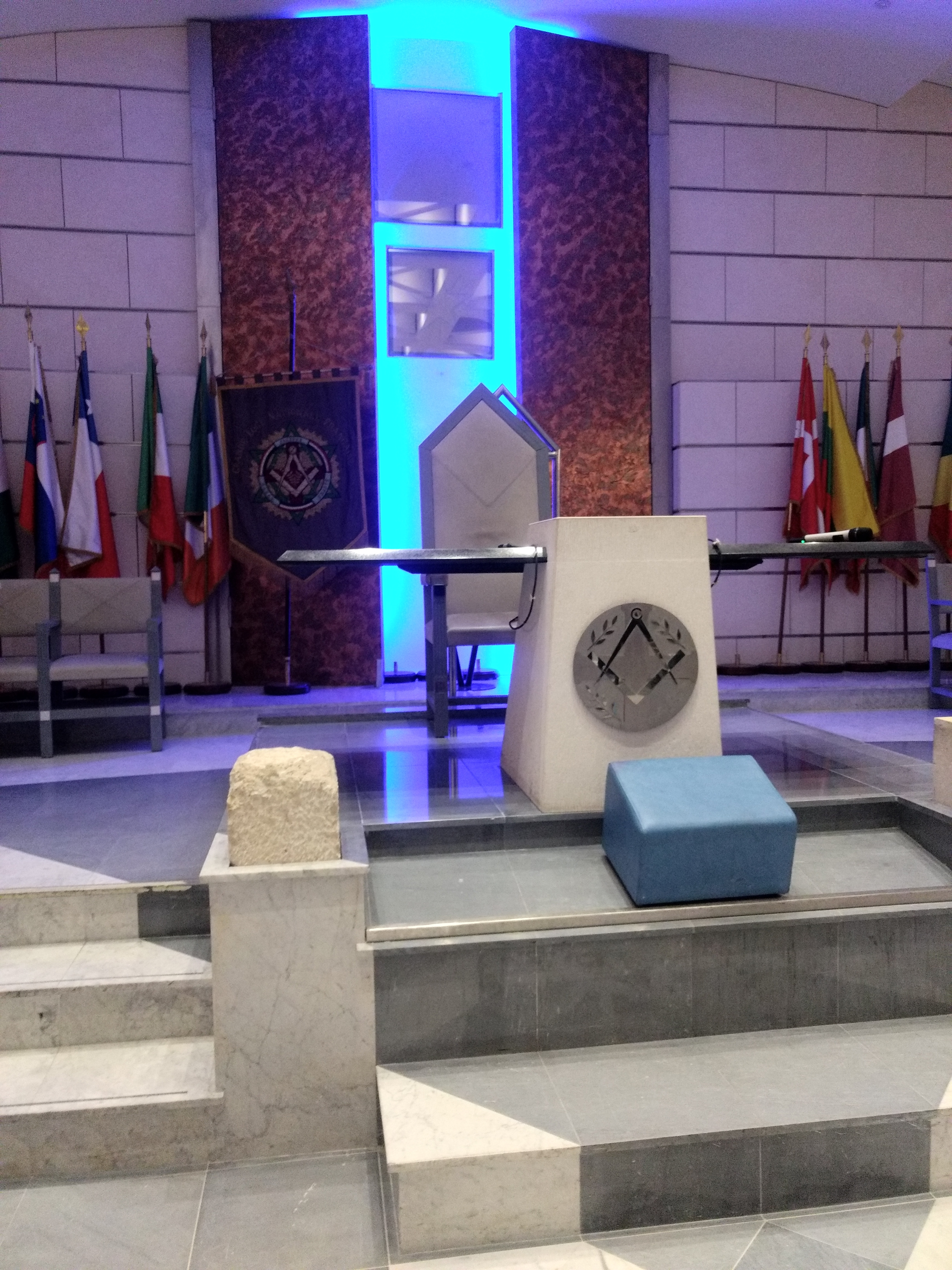
Throne in the largest temple of the Paris headquarters

== See also ==
- French Freemasonry under the Second Republic
- Grand Orient de France
- Freemasonry in France
- French Rite
