= List of hunchbacks in fiction =

Below is a list of hunchbacks in fiction.

- Quasimodo in The Hunchback of Notre-Dame (1831). He was born with a hunchback and feared by the townspeople as a sort of monster but he finds sanctuary in an unlikely love that is fulfilled only in death.
- Scaramouche in the 2-act ballet-pantomime Scaramouche, to a libretto by the Danish playwright Poul Knudsen and with original music by the Finnish composer Jean Sibelius (Op. 71, 1913)
- Manthara in the Ramayana. She was the maid who convinced Queen Kaikeyi that the throne of Ayodhya belonged to her son Bharata and that her step-son crown-prince Rama (the hero of the Ramayana) should be exiled from the kingdom.
- Gru in Despicable Me.
- Salad Fingers in Salad Fingers.
- Jean Cadoret in Jean de Florette and Manon des Sources.
- Fritz in Frankenstein and 1823 play Presumption: or the Fate of Frankenstein; he is an assistant of Dr. Frankenstein. In other productions, he is typically named Igor.
- Karl in the 1935 film Bride of Frankenstein; he is one of Dr. Septimus' Pretorius' cronies.
- Riff Raff in The Rocky Horror Picture Show (1975); he is a hunch-backed servant of Dr. Frank N. Furter and sometimes serves as a lab assistant of this scientist.
- Edgar "E" Gore from 2012 animated film Frankenweenie; he is a hunch-backed child and ally of Victor Frankenstein.
- Modo from The Hunchback Assignments books series by Arthur Slade; as a child he was traveling with a freak show, but later was rescued by mysterious Mr. Socrates, and, after a couple years (reaching the age of fourteen) he was forced to start living on the streets of London.
- Dr. Heinz Doofenshmirtz from Phineas and Ferb is a bumbling mad scientist intent on conquering the Tri-State Area with his inventions.
- Harold Allnut from DC Comics is a mute aide of Batman, and has proved to be very gifted in terms of technology and electronics.
- Richard III from the eponymous Shakespeare play.
- Rigoletto from opera Rigoletto by Giuseppe Verdi; he is a court jester.
- Barquentine from Mervyn Peake Gormenghast is the son of Sourdust, the Master of Ritual of Gormenghast castle.
- The title character from the telenovela Rina.
- Pastor Galswells from Corpse Bride is a haughty and bad-tempered priest who is hired to conduct Victor and Victoria's marriage.
- Jaclyn/Heidi in the animated film Igor is a hunchbacked female, but can transform in guise of many beautiful women.
- Tom from Harry Potter book and film series; he is a landlord, innkeeper, and barman of the Leaky Cauldron.
- Philip Wakem from "The Mill on the Floss" by George Eliot
- Lumpy Addams from The Addams Family
- Ephialtes of Trachis from 300
- Jack Dudley from the 1892 children's novel Jack the Hunchback by James Otis
- Yennefer of Vengerberg from The Witcher was a hunchback whose deformities were fixed magically.
- The 1920 novel The Tower of the Seven Hunchbacks and its 1944 film adaptation feature nefarious hunchback living under Madrid.
- Cousin Lymon in the 1951 novella The Ballad of the Sad Café by Carson McCullers.
