= List of people known as the Hunchback =

Hunchback, Hunchbacked, or Humpback is an epithet applied to:

- Adam de la Halle (1240–1287), French poet, composer and musician
- Alfonso Fróilaz, briefly the king of the unified kingdom of Asturias, Galicia and León in 925
- Godfrey IV, Duke of Lower Lorraine (died 1076)
- Inge I of Norway (1135–1161), a king of Norway
- John the Hunchback (fl. 492–499), Byzantine general and politician
- Konrad II the Hunchback (1252/65–1304), Duke of Ścinawa, patriarch of Aquileia and Duke of Żagań
- Louis VIII, Duke of Bavaria (1403–1445)
- Mahmud I (1696–1754), Sultan of the Ottoman Empire
- Pepin the Hunchback (c. 768/769–811), Frankish prince, eldest son of Charlemagne
- Robert de Beaumont, 2nd Earl of Leicester (1104–1168)
- Władysław the Hunchback (c. 1303/1305–1351/1352), Polish prince

== See also ==
- Alasdair Crotach MacLeod (1450–1547), Scottish chief of Clan MacLeod, Crotach being Scottish Gaelic for "hunchbacked"
