= Freemasonry in the French Third Republic =

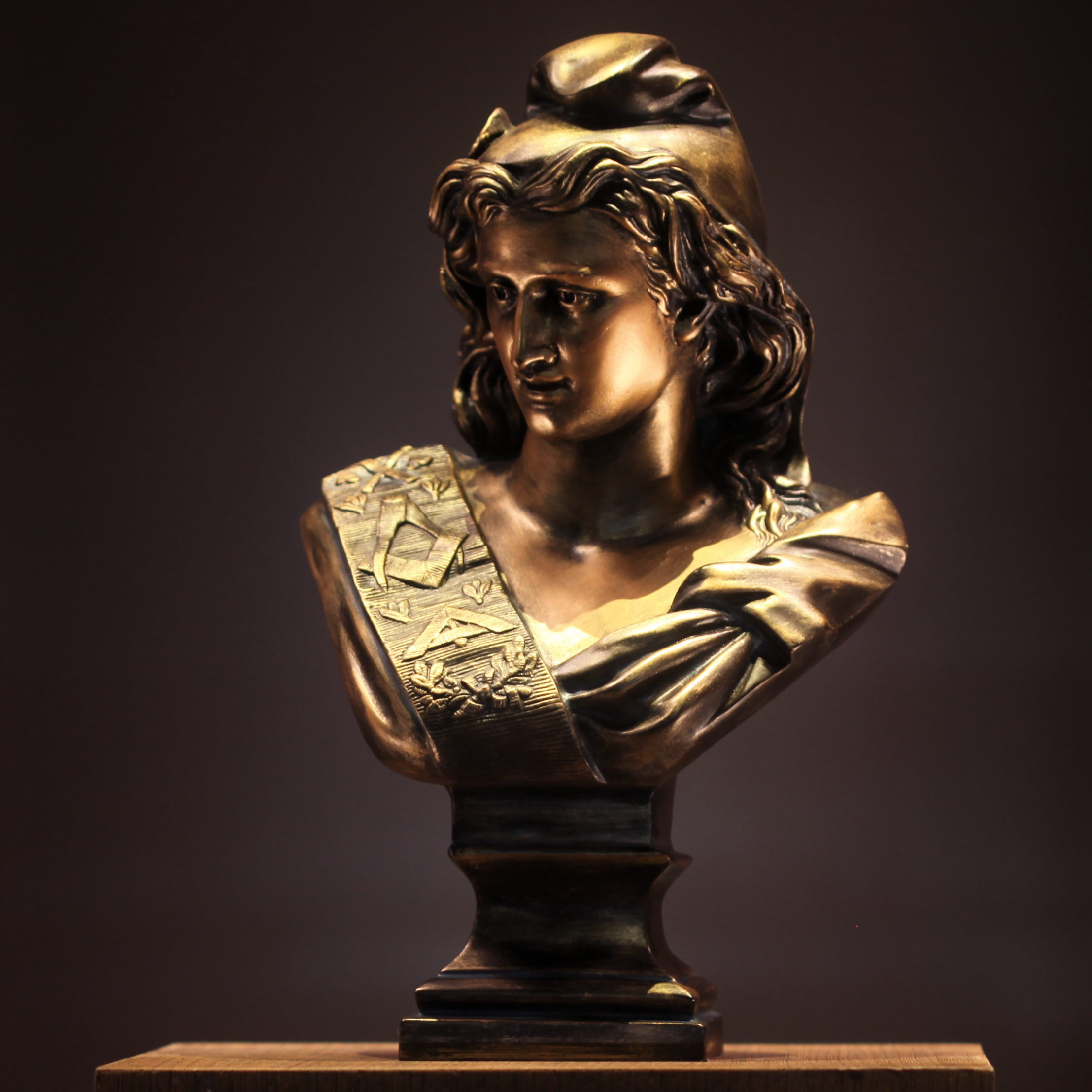
Masonic Marianne by Paul Lecreux (1887).

Freemasonry played a significant role in the political and social life of the French Third Republic. It played a pivotal role within the ideological and institutional framework of the Republican camp, with its members demonstrating a profound affiliation with the Radical Party. Freemasonry frequently exerted influence over public life, whether directly or indirectly. A constant in political life during this period, Freemasonry enjoyed significant support among the electorate, earning the nickname "Church of the Republic". Its positions were frequently endorsed and implemented. Freemasonry was divided into two closely aligned yet competing obediences, both of which refrained from supporting the admission of women into masonic lodges, despite the creation of the first mixed-gender obedience in 1893. Additionally, it encountered new developments and schisms driven by more traditional or spiritual currents.

From 1877 until the advent of World War II, Freemasons played a prominent role in the political institutions of the Third Republic. This is evidenced by the considerable representation of Freemasons in successive governments and the numerous national and local elected officials who were Freemasons. In periods of governmental difficulty, Freemasons provided support through the robust connections established between Masonic lodges and the Republican regime. During this era, nearly all the presidents of the Council of the Order of the Grand Orient of France held political positions. Similarly, the Scottish Symbolic Grand Lodge and later the Grand Lodge of France, imbued with a similar spirit, also had several prominent members who occupied elective or ministerial roles.

French Freemasonry was unwavering in its opposition to "religious obscurantism" and demonstrated a clear intent to eradicate clericalism. It openly supported the Republican Party and played a significant role in the struggle for secular education and the secularization of France. Although Freemasonry did not actively participate in the colonization of territories during the Second French Colonial Empire, it subsequently contributed to its development through local lodges by promoting Republican values among the indigenous populations of controlled territories. From its pre-World War I pacifism to the Union sacrée during the 1914–1918 war, Freemasonry emerged after the conflict as a vocal opponent of threats to secularism between 1920 and 1924. Subsequently, it provided substantial backing to the recently established League of Nations and the left-wing Cartel des Gauches. Following the dissolution of the latter, Freemasonry disengaged from political involvement, instead concentrating its attention on its symbolic and initiatory tenets.

The determination of Freemasonry to achieve its goals of free thought, secularization, and social progress, as well as its involvement in political crises or scandals that directly affect Masonic orders or individual members, has resulted in numerous grievances and hostilities. Such developments gave rise to virulent reactionary and anti-Masonic movements. Nationalist and ultraconservative Catholic factions exploited the circumstances of the fall of the Third Republic, the onset of collaboration following the 1940 defeat, and the rise of the Vichy regime to suppress Freemasonry and discriminate against its members. The resurgence of Freemasonry after World War II, occurring concurrently with the formation of the Fourth Republic, signified a transition away from overt and public political involvement. Instead, its attention shifted towards more subtle pursuits, encompassing symbolic, societal, or spiritual initiatives, contingent upon the orientation of each Masonic order.

== The Republic behind the veil ==
From 1877 to 1940, Freemasonry sought—and often succeeded—in implementing its vision of political and social ideals within society through the membership of a majority of Republican political figures in Masonic orders. Pierre Chevallier characterized its public engagement in the nation's political affairs, both directly and indirectly, as the "Church of the Republic". During this period, French Freemasonry experienced, depending on varying perspectives, its greatest era, and its most significant challenges.

The memberships and commitments were experienced in many ways, with some maintaining consistent involvement, while others distanced themselves or terminated their involvement entirely. During the Second Empire, Freemasonry, which was placed under supervision, had virtually no influence on imperial power, particularly during the authoritarian period. However, the more liberal phase, which permitted greater openness for the Masonic orders, foreshadowed forthcoming reforms in education and a shift in anticlericalism, which remained moderate at the time. The definitive victory of the Republicans in 1877 resulted in numerous Freemasons assuming elected positions as deputies, senators, general councilors, and mayors.

In 1877, the Grand Orient of France, the principal French Masonic obedience, removed the obligation to believe in God from its constitutions, thereby affirming its commitment to "absolute freedom of conscience." (Note: Dachez & Kupferman 2020, pp. 101–102) At its 1894 convention, the organization unequivocally endorsed the necessity of serving as a bulwark for the Republic against a resurgence of those seeking a union of throne and altar. It was declared that the Republic should be entrusted to those who had facilitated its emergence. Furthermore, it was famously stated that "Freemasonry is nothing other than the Republic in disguise, just as the Republic is nothing other than Freemasonry undisguised". Despite the Republican victory, it was maintained that continued commitment was indispensable for the Republic's sustainability. (Note: Morlat 2019, p. 180)

=== Recruitment and sociology ===
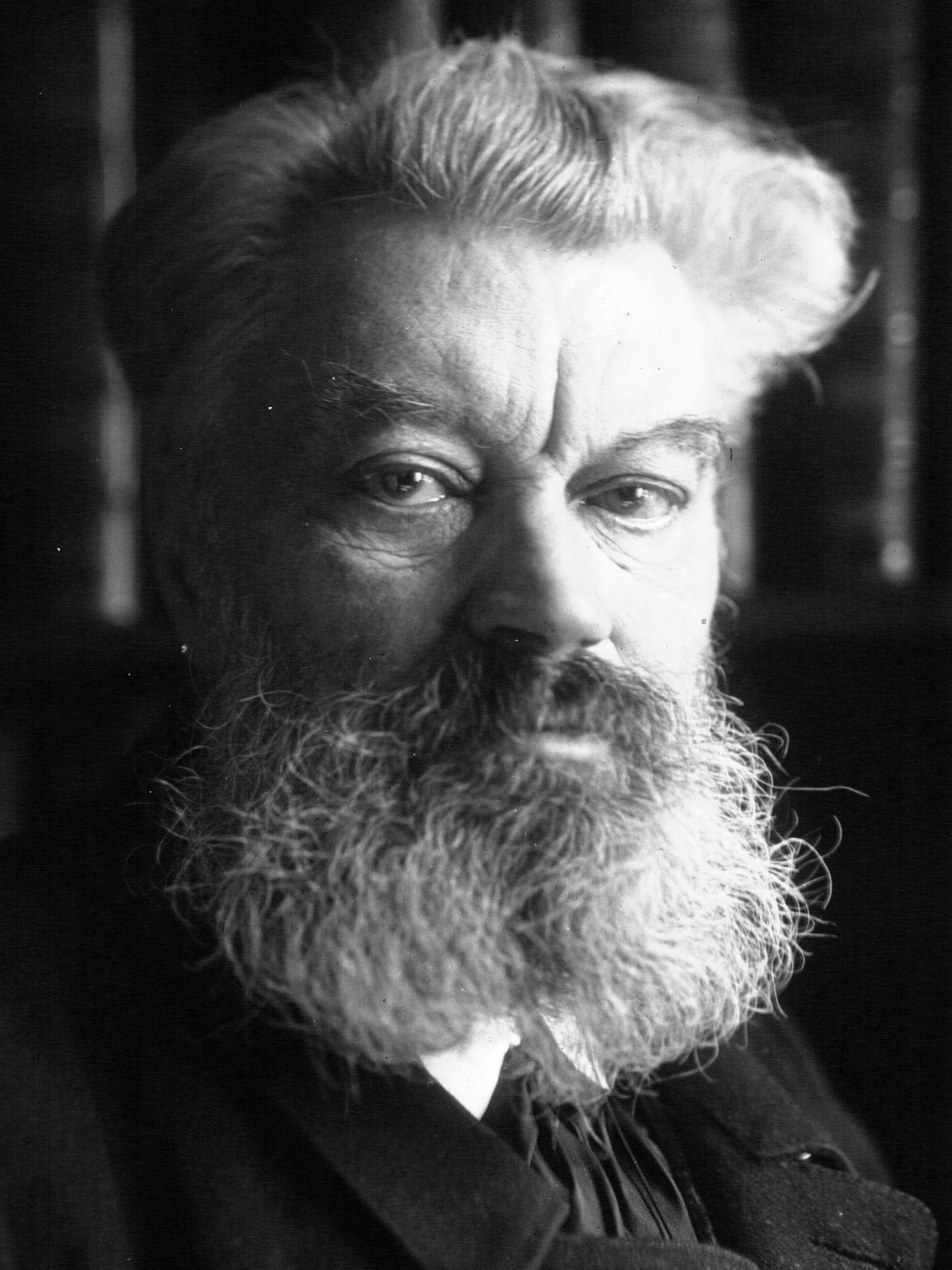
Camille Pelletan, founding member of the Radical Party.

The expansion of Freemasonry's membership and the increase in its numbers were closely correlated with the definitive victory of the Republic in 1877. During this period, the majority of members of the Grand Orient of France were drawn from the petite and middle bourgeoisie, including artisans, merchants, lawyers, journalists, and teachers, in addition to a few businessmen, engineers, and civil servants. The Grand Orient was active in its recruitment efforts targeting teachers and the military, sectors that had been heavily influenced by Catholicism for many years. While recruitment among teachers became significant starting in 1888, (Note: The 1898 convention received 21 delegates from lodges, all of whom were school directors or teachers.) recruitment within the military was much less substantial. Despite a slight increase in Freemason soldiers, the 1904 "affair of the cards" revealed that the army and navy remained traditional conservative bastions.

Additionally, the expansion of recruitment was reflected in the relationships established between Freemasonry and the liberal political tendencies of the time, particularly Republican parties that ranged from moderate to the extreme left. The ideological evolution of the Grand Orient between 1890 and 1900 resulted in a notable shift in the Order's composition, with Radical Republicans becoming the majority. Camille Pelletan, a member of the lodge La Clémente Amitié, was responsible for developing the Radical Party. The newspaper La Justice, which was directed by Georges Clemenceau (not a Freemason), promoted the party's program, which included the separation of church and state, income tax, and constitutional reform as its main objectives. In June 1901, the inaugural congress of the "Radical-Socialist Republican Party" was convened at the initiative of Gustave Mesureur, a dignitary of the Grande Loge de France, and Léon Bourgeois, a member of the Grand Orient. Although the Grand Orient's constitutions prohibited lodges from joining a political party in their official capacity, a circular issued on May 18, 1903, permitted members of the Order to form external groups to address economic and social issues. Consequently, numerous leaders and activists within the Radical Party were Freemasons affiliated with one of the two principal French obediences. A fruitful collaboration emerged between discussions held in Masonic lodges or conventions and the themes debated in Radical congresses.

The majority of Radical Freemasons within the Grand Orient were members of the petite bourgeoisie and asserted an ideological lineage tracing back to the ideals of the French Revolution. However, two distinct trends emerged. The initial, more moderate faction endorsed a liberal and individualistic ideology while simultaneously supporting reforms. The second trend allied with socialists to achieve shared goals through legal avenues. During the 1890s and early 1900s, most members in Masonic lodges were Radical Freemasons. However, a few socialist figures, such as Marcel Sembat and Arthur Groussier, were also members of the Order. The growing influence of socialism in the nation's political life led to an increase in the number of socialists joining Masonic lodges, particularly those belonging to the liberal branches of Freemasonry. These lodges sought to establish left-wing unity and alliances, which resulted in a significant number of socialists becoming Freemasons and the various political tendencies intermingling within the lodges of the obediences.

=== Political engagement ===
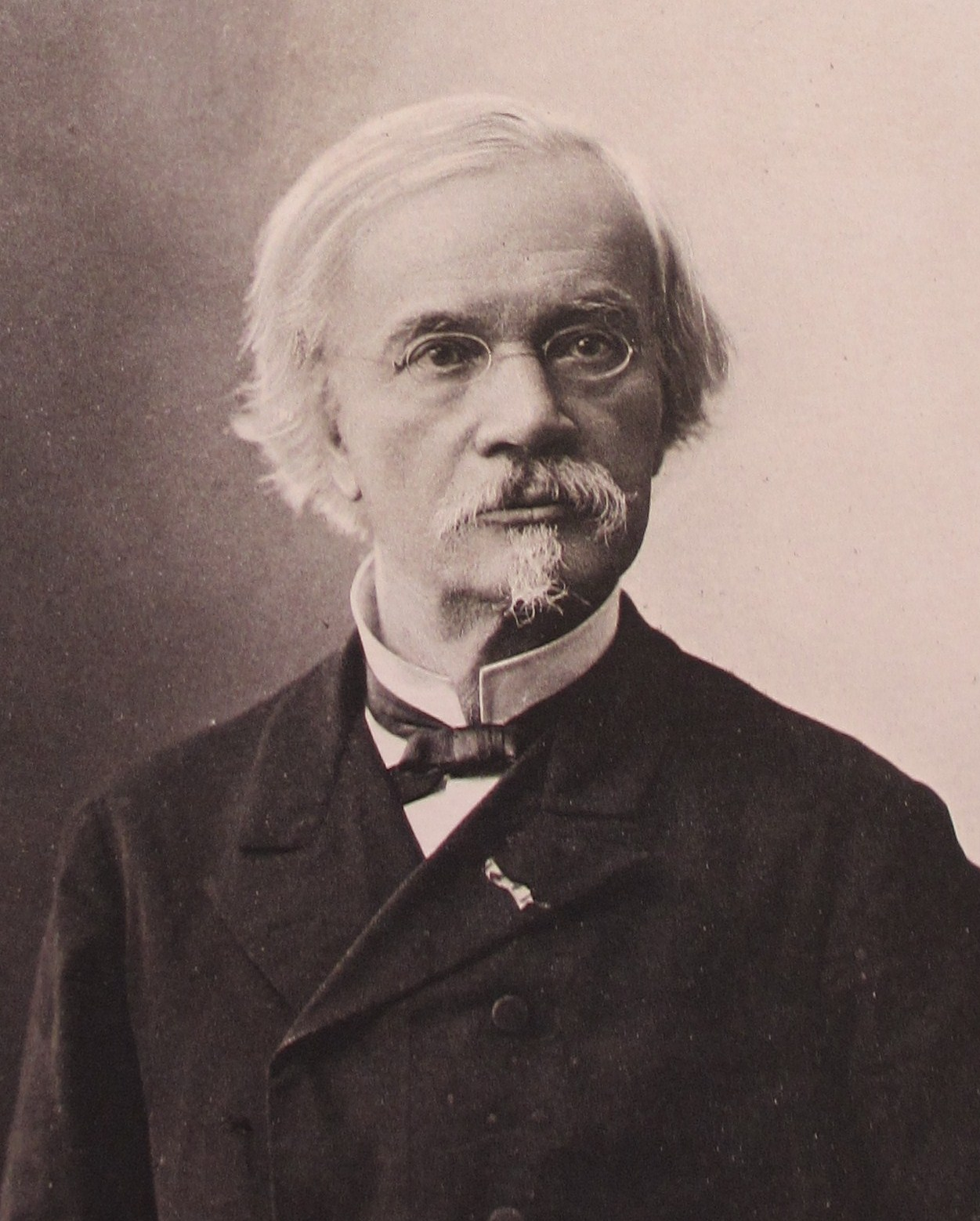
Jean-Claude Colfavru, author of a reflection on the involvement of Freemasons in society.

The philosophical and political evolution of the Grand Orient of France naturally gave rise to questions concerning the role of Freemasonry in the nascent Republic. In 1885, Jean-Claude Colfavru, a Freemason and lawyer, reflected on this in his work, On the Mission of Freemasonry in Our Homeland, France. He posited that Freemasons should engage in civic life, perpetuating the tradition of combating the enemies of liberty, science, and what he described as the "narrow sacerdotal spirit" that obstructed knowledge. (Note: Morlat 2019, p. 171) The Grand Orient's 1884 constitution included principles promoting societal action, which members interpreted during the 1889 convention as a call to move beyond purely speculative activities. (Note: Morlat 2019, p. 172)

Notwithstanding these stances, the principle of Masonic apoliticism continues to enjoy considerable support within the Order's general assemblies. This is evidenced by the issuance of reminders concerning constitutional articles that prohibit political or religious debates, which could potentially lead to divisions among members. This position is further reinforced by the arguments put forth by Jean Macé, who asserts that there is no discernible positive outcome for the Order in direct political involvement. Nevertheless, this viewpoint is countered by notable Freemasons such as Severiano de Heredia, who supports Freemasonry's involvement in matters about education, assistance, and solidarity. However, the composition of the Council of the Order reflects significant political involvement by its members, with many councilors holding key positions in both the Chamber of Deputies and the Senate. (Note: Morlat 2019, p. 174) These new orientations are also shared by the Grande Loge de France, though with less intensity, which has resulted in internal divisions. In response, several lodges have left this obedience, citing the abandonment of traditional initiatory practices and personal improvement in favor of political involvement.

At the Grand Orient convention of 1893, a lengthy debate ensued concerning the role of Freemasonry in politics. Although the question of the Order's involvement in public affairs appeared to have been resolved, the lodges insisted on the establishment of a clear and effective operational framework. A circular was issued, inviting lodges and members to engage in the upcoming electoral campaign. However, the refusal to select or endorse a candidate persisted, with the argument being made that respect for the political views of members must be upheld. (Note: Morlat 2019, p. 175) The triumph of the Republican Party and the Socialist Party in the 1893 legislative elections led the Order to articulate a clear social orientation while refusing to "endorse" candidates in elections. The Grand Orient's political action, still within the framework defined by the 1893 convention, involved the introduction of reform themes studied in the lodges, which were then implemented through votes in parliamentary assemblies by elected members. (Note: Morlat 2019, p. 176) This form of engagement, which stated that lodges should not join political parties but that only elected members should do so to advance the programs debated in the lodges, was reiterated by a circular on May 22, 1907. (Note: Morlat 2019, p. 177) Accordingly, a program of issues studied in the lodges—whose themes are proposed at the conclusion of each convention, debated in regional congresses, and then synthesized at the subsequent annual convention for the purpose of ratifying the final report—has resulted in legislative follow-up for numerous issues. In Manuel d'histoire de la franc-maçonnerie française [Manual of the History of French Freemasonry], Gaston Martin offers a critique of the hierarchical method employed by the Order, which he characterizes as a system of a "consultative committee of the Republic". This method consists of three levels: the lodge, the congress, and the convention. Martin's perspective is not unanimous, however, as some have denounced this approach as an "occult dictatorship of ideologues' committees". Starting in 1890, issues that were initially discussed within the context of the lodges began to gain legislative traction. These issues were first debated at the convention and then presented to the legislative assembly. (Note: Morlat 2019, p. 185)

=== Advancement of the social idea ===
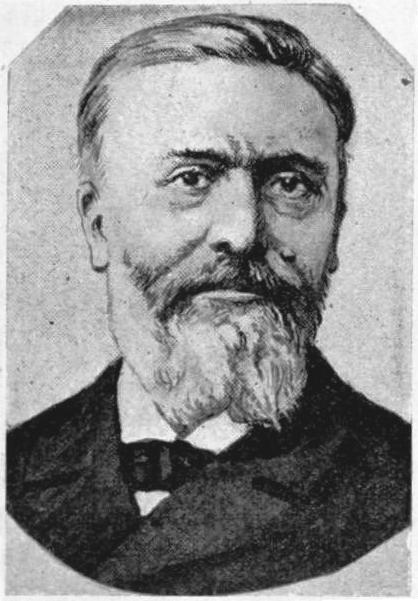
Frédéric Desmons, Grand Master of the Grand Orient, hostile to the clergy's influence on social issues.

Since its inception in France, the Order of Freemasonry has been engaged in philanthropic endeavors, particularly in the domain of welfare and social services. These actions are of particular importance during periods of authoritarian rule. The fraternity and affection for humanity inherent to Masonic ideology are manifested through these endeavors. The theme of the struggle for progress, rooted in this tradition and became apparent during the liberal years of the Second Empire, emerged as early as 1848. In that year, an article in the journal Le Franc-Maçon posited that it is the responsibility of Freemasonry to provide solutions to the country's most pressing social issues, particularly those pertaining to labor organization. (Note: Morlat 2019, p. 191) In the 1870s, Léonide Babaud-Laribière similarly underscored the significance of pursuing social advancement, particularly through the establishment of cooperatives and credit institutions. (Note: Morlat 2019, p. 192) The opposition to clericalism further underscored the intention to address social issues in the context of the emerging social Catholicism of Albert de Mun and René de La Tour du Pin, who had established 400 committees by 1884. This situation prompted Frédéric Desmons, Grand Master of the Grand Orient, to highlight the increasing alignment between the Catholic Church and the socialist movement. He then advocated for a countervailing force to challenge this emerging center of clericalism. In 1885, he reaffirmed the threat posed by the expansion of the clergy's influence, driven by the new social policy introduced by Pope Leo XIII. (Note: Chevallier 1975, p. 136)

The subjects addressed by Masonic lodges, beginning in 1885, were predominantly economic and social. New lodges with evocative names began to emerge, such as the lodge "The Social Problem", which dedicated its work to the issue of social inequality. From 1890, a majority of lodge members supported socialist ideas, with some reservations about freedom and private property. (Note: Chevallier 1975, p. 137) The objective of these reforms was to improve the living conditions of citizens in French society and to establish a "social Republic" based on equity. Several projects were thus promoted by Freemasonry.

=== Role in social and fiscal action ===
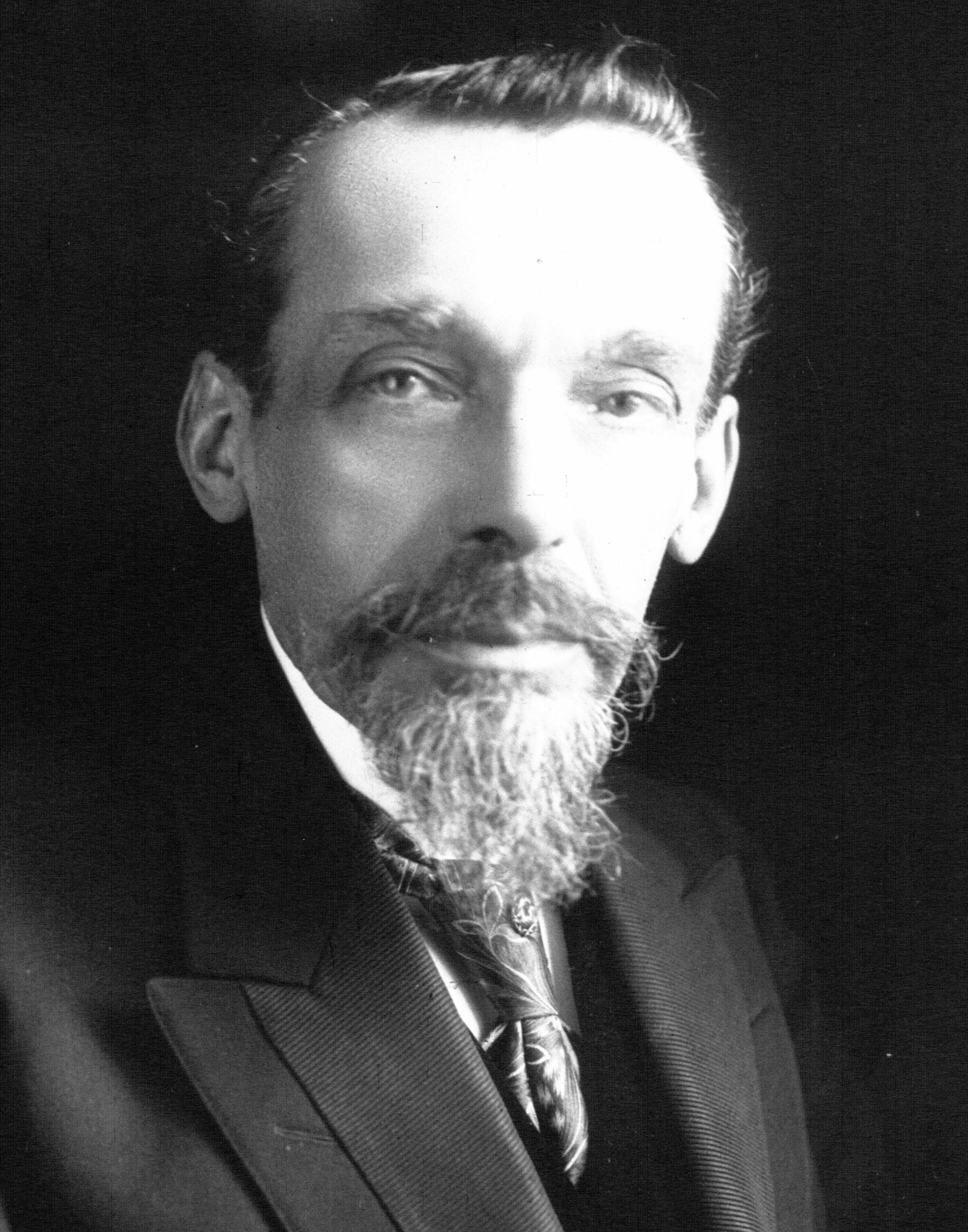
Gustave Mesureur, who initiated a project to set up a national pension fund.

As early as 1875, there was a discernible shift in focus towards the role of social legislation and the efforts of Freemasons in addressing the challenges faced by disadvantaged communities. The Masonic publication La Chaîne d'Union published several articles proposing the establishment of a national organization for the provision of assistance to children, the sick, the disabled, and the elderly. In 1880, Gustave Mesureur encouraged the lodges to consider the establishment of a national pension fund. (Note: Chevallier 1975, p. 143) In 1898, the Grand Orient once again addressed the issue of health and old age insurance at its convention. Most lodges expressed support for a tripartite organization and funding model involving the state, employers, and employees. The convention approved these proposals and encouraged Freemason parliamentarians to use their influence to push for a law in this regard.

Despite the absence of a monopoly on social proposals, members of Masonic orders were active participants in the advancement of women's and children's rights. This was evidenced by their support for the 1910 law on workers' and peasants' pensions, which was also endorsed by Abbés Lemire and Gayraud. In 1899, Alfred Faure interceded at the convent, requesting that the lodges examine the working conditions of children in orphanages, convents, and other institutions that provided care for underprivileged children. Subsequently, Freemason deputy Eugène Fournière denounced the "exploitation" of children in certain religious institutions in parliament. (Note: First, Eugène Fournière mentions the Catholic orphanage of Bon Pasteur in Nancy.) Additionally, inquiries were initiated concerning the issue of alcoholism and its impact on crime and education, as well as on a reform of the criminal code.

New provisions that enriched social legislation were discussed in the lodges and convents of Masonic orders. These included the 11-hour workday in 1900, mandatory Sunday rest in 1906, and the creation of a Ministry of Labor. The proposed laws were introduced by Freemasons Gaston Doumergue and René Viviani. (Note: Chevallier 1975, p. 145) In a somewhat eclectic manner, several initiatives were presented to legislators to propose economic and social reforms. In 1910, proposals were put forth to regulate apprenticeships, reduce rural depopulation, and reform the Code of Criminal Procedure. In 1911, a draft law for retirement at age 65 was debated in the lodges, along with proposals to combat prostitution, support large families, and fight alcoholism. (Note: Morlat 2019, p. 195) However, the initiators of reforms in various fields were not solely Freemasons. Socialists and liberal Catholics also participated in the study and legislative translation of social progress through their respective organizations.

In 1891, a circular from the Grand Orient proposed the undertaking of a dozen reflections to formulate a comprehensive tax reform. This reform addressed the redistribution of wealth created throughout society, as well as the financing of social reforms and public charges, directly. (Note: Morlat 2019, p. 194) After protracted and contentious deliberations, the principle of progressive taxation was ultimately embraced. These disagreements resulted in several legislative failures, including in the Senate, despite the majority of Freemason senators. It was not until the advent of World War I that income tax was incorporated into the country's fiscal legislation. (Note: Chevallier 1975, p. 146) Following the conclusion of the war, the country's depleted financial resources rekindled the debate within the lodges on fiscal reforms designed to restore the nation's finances. The Grand Orient lodges' remit was not solely taxation-related; it encompassed proposals for reforms in the economy and finances, including public debt, war damages, inheritance tax, and inter-allied debts. By 1924, all proposals were aligned with the program of the left-wing coalition. (Note: Morlat 2019, p. 723)

=== Role in electoral and union action ===
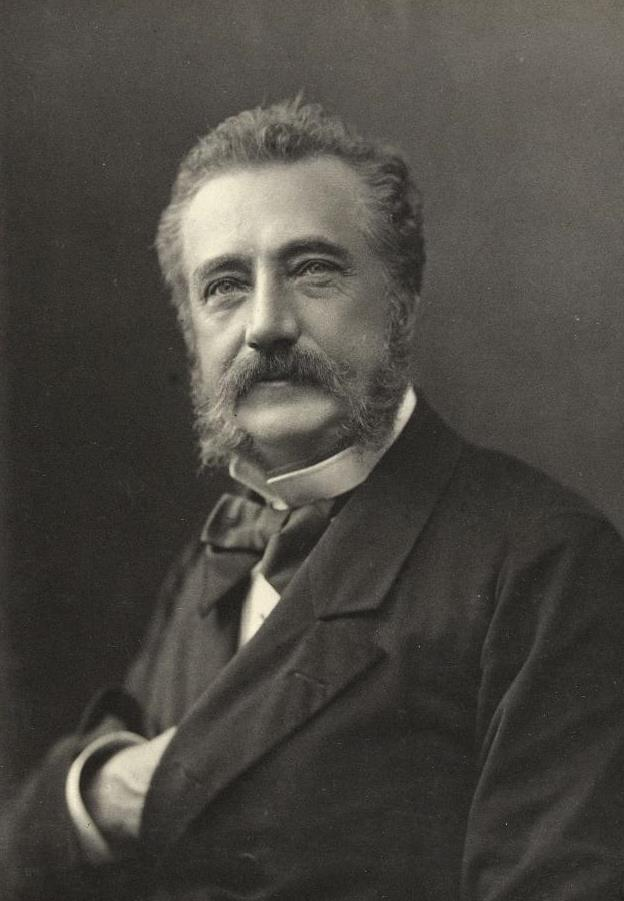
Eugène Delattre, lawyer in favor of proportional representation for elected representatives.

The issue of the voting system was first broached within Freemasonry during the liberal period of the Second Empire. At that time, lawyer Eugène Delattre proposed a series of reforms that would eventually lead to the introduction of proportional representation for elected officials and a greater legitimacy of popular representation. (Note: Chevallier 1975, p. 148) By the conclusion of the 19th century, the subject had become a topic of discussion within Freemasonry. The culmination of the work from several lodges, including that of Antoine Blatin, a staunch proponent of proportional representation, led the 1898 Grand Orient Convent to put the adoption of this electoral system to a vote. (Note: Chevallier 1975, p. 149) Following debate with proponents of the district-based system, which offered enhanced political prospects, the convent adopted the report from the assembly president (Note: The assembly is presided over by Antoine Blatin. (Note: Chevallier 1975, p. 150)) and urged the republican parties to prioritize this proposal in their political platform. The Grand Lodge of France initiated comparable deliberations in 1905.

The question of the voting system was the subject of debate in 1912. However, the Senate, whose majority was in favor of the district-based system, rejected the proposal. In 1914, the Assembly voted once more at the request of Arthur Groussier. However, the debate in the Senate was postponed due to the outbreak of World War I. Ultimately, the Senate adopted the proportional representation and list voting proposal, which applied to the elections of November 1919. The result of these elections served to reinforce the position of Freemasons who were opposed to this system, with the election of numerous parliamentarians who were regarded as reactionary and a loss of seats for those on the left of the political spectrum. In 1924, the Grand Orient called for a return to the single-member district voting system, which was regarded as a more opportunistic mode with a clear political interest and seen as a defense of the Republic. The Chamber voted for this return in 1928, and the legislative elections of 1928, 1932, and 1936 used this system exclusively. (Note: Chevallier 1975, p. 151)

The interest of Freemasons in trade unionism first emerged in 1883, with the advocacy of the establishment of joint trade chambers between workers and employers, the promotion of arbitration as a means of conflict resolution, and the proposal of the creation of a Ministry of Industry with a primary focus on workers' unions. (Note: Chevallier 1975, p. 165) The Grand Orient took significant action in this area to influence social progress while avoiding the potential influence of religious institutions. In 1910, the convent endorsed a strengthening of the role of trade unions, proposing a specific course of action. (Note: Morlat 2019, p. 198) The convent asserted that the role of the unions was not to prepare the working class for an anti-capitalist revolution but to engage in peaceful work aimed at educating the working segments of the population, ultimately leading to the evolution of the republican regime. Consequently, the extension of the civil competence of unions and the right of civil servants to unionize could facilitate the replacement of authoritarian state management with joint and participatory management by creating a Ministry of Labor. (Note: Morlat 2019, p. 199)

=== Role in the evolution of civil rights ===
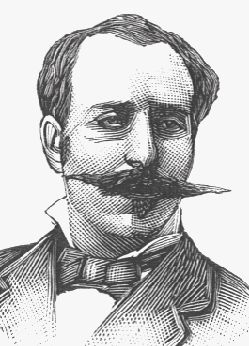
Antoine Blatin, one of the leading figures in the crematist movement in favor of the right to cremate the dead.

French Freemasons have historically demonstrated a profound commitment to the cremation movement. Despite numerous attempts to legalize cremation, the French government consistently rejected these proposals before the establishment of the Third Republic. (Note: Pierrat & Kupferman 2020, p. 213) The concept, however, gained traction in Europe, particularly in Germany, a Protestant country more receptive to diverse funeral practices. This was also the case in Italy, where a cremation movement, widely endorsed by Masonic organizations, gained prominence in 1860. (Note: Pierrat & Kupferman 2020, p. 150) Giuseppe Garibaldi, "Italy's first Freemason", specified in his will that he be cremated. (Note: Upon his death in 1882, a family council, facing public pressure, ultimately decided to bury him. (Note: Pierrat & Kupferman 2020, p. 151))

In France, in 1883, a new proposal, endorsed by numerous Freemason parliamentarians and a petition bearing 5,000 signatures, was repudiated by the Chamber of Deputies. Antoine Blatin, who would later become Grand Master of the Grand Orient of France, played a pivotal role in the legalization of cremation in France. He presented an amendment to the Chamber during the debate on the freedom of civil funerals. (Note: Pierrat & Kupferman 2020, p. 155) This amendment permitted individuals to select their method of burial. The amendment was adopted by the Chamber and subsequently ratified by the Senate, which only removed the term "cremation" from the regulatory text. The law that legalized cremation was definitively passed in October 1887. (Note: Pierrat & Kupferman 2020, p. 156)

The earliest known legal texts authorizing divorce are dated September 20, 1792. During the French Revolution, Freemason deputies Jean-Baptiste Louis Ducastel and Louis Antoine Joseph Robin were responsible for initiating the first law, which, in its first article, specified that "marriage is dissolved by divorce." (Note: Pierrat & Kupferman 2020, p. 112) While the Napoleonic Code retained provisions for divorce by mutual consent, subsequent modifications rendered it considerably more challenging to obtain. The Restoration of the monarchy, which reinstated Catholicism as the state religion and regarded divorce as "a revolutionary poison", resulted in the abolition of divorce laws through the Bonald law of 1816. (Note: Pierrat & Kupferman 2020, p. 113) In 1848, Adolphe Crémieux endeavored to legalize divorce once more, but his proposal was ultimately dismissed by a commission tasked with examining the matter. Alfred Naquet was instrumental in rekindling the discourse on divorce through his unwavering dedication and resolve. His Masonic affiliation was utilized by the Catholic anti-Masonic movement as a means of disseminating propaganda against divorce. (Note: Pierrat & Kupferman 2020, p. 115) He was tireless in his efforts for divorce, publishing a controversial book, Religion, Property, Family, which proposed free unions and denounced the indissolubility of marriage as an infringement on liberty. After multiple political engagements, a law that reinstated the legality of divorce was passed on July 27, 1884. However, this law was less liberal than the 1792 text, as it did not reinstate divorce by mutual consent. (Note: Pierrat & Kupferman 2020, p. 117)

The concept of freedom of association originated with the French Revolution and was enshrined in law on August 21, 1790. However, it was not long before it came under challenge. The First Empire was particularly suspicious of all gatherings and, through Article 291 of the criminal code, imposed penalties on any gathering of more than twenty people without prior authorization. The subsequent regimes were similarly undemocratic, and Article 291 remained in force until the collapse of the July Monarchy. (Note: Pierrat & Kupferman 2020, p. 102) The provisional government of the Second Republic, which included numerous Freemasons, reaffirmed this right through the enactment of a comprehensive and liberal statute. However, due to its overly vague drafting, the text was ultimately abandoned, (Note: Pierrat & Kupferman 2020, p. 103) and the implementing decrees were never promulgated. At the beginning of the 20th century, the Waldeck-Rousseau government included this liberalization in its broader strategy to combat the influence of religious congregations and advance the secularization of institutions. Following lengthy debates and persistent engagement, the repeal of Article 291 was achieved on July 1, 1901, with the enactment of the law on freedom of association. (Note: Pierrat & Kupferman 2020, p. 107) This legislation was notably permissive with regard to associations and markedly restrictive with respect to congregations, which were subjected to an exceptional regulatory framework imposing a series of constraints, intricate authorizations, and monitoring. (Note: Morlat 2019, p. 8130)

== Secularization of the state and society ==
The triumph of the Republican Party prompted the Order to pursue the implementation of its positivist initiatives within French society. As espoused by Freemasons, the success of this endeavor was contingent upon the secularization of the state and society, coupled with an active secularism that sought to eradicate all metaphysical conceptions. While espousing the principles of intellectual freedom and religious tolerance, the campaign was conducted "against all superstitions", particularly those associated with organized religion, most notably Catholicism. One year after the vote at the Grand Orient of France, which removed the requirement of belief in God to access its lodges, anticlericalism became more widespread within the Order. The 1878 Convent confirmed this direction and incorporated it into the battle for societal renewal. Clericalism was identified as a threat to be eradicated, characterized as "ignorance and fanaticism" and positioned as reactionary. French Freemasonry subsequently defined itself as a barrier against those who opposed the Lights and progress, portraying supporters of the "clerical party" as "crusaders against the Republic and its government". Accusations were levied against the clergy of all factions for practicing "religious obscurantism" and opposing democracy.

The approach thus formulated and expressed effectively positioned Freemasons within a framework that respected the laws and rights of citizens, while also addressing the challenges posed by reactionaries. Gradually, a climate of civil war emerged in French society, reminiscent of the Wars of Religion. However, this time the conflict was not between Catholics and Protestants, but rather between those who upheld religious dogma and those who advocated free thought. (Note: Morlat 2019, p. 125) In this context, the Scottish Rite Grand Lodge occasionally exhibited a more strident stance, diverging from the main obedience and critiquing its tepid approach to the country's secularization, a project that had emerged as a defining feature of the "war of the two Frances" that had become a prominent feature of public discourse since the Revolution.

From the 1890s onward, the new social doctrine of the Church, promoted by Pope Leo XIII through the encyclical Rerum Novarum, was perceived by Freemasons as a potential threat to liberty and democracy, with the capacity to jeopardize the future of the Republic. Additionally, the new doctrine was denounced as a "competing peril" for Freemasonry, with the clerical action "hiding behind a facade of secularism". (Note: Morlat 2019, p. 109) The confrontation with the clergy extended beyond support for the Republic and aimed to make education free, secular, and compulsory while banning religious congregations. Subsequently, this confrontation crystallized around the purification of the civil service of clerical elements and, ultimately, the complete and final separation of Church and State.

=== Secular and free education ===
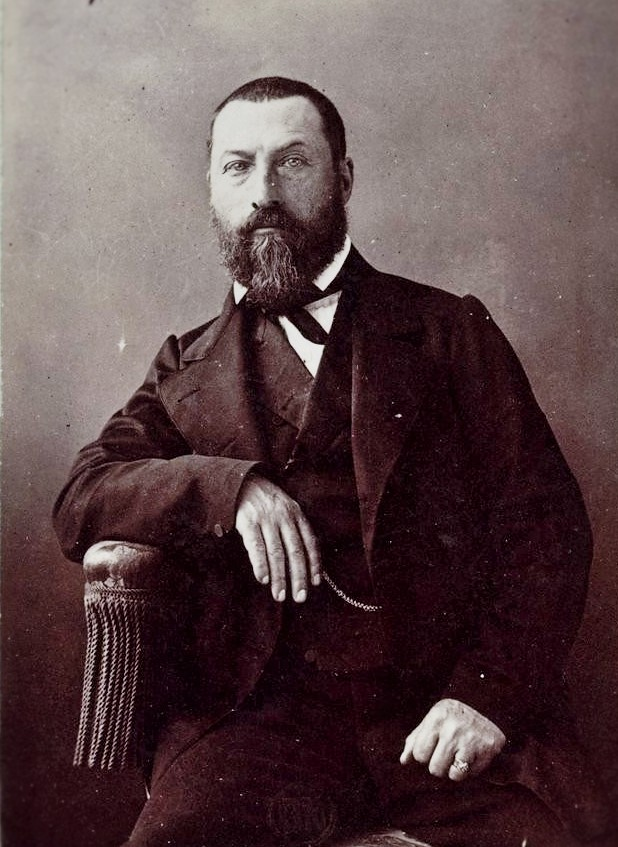
Jean Macé, founder of the League of Education.

This project is aligned with the tenets of the Lights movement and the philosophies of 18th-century thinkers. It represents a core aspect of Freemasonry's imaginative realm, which strives to facilitate accessible avenues for knowledge and learning for all. From 1870 onwards, Freemasonry devoted a significant amount of its efforts to the establishment of free schools, which were to be independent of the control of religious congregations. The approach is frequently referred to as the "Unified School", and it was driven by two key motives. (Note: Morlat 2019, p. 139) The initial concept is philosophical and can be defined as a translation of the term "light", which symbolizes the acquisition of knowledge and the development of discernment, leading to the emergence of independent thought. This freedom of thought is established through public education based on science, morality, and knowledge. (Note: Morlat 2019, p. 140) The second is political: access to instruction alone does not allow certain social classes to attain higher education. This difficulty, which effectively perpetuates an unequal system that favors the bourgeoisie and blocks social mobility, risks leading to a proletarian revolution, which Freemasons generally wish to avoid. (Note: Morlat 2019, p. 141)

By extending their support to the League of Education, an initiative spearheaded by Jean Macé, the Freemasons demonstrate their commitment by launching a series of initiatives, including subscriptions and petitions, which garner significant support. (Note: Morlat 2019, p. 142) The debate within the lodges focuses on establishing free and compulsory education or creating schools directly dependent on Masonic orders. However, the necessary resources for such an undertaking are not readily available, and the proposal is repeatedly rejected. The demand for public and free schools is one of the most frequently discussed topics at the conventions of the Grand Orient. (Note: Morlat 2019, p. 144) One of the primary justifications put forth by the dominant faction in favor of this is pacifism and the prohibition of both international and civil war. The advancement of society through the education of the populace, which allows for the evolution of society and their enlightened participation in advancing the condition of workers and peasants, free from religious obscurantism and ignorance, would prevent them from engaging in revolutionary acts that serve their adversaries, thereby promoting a peaceful evolution of republican society. (Note: Morlat 2019, pp. 146–147)

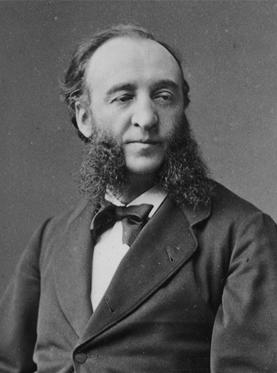
Jules Ferry, promoter of free, secular education.

Jules Ferry was initiated into Freemasonry in 1875 at the lodge "La Clémente Amitié", where he was introduced to Émile Littré. Ferry subsequently became Minister of Public Instruction in 1879 and passed the law on August 9 of that year, which established primary teacher training colleges with the objective of training teachers who would replace the priests of religious congregations. (Note: Morlat 2019, p. 149) In the same year, he appointed Ferdinand Buisson to oversee primary education and revoked the right to confer university degrees from private institutions. He initiated the initial assault on religious congregations. (Note: Morlat 2019, p. 241) Between 1880 and 1885, several legislative acts were passed to make education free and compulsory. The curriculum excluded religious instruction, and unauthorized congregations were largely excluded from public education. (Note: Morlat 2019, p. 151) The law of October 30, 1886, completed the secularization of public education by mandating the secularization of public school personnel.

The Grand Orient was closely followed in its political efforts on this subject, which were celebrated during the convention of the same year with a motion of support. Masonic lodges claim the paternity of these laws, viewing them as the culmination of many efforts surrounding issues discussed within their ranks since the Second Empire.

Six years after their enactment, the laws about secular education continued to face challenges in their implementation across the territory. At the Grand Orient convention of 1892, interventions were made to highlight the persistence of religious instruction in public schools, despite the circular from the Minister of Public Instruction, Léon Bourgeois, which banned such practices. The Freemasons exerted increasing pressure to enforce the laws and eliminate any remaining religious elements in schools. Those teachers who failed to comply with the laws were subjected to intense criticism. The lodges subsequently sought to prohibit any member of a religious congregation, even those in possession of a teaching certificate, from engaging in teaching activities (Note: Many clergy members obtained the diploma required by the 1880 Grévy law, which made it mandatory, thus allowing them to remain in primary education. (Note: Morlat 2019, pp. 150–151)) and to abolish the Falloux law. (Note: Morlat 2019, p. 152) Religious education was effectively privatized, and the provision of civic and moral instruction was extended to all levels of public education. (Note: Morlat 2019, p. 155) Further legislative reforms were discussed, including the state's takeover of all religious property for allocation to higher education. This would be provided in new universities with entry based on examinations for both professors and students. The aim was to create a true republican meritocracy. (Note: Morlat 2019, p. 153) These proposals were primarily designed to exclude religious congregations and Catholic personnel from public education. They received a partial response in 1900: although the Falloux law was not repealed, a circular based on the law of October 30, 1886, reaffirmed the ban on teachers holding positions in the service of the Church.

=== Cleaning up the civil service ===
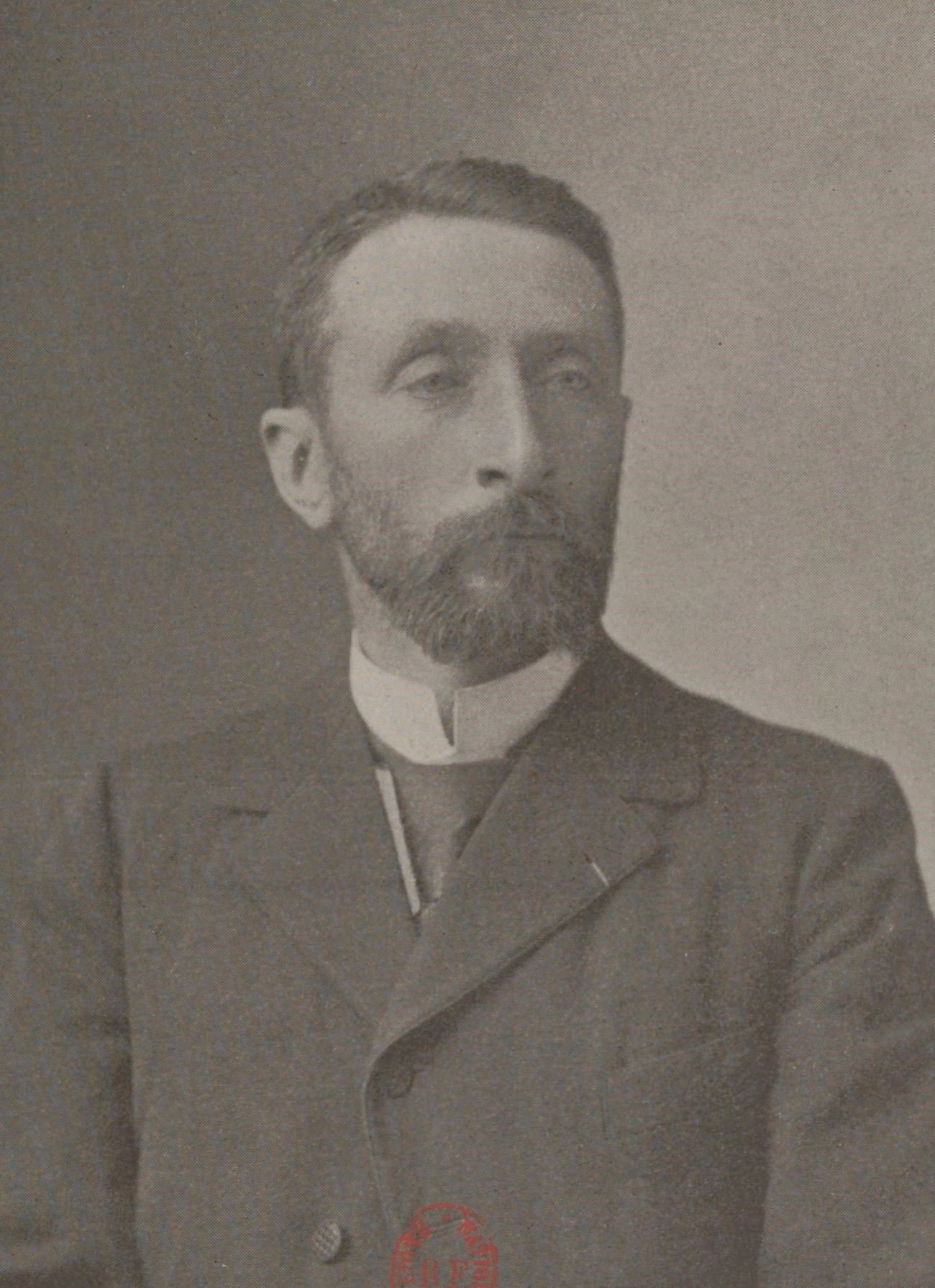
Fernand Faure, in favor of eliminating all religious influence in institutions.

The process of secularization in the context of public education was also accompanied by proposals from Freemasons to exclude individuals who were not part of the republican apparatus from the French civil service. (Note: Morlat 2019, p. 157) For Masonic ideals to prevail in society, it was necessary for constituted bodies to cooperate or, at the very least, refrain from impeding their progress. (Note: Morlat 2019, p. 182) The resolutions from the lodges were presented at the Grand Orient convention, wherein the necessity of a gradual purification of the civil service was expressed. Only those officials who espoused the tenets of the republican ideology and demonstrated a commitment to secularism should be permitted to assume positions of authority. (Note: Morlat 2019, p. 183) The Moral Order alliance attempted on numerous occasions, during periods of governmental crisis, (Note: Especially during the governance of the "Moral Order" or the crisis of May 16, 1877.) to thwart the republican coalition, which included numerous Freemasons, and impede its efforts to secularize society. This viewpoint was met with opposition from Masonic anticlericalism, which was vocal and unwavering in its stance. It was even asserted that one could not simultaneously identify as both a republican and a Catholic. In the wake of Victor Courdevaux's writings and the numerous lectures he delivered at the lodge on the "political claims of the Church", other figures joined the fray, engaged in the fight for the secularization of the country's institutions. Some were more radical in their approach, extending their critiques to encompass all religions, including Catholic, Jewish, and Protestant, despite the tacit alliance between liberal Protestantism, led by Ferdinand Buisson or Frédéric Desmons, and Freemasonry. At the 1885 Grand Orient convention, Fernand Faure advocated for the removal of religious influence from institutions to facilitate the triumph of free thought. Beyond the purifying of the educational system, the lodges of the Grand Orient also demanded a reorganization of the state based on strict neutrality in religious or philosophical matters. They transmitted lengthy lists of demands to ministries and brothers elected to Republic institutions. (Note: Morlat 2019, p. 156)

=== Separation of Church and State ===
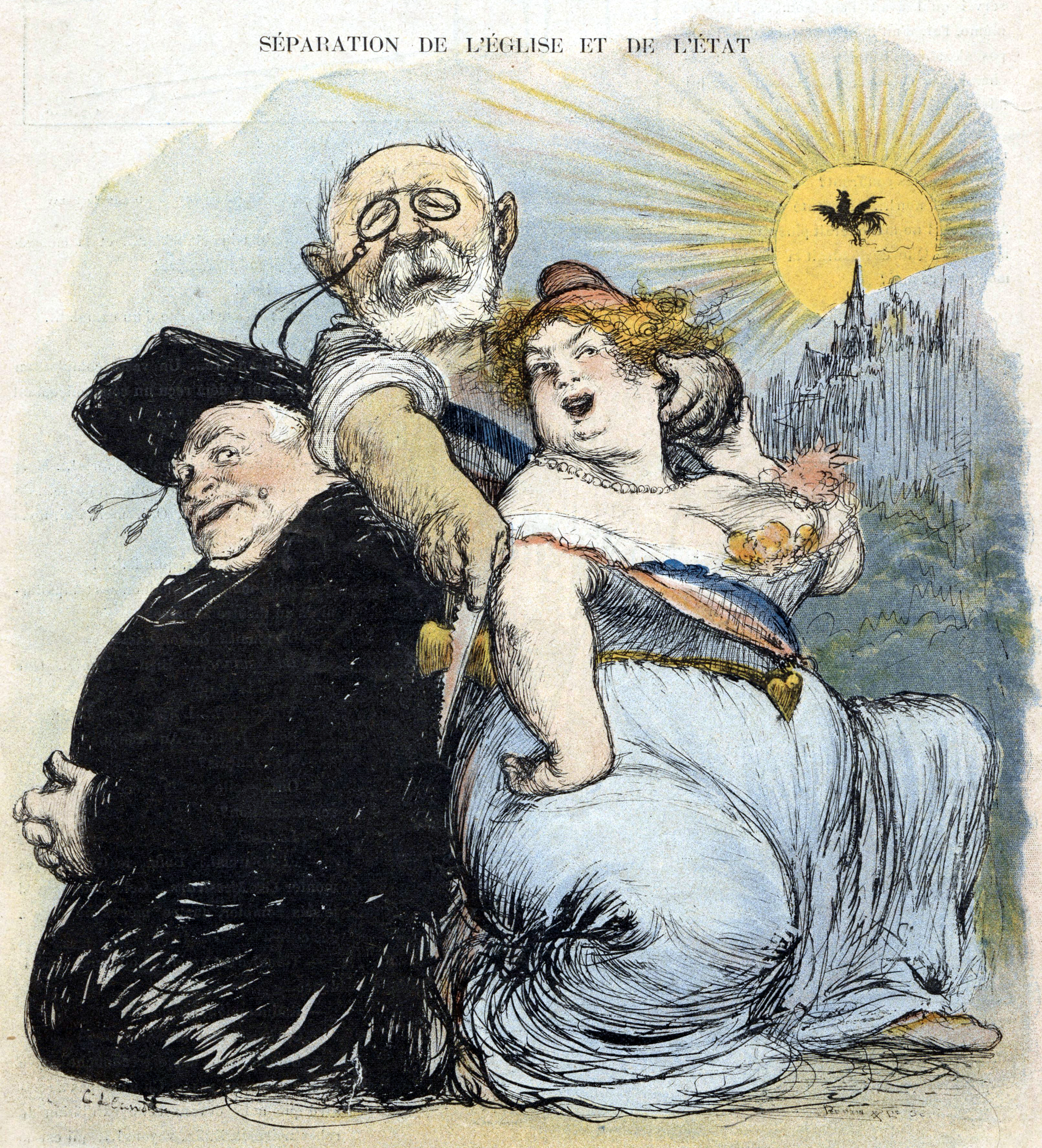
Cartoon published in Le Rire. Jean-Baptiste Bienvenu-Martin, Minister of Public Instruction in the Rouvier cabinet and a Freemason of the "La Clémente Amitié" lodge, cuts the link between Church and State (1905).

Masonic lodges played an instrumental role in the preparation of the project for the separation of Church and State, a pivotal act of secularization within the context of the Republic. This initiative resonated strongly with numerous elected officials who were Freemasons. To achieve this reform, it was necessary to gain broad support, given that the rural population was more often attached to Catholicism. All matters, both political and legal, were addressed with rationalism and rigor in the lodges' work. (Note: Morlat 2019, p. 111) The prevailing reflection in the workshops was based on the liberation from all dogma to make room for ideas established on science and philosophical tolerance. This was seen by Freemasons as the only means to allow for human progress in an ever-evolving world. The debates centered on the contrast between a "republic of eternal divinities" and a "republic of ideas". The former was seen as incompatible with the latter, and thus the separation of all churches and the state was advocated as a means of achieving the latter. In his speech at the 1885 convention, Auguste Dide presented the rationale and philosophical underpinnings of the lodges' reflections, emphasizing the primacy of fraternity over controversy during debates. His presentation asserted that the freedom of thought of Freemasons and the state they envisioned must be free from "retrograde and obscurantist principles" to make way for the evolution proposed by science, logic, and reason. (Note: Morlat 2019, p. 112) For the Grand Orient, the separation of Church and State is part of the legacy of the Revolution and the culmination of the Republic as a governing principle. (Note: Morlat 2019, p. 118)

The lodges' arguments also centered on the nature of the concordat regime, which established the relationship between various religions and the French state. The 1801 agreement between First Consul Bonaparte and the Holy See, subsequently extended by Napoleon to Protestant and Jewish religions, aimed to regulate authority through the allocation of state funding to all religions. (Note: Morlat 2019, p. 113) This enabled the Catholic Church, in particular, to gain a foothold in state institutions. (Note: Morlat 2019, p. 114) The fundamental issue at stake was whether the state should provide financial support for the tenets of various religions, while not extending such support to Freemasonry, which at the time claimed to be a "Church of the Republic", founded on reason, science, and fraternity. However, this debate on the financing of cults was not about seeking recognition or subsidies. Rather, it was about ensuring equal treatment between institutions. Once these subsidies were allocated to religions and doctrines that declared themselves superior to the state, science, and sometimes denigrated one another, the question of equal treatment was disrupted.

Those who advocate for the cult budget, whether in the Chamber of Deputies or the Senate, argue that subsidies to the clergy are a form of compensation for the property that the Church claims was seized during the Revolution. This argument was refuted in a report from the convention, which cited the laws of the Old Regime (Note: The Gallican system made the Church an institution subordinate to the King, since Louis XIV. (Note: Morlat 2019, p. 115)) that specified that Church property was royal property. The Grand Orient of France asserts that the Church is subject to the state, which has the authority to dispose of its property as it sees fit.

The terms of the separation were not unanimously agreed upon, and a variety of positions were taken within the Masonic orders. Émile Combes, the President of the Council, who was an ardent proponent of anticlerical legislation, held the view that the French populace was not yet prepared for the dissolution of the existing religious structures. (Note: In a speech to the Chamber in January, Émile Combes expresses his skepticism about the separation, considering the centuries when religion shaped minds. He believes that one cannot erase everything without offering a replacement religious model.) He put forth the concept of establishing a republican civil religion. Some Freemasons put forth the proposition of establishing a liberal Gallican Church. For others, however, the separation was merely a step toward an anti-religious state policy. The vote on the law was hindered by the so-called "Affair of the Cards", in which the Grand Orient of France was involved. It was finally passed on July 3 and December 9, 1905, in the Chamber of Deputies and the Senate. A significant number of parliamentary Freemasons voted for the text, while a minority voted against it, considering it too weak.

== Clerical reactions and anti-Masonry sentiments ==
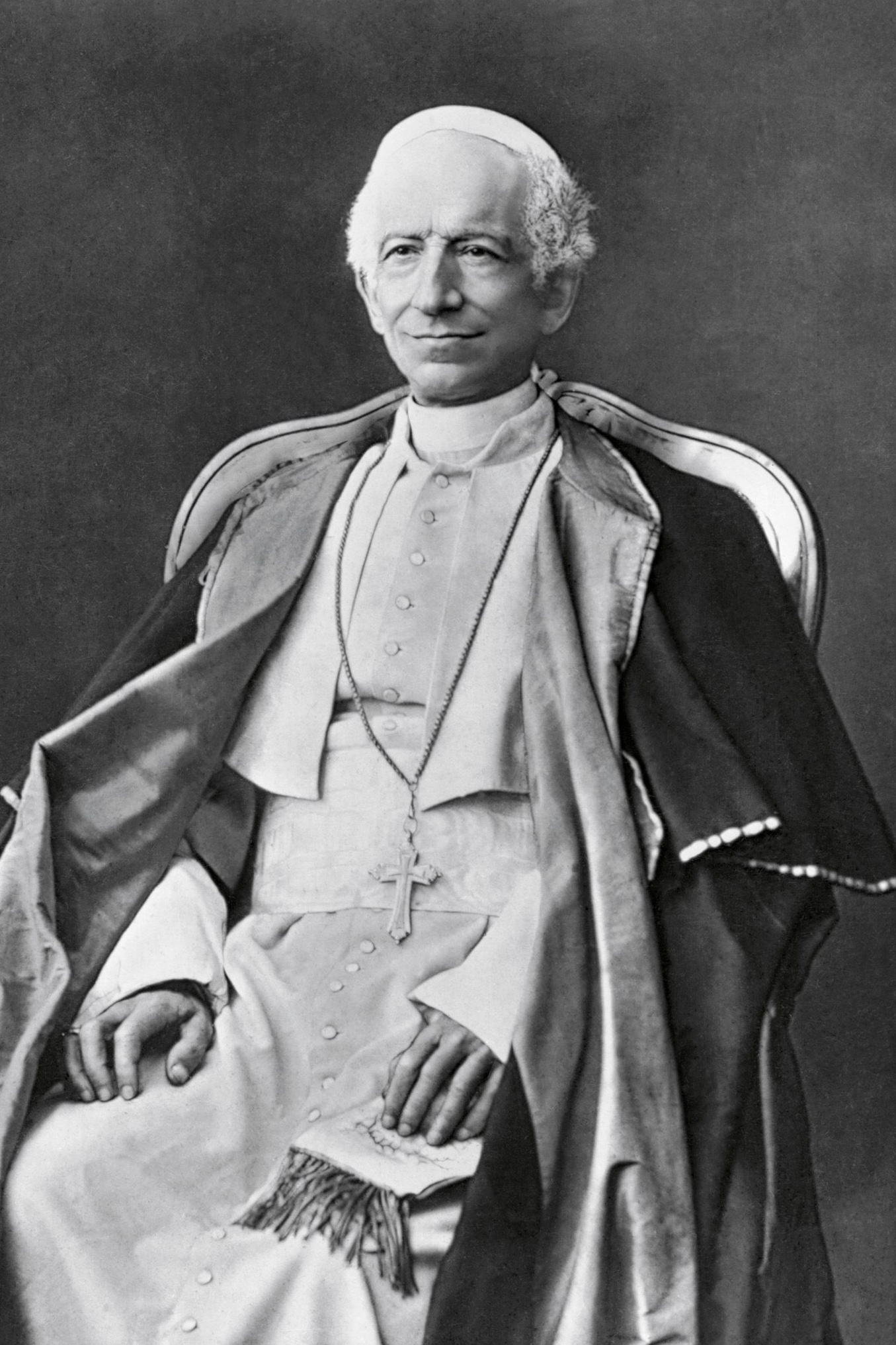
Pope Leo XIII in 1878.

The anti-Masonic movement has a longstanding presence within the Catholic Church, evident from the earliest papal bulls of 1738 and 1751, which mandate the excommunication of Freemasonry. The anti-Masonic movement underwent a radicalization at the advent of the Third Republic, coinciding with the intensification of anti-clericalism within Masonic orders. While the 18th-century papal bulls were not strictly adhered to by the regimes in power, which maintained a certain degree of neutrality, Pope Pius IX's speech before the College of Cardinals on September 25, 1865, made public on October 6, represents a renewed campaign against Freemasonry. The speech attempts to encourage European regimes to take action against this "perverse society of vulgar men [...] which has emerged for the common ruin of religion and society". This speech highlights the theme of Masonic secrecy and skillfully situates Freemasonry among the secret societies that incite revolutions. Despite the fact that Napoleon III does not act on this speech, the ultramontane press seizes upon the issue and amplifies the Pope's accusations.

Consequently, a considerable number of clergy members have published a multitude of circulars and articles that are critical of Freemasonry. On October 10 of the same year, the Bishop of Laval disseminated a circular letter denouncing secret societies and asserting the incompatibility of simultaneously belonging to the Catholic Church and Freemasonry. This action served to confirm the total rupture between the two entities. In an article published on October 27, Abbot Desorges shifts from condemnation on religious and political grounds to accusing Freemasonry of criminal activity. This is achieved by presenting passages from initiation rituals and removing their symbolic meaning. In February 1868, Cardinal de Bonald, Archbishop of Lyon, provided further clarification regarding the excommunication of Freemasons. He issued a pastoral letter that was notably critical and methodically addressed various historical and philosophical aspects of the Masonic order. The letter accused the Masonic order of engaging in immoral and impious practices. (Note: Morlat 2019, p. 101) In his 1884 encyclical Humanum genus, Pope Leo XIII reiterates the condemnations of the "sect" by his predecessors and ascribes a satanic provenance to it, characterizing it as "heir to all those who oppose the city of God." (Note: Morlat 2019, p. 103)

The Masonic press and lodges have responded with alacrity to these condemnations, which they view as retrograde. Their responses have sometimes been infused with irony, and some lodges have even chosen to engage directly with the Pope. These attacks from the clergy have primarily targeted the Grand Orient of France. In response, the Order has taken action, petitioning the Minister of the Interior and Religious Affairs when a sermon in a place of worship during priestly functions was deemed to "incite hatred by turning citizens against one another". (Note: Morlat 2019, p. 108)

Poster illustrated with a representation of Baphomet, promoting Les mystères de la franc-maçonnerie, one of Léo Taxil's anti-Masonic pamphlets (1896).

Gradually, anti-Masonic committees began to emerge across Europe, driven by the Catholic Church. In 1892, Father Gabriel de Bessonies established the Anti-Masonic Committee of Paris and published articles in La Croix and Le Pèlerin under the pseudonym Gabriel Soulacroix. In 1893, the Universal Anti-Masonic Union was established in Rome. An association in Paris, which appears to be a subsidiary of the Roman one, explicitly states its objective of combating Freemasonry. The entire membership of the central committee is approved by the Archbishopric of Paris, and the committee subsequently publishes a document entitled La franc-maçonnerie démasquée [Freemasonry Unmasked]. (Note: Morlat 2019, p. 220) On September 29, 1895, the inaugural international anti-Masonic congress was convened in Trento, in Austrian Tyrol. The discussions are focused on the examination of Masonic doctrines and the development of strategies for their refutation. During this congress, the figure of Léo Taxil, a former Freemason and perpetrator of a long-running and lucrative hoax, assumes a prominent role. Taxil's activities, centered on a pseudo-religious conversion and the publication of anti-Masonic works, contributed significantly to the propagation of reactionary currents between 1892 and the end of the century. (Note: Morlat 2019, p. 224)

A second congress was convened the following year in Paris with the objective of implementing the decisions that had been made the previous year. For Freemasons of the Grand Orient of France, the selection of Paris as the venue is perceived as a direct challenge from the Holy See. Léo Taxil and Abbot Bessonies, two of the primary signatories of the congress's call, sought to counteract French anti-clerical legislation. In response, the Order issued a forceful and unambiguous rebuttal, characterizing the congress as a "gathering of discredited writers and fanatical priests" and asserting that its objective was to subjugate the French Masonic movement's struggle for religious liberty in order to impose papal authority over French society. (Note: Morlat 2019, p. 222)

== Crises and political affairs ==
=== Boulangism ===
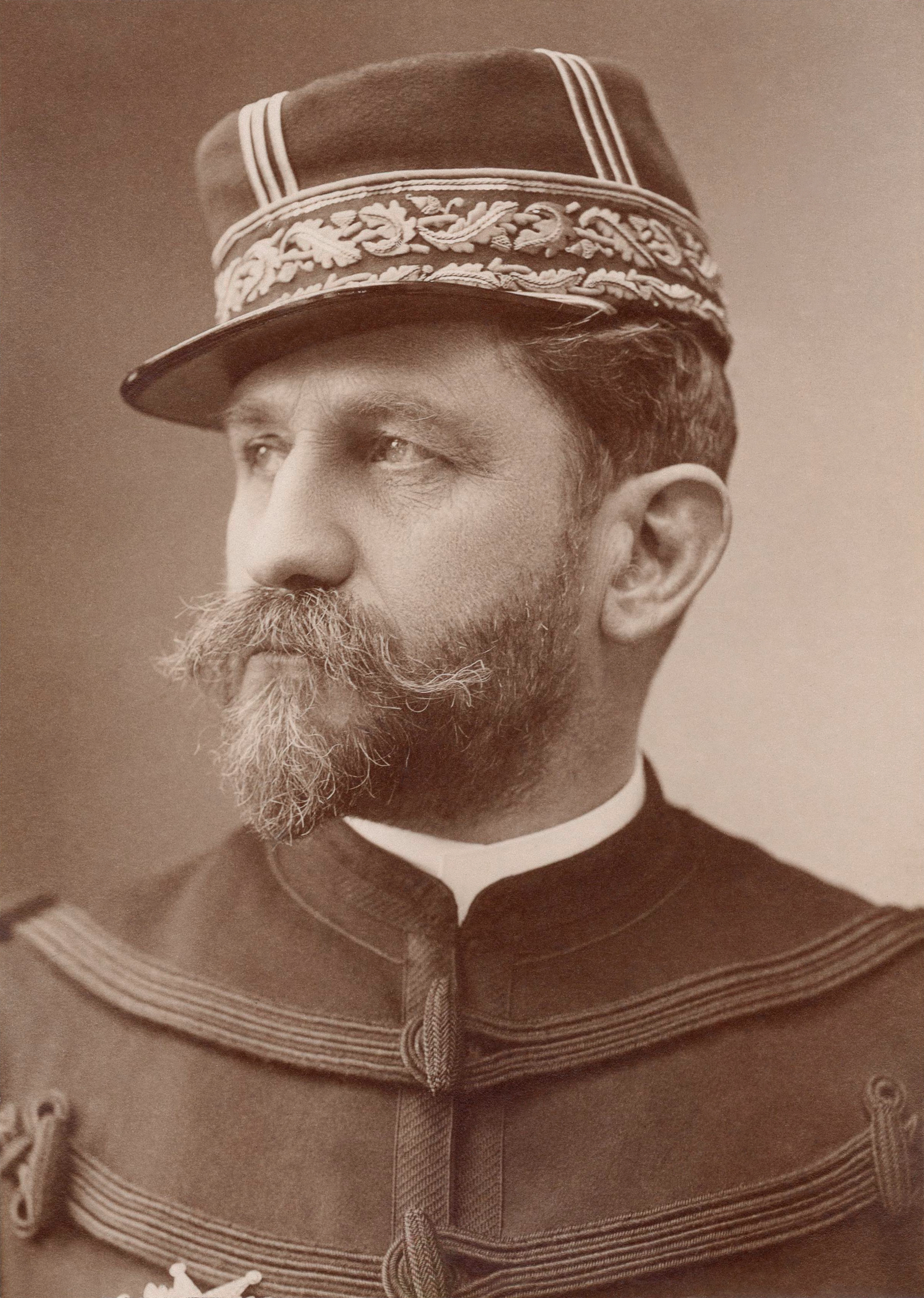
General Georges Ernest Boulanger.

The Boulangist crisis coincides with a period of significant transformation and internal conflict within Masonic orders. These conflicts are both generational and ideological, with one faction comprising individuals from the opposition to the Second Empire, while the other represents a new, more militant generation of Freemasons. The former does not espouse anti-clericalism and views lodges as elitist clubs focused on philosophical work, whereas the latter is more politically engaged and largely supports radical ideology. (Note: Rycx 2019, p. 193)

The adoption of Boulangist ideas, which commenced in 1885, initially manifested as a personal choice by select Freemasons, particularly among radical leftist parliamentarians such as Charles-Ange Laisant and Alfred Naquet. The latter, an advocate of uncompromising radicalism, publishes a well-documented text in which he offers a critique of the parliamentary system, which he deems incoherent and ineffective. The proposed revision of the constitution by General Boulanger receives support from Freemasons, and Boulangist ideas give rise to impassioned debates within the more politically active lodges between those who oppose and those who support them. In March 1888, Georges Laguerre, a former member of the Grand Orient's governing council and the Parisian lodge La République démocratique, established the Republican Committee of National Protest. Laguerre's actions and influence contributed to the evolution of Boulangist ideas within Masonic orders, particularly in light of General Boulanger's retirement.

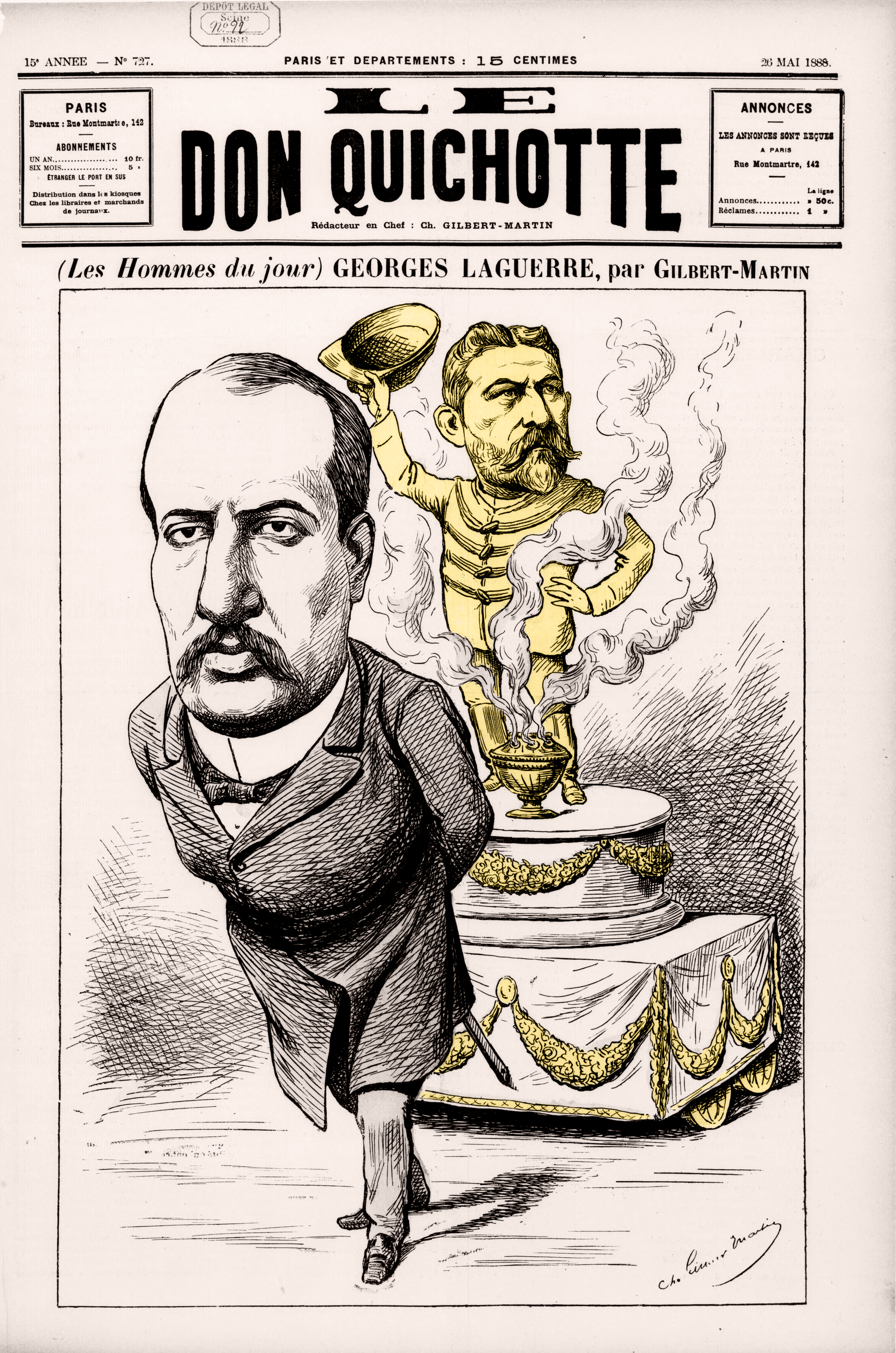
Cartoon in Le Don Quichotte depicting Freemason Georges Laguerre pulling General Boulanger on a tank (1888).

In a personal statement published in the Boulangist daily L'Intransigeant, Frédéric Desmons, president of the Grand Orient's council, articulated his affinity for the tenets of republican Boulangism and endorsed the notion of a divinely appointed leader. However, this private missive, which was not initially intended for a public audience, provides moral support to the National Protest Committee in response to critics who express concern about its increasingly authoritarian tendencies. Subsequently, Camille Pelletan demands that Frédéric Desmons retract his statements and denounce Boulangism, which he characterizes as plebiscitary and Bonapartist. Subsequently, Desmons presents explanations that Pelletan deems intricate. These explanations prompt ardent anti-Boulangist Freemasons to demand elucidation, to definitively resolve the controversy. The discussions at the 1887 convention are impassioned, resurrecting, through the Boulangist question, the issue of Masonic orders' political engagement in general, as well as the confrontation between supporters and detractors of General Boulanger, and conflicts between generations. (Note: Rycx 2019, pp. 102–103)

From 1888 onward, anti-Boulangism began to gain ground within the ranks of French Freemasonry. The Grand Orient underwent a significant transformation, prioritizing a vigorous campaign for republican ideals and against Caesarism. This shift involved a deliberate unification and assertiveness in strategy, leading to the emergence of a "combat masonry" that rethought its methods of dissemination and action. (Note: Rycx 2019, p. 124) By 1889, "Masonic anti-Boulangism" had become the dominant force within Masonic orders. However, this transformation did not eradicate the existence of an opposing and occasionally aggressive "Masonic Boulangism." This movement ultimately succumbed to defeat, becoming part of the process of constructing a mythologized historiography of French Freemasonry. From this point onward, the organization was defined as the "sword and shield of the Republic." (Note: Rycx 2019, p. 194)

=== The Dreyfus Affair ===
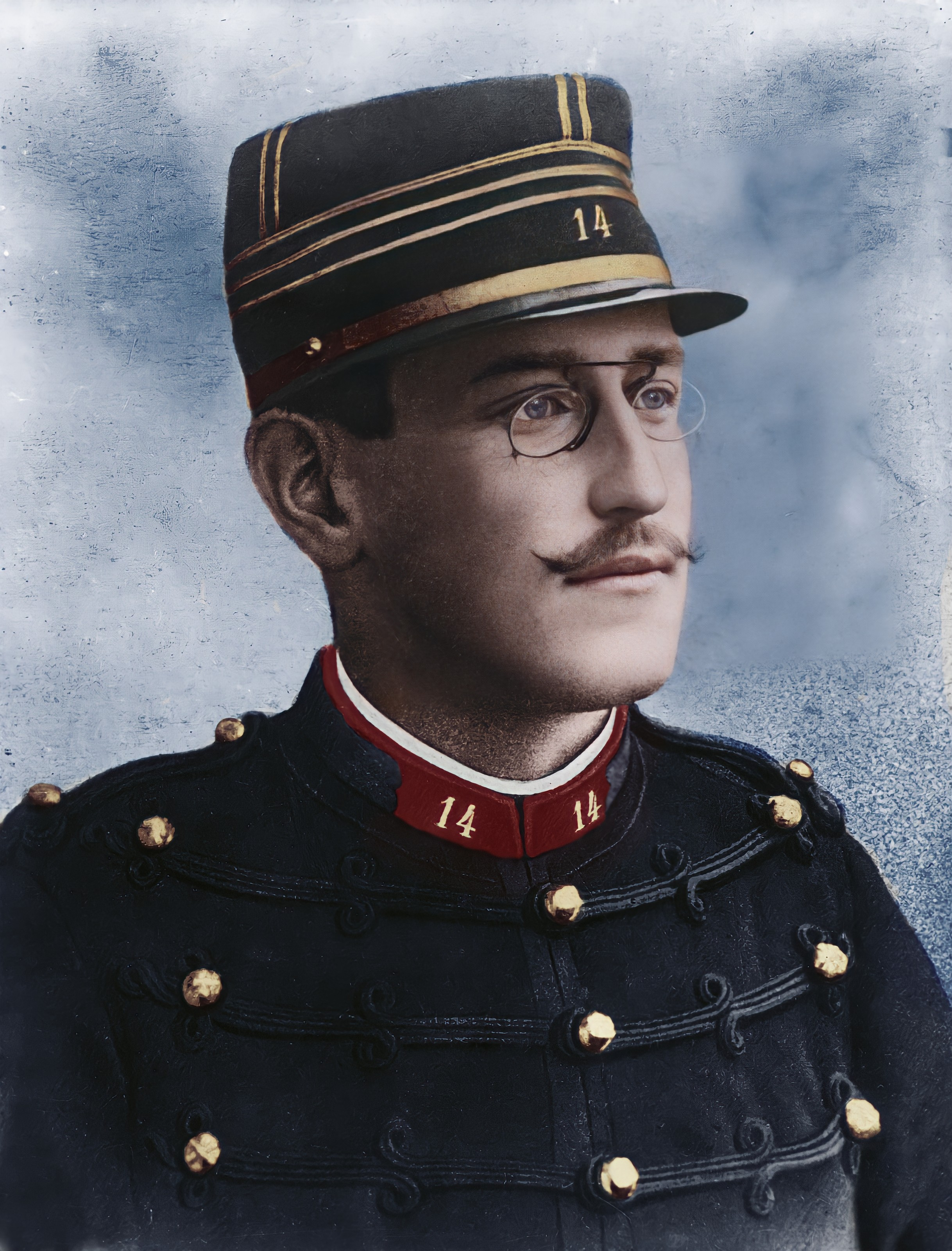
Captain Alfred Dreyfus.

The Dreyfus Affair is not a subject of debate within Freemasonry with regard to the circumstances surrounding the accusation and subsequent conviction of Captain Alfred Dreyfus. The majority of Masonic obediences and lodges have chosen to remain silent on the matter. The only official reaction to the affair comes from the Grand Orient of France, which issues a statement clarifying that Alfred Dreyfus, a member of the obedience, is a peaceful merchant with no relation to the individual known as "the traitor". The majority of Freemasons concur with the assertion put forth by Jules François Gabriel, the director of Le Petit Méridional, that "Captain Dreyfus has been justly and legally convicted." Initially, Freemasonic obediences demonstrated a cautious or indifferent stance towards the case, eschewing any criticism of the army or positions that could incite nationalist backlash. The prevailing sentiment among Freemasons was one of neutrality or anti-Dreyfusard sentiment.

Nevertheless, some protests emerge subsequent to the trial and conviction. Paschal Grousset, a radical deputy and member of the "Diderot" lodge, and journalist Louis Minot, a member of the "L'Équerre" lodge, publicly denounced the proceedings of the trial. Former Minister Yves Guyot denounces the trial's irregularities in his lodge, "Le Matérialisme scientifique". Joseph Reinach, a deputy from Basses-Alpes, Arthur Ranc, a senator from Seine, and Charles Risler are among the first Freemasons to express support for Dreyfus. However, the case is scarcely discussed in lodge debates between 1895 and 1896.

The publication of Émile Zola's J'accuse…! prompted a shift in the opinions of Freemasons. A number of lodges expressed their support for the petition initiated by the intellectuals, which called for a review of the proceedings. Some subsequently affiliated with the nascent League of Human Rights. Nevertheless, in May 1898, the obediences continued to maintain their distance from the events, particularly given the electoral setbacks experienced by Dreyfusard Freemasons such as Gustave-Adolphe Hubbard, Joseph Reinach, and Jacques Sever. Their support for Captain Dreyfus had undoubtedly contributed to these losses. In the same year, following impassioned discussions at the Paris lodges' congress and in numerous lodges throughout the country, the 1898 convention passed an anti-conspiracy resolution and called for the trial's revision, without referencing the possibility of Dreyfus's innocence. This represents a unifying act for the Dreyfusard cause, framed not as a moral but an ideological and political struggle, aligned with defending the Republic and its institutions. Nevertheless, the aforementioned belated decisions do not obscure the fact that some anti-Dreyfusard Freemasons continue to espouse a form of "left-wing anti-Semitism" that aligns with the anti-Semitic sentiments prevalent in the Algerian lodges, which sympathized with the theories of Édouard Drumont and Max Régis.

In 1899, a significant proportion of the lodges expressed their support for the proposed revisions. On May 10 of that year, the Grand Orient initiated a demonstration in solidarity with Dreyfus and launched a campaign to influence public opinion. The demonstration proved to be a resounding success. In June 1899, Pierre Waldeck-Rousseau formed his government and suppressed the nationalist uprisings that accompanied the trial revision, which began in August. In September, the Grand Orient convention called for the complete eradication of the conspiracy, which it identifies as comprising the clerical, Caesarist, and monarchist elements. The revision does not exonerate Dreyfus, who was not fully rehabilitated until 1906. From 1900 to 1901, Freemasons exaggerated their role in the fight for revision, (Note: Vanessa Ragache and Édouard Boeglin question and discuss in their works what they see as a missed opportunity for French Freemasonry in general, and the GODF in particular, for waiting too long to join the Dreyfusard movement without ever strongly opposing the politico-military and anti-Semitic conspiracy.) creating a radical and patriotic myth that strengthened anti-clericalism in lodges during the struggle for the separation of Church and State.

=== Affair of the Cards ===
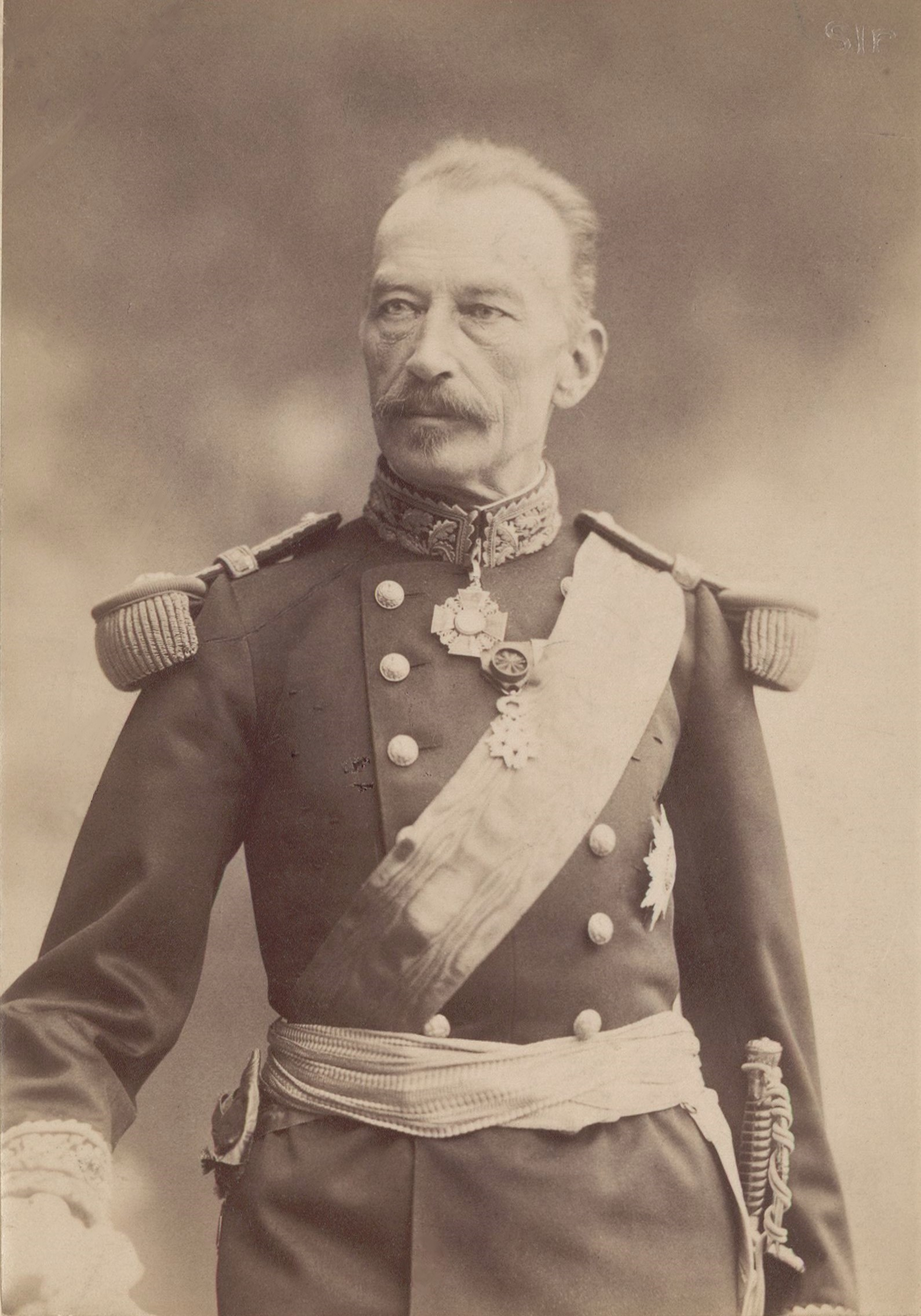
General Louis André.

The Affair of the Cards is situated within the broader context of the Boulangist and Dreyfus Affairs. Following these two crises, a segment of the Republican camp fostered a growing sense of distrust towards the "great silent one" (the Army), perceiving it as a potential threat to the stability of the republican system. This sentiment was driven by the belief that the Army was serving the interests of reactionary forces and posed a plausible risk of instigating a coup d'état. The controversy primarily centered around the Minister of War in Émile Combes's cabinet, General Louis André. The affair holds significant historical importance as a pivotal event in the annals of the Grand Orient of France and Freemasonry during the Third Republic. (Note: Morlat 2019, p. 304)

==== "The sword and the chalice" ====
The limited presence of Freemasons within the army, and even more so in the navy, the evident tendency of senior officers towards nationalism, and sometimes even the far right, as evidenced by the Dreyfus Affair, make the leadership of the Grand Orient de France particularly sensitive to the issue of the interconnection between the Catholic Church and the army. (Note: Morlat 2019, p. 301) The Masonic orders denounce the "alliance of the sword and the chalice", which they perceive as a continuation of the "alliance of the throne and the altar". Clemenceau employs this metaphor in his speeches. The image remains vivid as the intelligence system is established, with the Grand Orient playing a role therein. Furthermore, the observation of the low presence of Freemasons and the maintenance of a standing army is also perceived as a potential threat to civil liberties and the stability of the Republic. The political crisis precipitated by General Boulanger and the Dreyfus Affair served to exacerbate this distrust. For numerous Freemasons, the army was perceived to be under the sway of the Church, with officers from Saint-Cyr or Polytechnique predominantly hailing from the bourgeoisie, frequently exhibiting a strong adherence to Catholicism. Consequently, the radical government and other republican associations endeavored to ascertain the political proclivities of officers within the army corps. (Note: Morlat 2019, p. 305)

==== The fiching and the scandal ====
On May 28, 1900, Pierre Waldeck-Rousseau, the Prime Minister of France, appointed General Louis André as Minister of War. He promptly initiated efforts to reinstate discipline within the military, where numerous officers had openly engaged in the Dreyfus Affair. He also dismissed generals who had expressed criticism of his actions. (Note: Morlat 2019, p. 308) In the absence of a reliable existing military hierarchy, André was compelled to seek assistance from republican associations, as represented by Captain Henri Mollin, in the formation of an army comprising officers who were loyal to republican ideals. Mollin, a Freemason, approached Frédéric Desmons, the president of the Grand Orient of France, to request assistance. Desmons was the head of an organization with lodges in numerous cities throughout France. (Note: Morlat 2019, p. 310) The Council of the Order was not formally consulted and the council's office gave its authorization, thereby establishing a desire to maintain the confidentiality of the operation. No circulars were distributed to the lodges in general; only the most trusted lodge presidents were contacted directly. In practice, although the obedience was not openly solicited, the lodges sent their information to the Grand Orient headquarters in anonymous forms, where it was typed. The fiching operation, as this process was known, was managed by Secretary Narcisse Vadecard and his assistant Jean-Baptiste Bidegain, who centralized the resulting fiches (files) at the Grand Orient headquarters and then forwarded them to the ministry. (Note: This method of transmission gives its name to the affair.) The fiching operation continued smoothly for four years. (Note: Morlat 2019, p. 311)

Through Abbé Gabriel de Bessonies, Jean-Baptiste Bidegain chose to publicly denounce the fiching system established by obedience. He sold a batch of fiches and documents belonging to the Order to Jean Guyot de Villeneuve, a former officer turned nationalist deputy. The latter presented the matter to the government, which avoided resignation by pleading ignorance of the facts. However, the affair sparked a significant scandal.

==== Manifesto of the Grand Orient of France ====
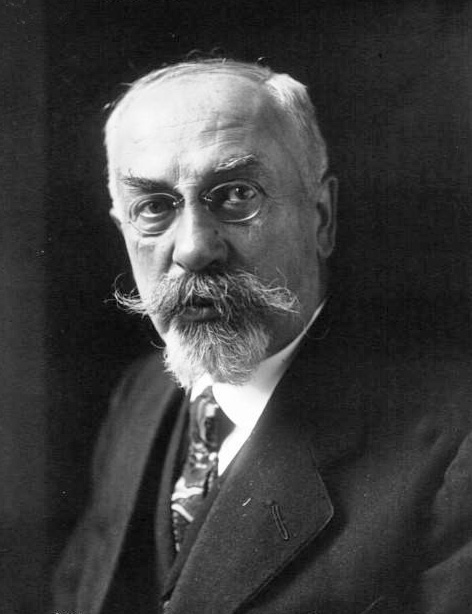
Louis Lafferre, President of the Grand Orient de France during the "fiches" affair.

In the aftermath of the scandal that erupted in the Chamber of Deputies on October 29, 1904, and after determining the consequences of what it saw as a document theft by the "traitor Bigedain", the Grand Orient de France published a manifesto in response. (Note: Morlat 2019, p. 312) The document in question does not express regret; rather, it displays a hint of aggression and pride in the action taken. In response to the campaign initiated by monarchist and clerical forces, which denounces a "system of denunciation", the Freemasons of the Grand Orient assert that their actions represent "small measures contributing to saving the Republic from its eternal enemies." For the Order, the pivotal issue is not the method employed, but rather the betrayal perpetrated by Bigedain. He is denounced as a "traitor and scoundrel bribed by the money of the Congregationalists", and a "criminal on the run." The condemnation is vehement. The manifesto then admits that information has been provided to the Ministry of War. The information concerns those in the army whose attitude or anti-republican convictions could pose a threat to civil institutions. The Grand Orient de France therefore believes that it has exercised both a right and a strict duty. (Note: Morlat 2019, p. 314)

The affair has had a significant and far-reaching impact on both the Republican camp and French Freemasonry. (Note: Rycx 2019, p. 192) Freemason parliamentarians are engaged in a series of discussions regarding the appropriate response to the recent developments, with a view to determining the most appropriate course of action. There is a divergence of opinion on this matter. In an interview with the newspaper Le Matin in November 1904, Louis Lafferre, who assumed leadership of the Order in 1903, presented his account of the events in question. He posits that the Grand Orient acted at the behest of the government, thereby rendering the incident a mere fabrication. Moreover, the Council of the Order did not engage in any deliberations on the matter, thereby attempting to shield the lodges from any potential culpability, which fell exclusively on the president of the council. (Note: Morlat 2019, p. 322) Additionally, he presides over the internal debate at the 1905 convention, while announcing the conclusion of his tenure as Grand Master at the end of the year. The report on the affair characterizes the surveillance of officers and senior officials as a "Masonic certainty", which it defines as an effort aimed at the secularization of all societal institutions. Furthermore, the document indicates that the attacks on the Order occurred during the ongoing debate surrounding the separation of church and state. (Note: Morlat 2019, p. 323) The discussions at the convention are notable for their intensity, with a number of critical motions being put forth for consideration. However, these motions ultimately prove ineffective in influencing the majority of the convention, which maintains its support for the Council of the Order. Louis Lafferre concludes the debates before moving to the vote, aligning with his internal opponents. He asserts that "principled considerations and fine theories" are harmful, but that it is through "energetic actions" that one serves the Republic. The report is voted on unanimously, with three dissenting votes. The 1905 convention approves the actions of the secretariat and the presidency in the fiching affair. (Note: Morlat 2019, p. 327)

== Colonial question ==
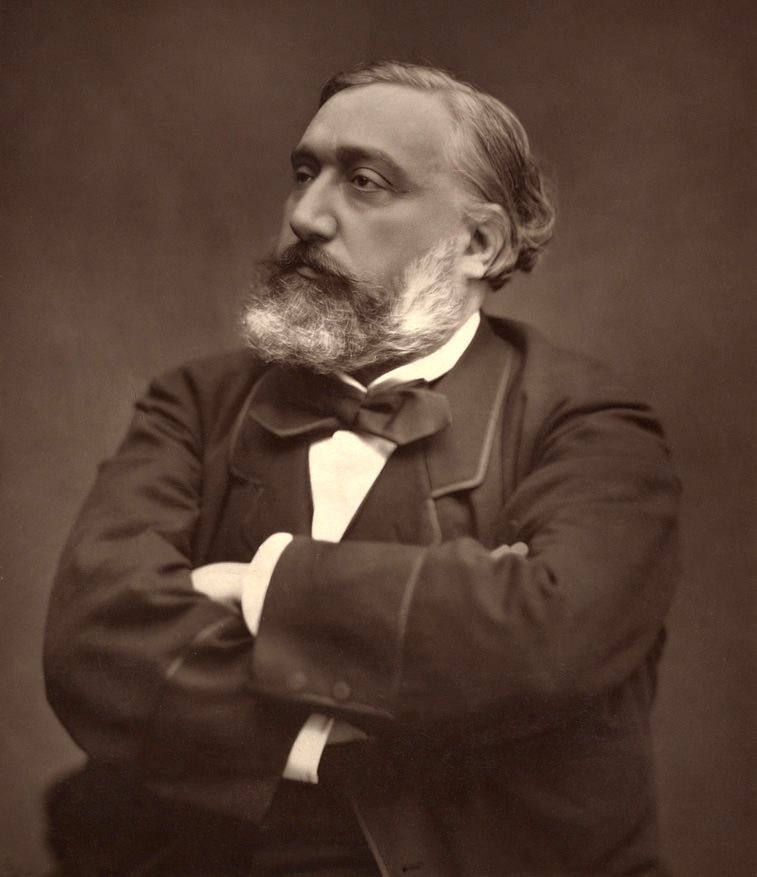
Léon Gambetta, precursor of the colonial idea.

French Freemasonry's involvement in colonial policy commenced at a relatively late stage in its evolution. Before this, numerous political figures who were members of Freemasonry played pivotal roles in the formulation of overseas expansion policy. (Note: Morlat 2019, p. 382) Lodges established in the colonized territories contributed to the process of assimilation and to the implementation of republican education initiatives designed to foster a "French spirit" among both colonists and indigenous populations.

Nevertheless, despite the considerable presence of Freemasons in the political process of colonization or its expansion, the influence of the Grand Orient de France and other obediences on the policy pursued by the Ministry of the Overseas was, in fact, minimal. While historical documentation indicates a degree of alignment between the activities of colonial lodges and ministerial decisions on matters such as indigenous labor issues or the development of colonial resources, these subjects were also discussed with various other political organizations, including the French Section of the Workers' International (SFIO) and the League of Human Rights. (Note: Morlat 2019, p. 250)

In 1910, the Grand Orient established a permanent committee for overseas lodges. Subsequently, the Grand Lodge established a colonial commission. The councils of the Orders received information or requests from the colonial lodges, but these were initially accorded minimal attention by the leading bodies. Between 1920 and 1940, the number of French lodges increased in the colonies, protectorates, and the Near East, with the influence of these lodges also growing. Local congresses were occasionally organized jointly between obediences in the colonial territories. While the majority of the topics discussed were analogous to those in the metropolitan areas, some were unique to the local context, including the living conditions of the indigenous populations, their naturalization, the appropriation of land by large capitalist companies, and the access of women to education.

== World War I ==
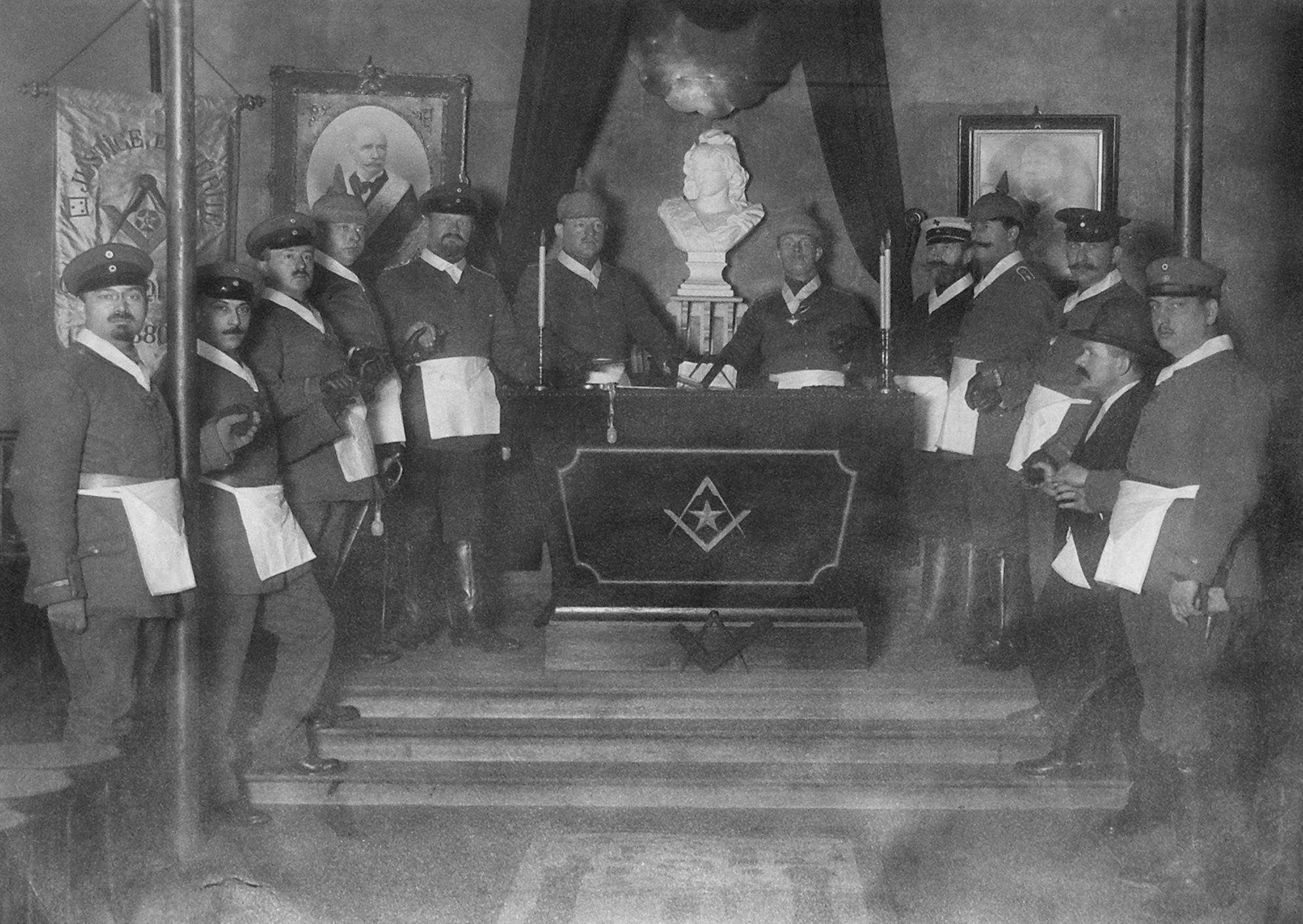
German soldiers lodge in a French temple and in front of Paul Lecreux's bust of the Masonic Marianne in Saint-Quentin, occupied between 1914 and 1918.

The Law of Three Years, which aimed to enhance the military capabilities of the French Army in the context of the impending World War I, became a subject of contention between disparate interpretations of national defense during a period of mounting tensions with Germany. The Grand Orient de France posits that a reorganization of the army is a more efficacious strategy than extending conscription by one year, a position that aligns with that of Jean Jaurès and the SFIOM. (Note: Morlat 2019, p. 330) However, the Order's council takes a more nuanced position, attempting to reconcile the country's defensive needs with the objective of maintaining the two-year service requirement. The law was passed on July 19, 1913, and the debates that ensued were characterized by intense engagement from Freemason parliamentarians on both sides of the issue. In general, radical Freemasons voted in favor of the law, while socialist Freemasons rejected it. (Note: Chevallier 1975, p. 200) Despite expressing hostility toward the law, the Grand Orient's September convocation refrained from launching a vehement attack, wary of the potential exploitation of such criticisms by nationalist and conservative factions. Instead, a simple resolution was issued after the debates, expressing regret over the government's decision not to prioritize the reorganization of the national army. (Note: Morlat 2019, p. 331)

The stance of the primary Masonic obedience concerning the reconciliation of pacifism and patriotism remains ambiguous. The Masonic obedience advocates both the strengthening of national defense and the promotion of universal peace, a value closely associated with Freemasonry. (Note: Morlat 2019, p. 332) However, the onset of the First World War in 1914 led to the dissolution of the Masonic ideal, as the vast majority of Freemasons considered the defense of the homeland a duty. Consequently, the Masonic ties with German Freemasonry were severed once again, and Masonic powers in the belligerent nations mutually renounced each other while supporting their respective countries. (Note: Chevallier 1975, p. 201)

The number of Freemasons mobilized and fallen in battle is primarily known through the monuments and various commemorations erected or maintained by the obediences in the years following the end of the conflict. (Note: The figures are an estimate that still needs to be refined according to historian Hivert-Messeca.) A review of monographs on French Masonic lodges indicates that one in seven French Freemasons died on the battlefield, with similar losses among German, Italian, and British Freemasons, representing approximately 3% of the European Masonic membership at the time.

== Between the wars ==
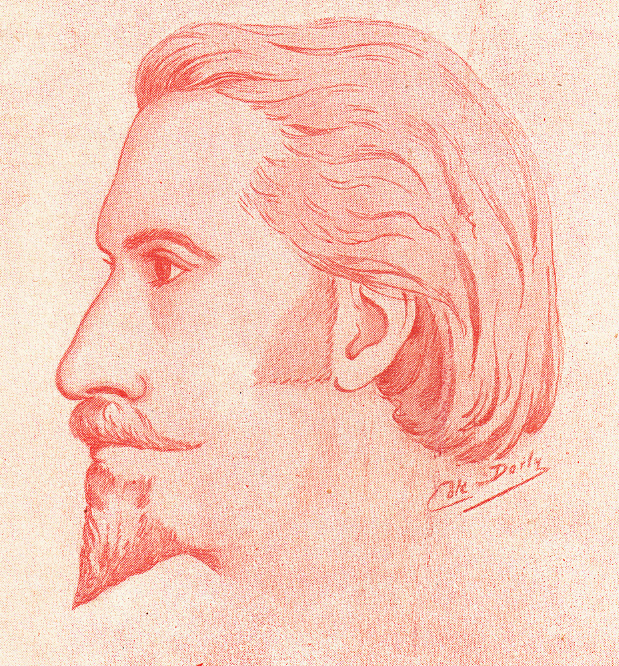
Essayist Albert Lantoine, in favor of reconciliation with the Holy See.

Immediately following the conclusion of World War I, French lodges entered a new phase of activism and recruitment, in response to the commemorations held in honor of the numerous fallen soldiers. The membership of lodges was significantly diminished by the loss of Freemasons who perished on the battlefield and the near absence of recruitment during the war. In 1919, the Grand Orient promoted a common program aimed at the republican bloc. The program's primary objectives are the defense of secularism, the revision of the constitution, and the implementation of economic reform proposals. In the November 1919 elections, the divided left suffered a significant electoral defeat. (Note: Morlat 2019, p. 653) The national bloc, which secures the majority of seats, forms the "Blue Horizon Chamber", thereby reinstating right-wing political parties to power after their exclusion from the country's leadership since 1899. (Note: Morlat 2019, p. 654) The Affair of the Cards and the convenient renunciations of several Freemason politicians render it challenging for the orders to defend the pre-war parliamentary left's achievements. (Note: Morlat 2019, p. 661) It is evident that a considerable number of Freemason parliamentarians, particularly those affiliated with the radical socialist movement, tend to cast their votes in accordance with their personal convictions or self-interest rather than in alignment with the Masonic cause. (Note: Morlat 2019, p. 662) The victory of the left-wing cartel in May 1924 is celebrated by the obediences, which had widely supported it. They then urge elected parliamentarians to implement their political program in a firm and comprehensive manner. In 1922, the 22nd condition of the Third Communist International is made public, which forbids Communist Party members from belonging to Freemasonry, considering it a "bourgeois political organization."

The pacifist sentiment, which experienced a resurgence and permeated various social strata across Europe in the aftermath of the conflict, once more gained a foothold within Masonic lodges. The post-war pacifist values are grounded in the notion of educating the populace and safeguarding civilization. These ideals are not unique to Freemasons, and thus, they lack a distinctive character. In 1921, the International Masonic Association (AMI) was established to restore close Masonic relations between European obediences. Nevertheless, national sensitivities persist, and differences in interpretation give rise to a variety of conceptions of Masonic pacifism. The Swiss Grand Lodge Alpina, which hosts the AMI, attempts to federate them on a minimal platform that includes the fight against nationalism, the promotion of international cooperation, and economic peace. Ultimately, none of the major events that shook the interwar period profoundly altered the official line of the orders engaged in the AMI. Their position remains that of moral and humanist pacifism, which, like many other pacifist currents, proves rather ineffectual.

The initiative to re-establish a French diplomatic mission close to the Holy See and resume diplomatic relations with the Roman Curia has prompted the involvement of a segment of the French Freemasonry. The Grand Orient de France has denounced the resurgence of clericalism and societal regression. (Note: Morlat 2019, p. 635) Nevertheless, some members view this matter as a chance to reinvigorate the lodges and endeavor to reinstate their former level of activity and prominence. Nevertheless, their activism is considerably less pronounced than that of the reactionary forces aligned with Charles Maurras, whose ideology is driven by the national bloc and the development of politicians, who are united by the perceived threat of the Bolshevik Revolution to European stability and the resurgence of nationalisms. (Note: Morlat 2019, p. 636) A current of opinion favoring reconciliation, led by Albert Lantoine and the spiritualist Freemason Oswald Wirth, exists within the Grand Lodge of France but remains controversial. (Note: Chevallier 1975, p. 290) Michel Dumesnil de Gramont, the Grand Master, notes the numerous encyclicals that have condemned Freemasonry and suggests that the Church could begin by dismantling these as a first step. (Note: Chevallier 1975, p. 292)

The involvement of the obediences in the political-financial scandal, in which swindler Alexandre Stavisky and counselor Albert Prince are the main protagonists, has yet to be proven, in contrast to the Affair of the Cards, in which the Grand Orient de France is involved and in which the obedience, through Louis Lafferre, claims full responsibility for the organization. The scandal nevertheless had a profound impact on the French obediences, with anti-Masonic currents emerging to denounce what they perceived to be a direct responsibility of Freemasonry in the affair that rocked the Republic in the 1930s. (Note: Chevallier 1975, p. 230)

== End of the Third Republic ==
The conclusion of the Third Republic signifies the conclusion of a historical period in the history of Freemasonry in France. The ascendance of nationalism in Europe resulted in the triumph of authoritarian and anti-democratic regimes in Spain, Italy, and Portugal. These regimes prohibited Freemasonry, leaving members of French Masonic orders, who perceived the "rising dangers", with the necessity to take definitive action to resist the onslaught of anti-Masonic currents. However, the advent of World War II, the defeat of the French army, and the collapse of the Republic provided adversaries of Masonic orders with an opportunity to inflict what they hoped would be decisive blows. (Note: Chevallier 1975, p. 213) On August 13, 1940, the initial legislation aimed at banning secret societies, with a particular focus on Freemasonry, was enacted. Philippe Pétain, the head of the French state, who had previously expressed his animosity towards Freemasonry, attributed the country's misfortune to the influence of this secret society. He declared, "A Freemason is free to choose, while a Jew is not free from his birth." Consequently, he prohibited the orders, seized their assets, and compiled lists of Freemasons who were barred from holding public office or any elected position.

== Masonic landscape during the Third Republic ==
While engaged in significant political activities, the various Masonic currents and schisms within the orders demonstrated a genuine diversity in the practices and aspirations of Freemasonry in France during the Third Republic. (Note: Dachez & Kupferman 2020, p. 109)

=== Evolution and schism ===
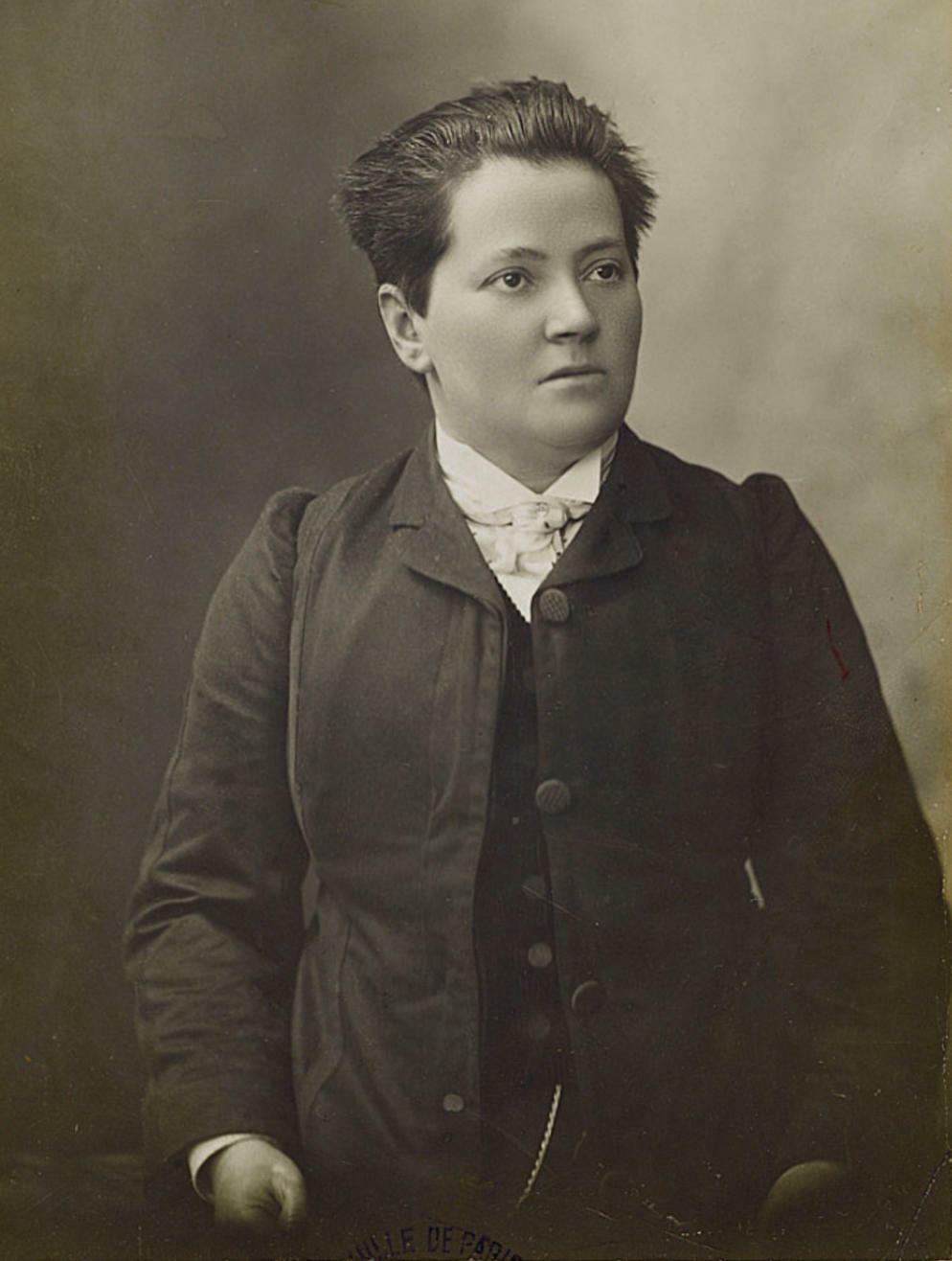
Madeleine Pelletier, a leading figure in the "GLSE mixte et maintenue".

While the Grand Orient de France was the dominant force within the Masonic landscape throughout the Third Republic, the Supreme Council of France, despite its smaller membership, was also a prominent and active presence during this period. In 1860, the Grand Orient removed the reference to God in Masonic rituals. (Note: Dachez & Kupferman 2020, p. 102) This religious reference was also debated within the Scottish Rite during the Lausanne Convent of 1875, which reaffirmed the existence of a creative principle. However, in 1876, Adolphe Crémieux, in his role as grand commander, reminded the Supreme Council that it "does not give a form to the Grand Architect of the Universe." (Note: Dachez & Kupferman 2020, p. 105)

Simultaneously, the authority of the Supreme Council, representing the highest degree of Freemasonry, was being contested by its symbolic lodges. In 1880, twelve lodges seceded from the council to liberate themselves from its purview, thereby establishing the Grande Loge symbolique écossaise. This new body was characterized by a democratic and feminist ethos. Among its members were prominent figures in the French Freemasonry community, including Gustave Mesureur, who would later become the grand master of the Grande Loge de France, and Oswald Wirth, a pioneer in the field of Freemasonry studies.

In response to mounting pressure from its 60 symbolic lodges, the Supreme Council of the Scottish Rite reached an agreement in 1894 to grant them autonomy. This autonomy enabled them to pursue rapprochement and merger initiatives with a significant proportion of the Grande Loge symbolique écossaise lodges. As a result of this merger, a new Masonic body was established: the Grande Loge de France. This body was a partner of the Grand Orient and engaged in numerous societal struggles in the years that followed. (Note: Dachez & Kupferman 2020, p. 106) Some lodges, however, rejected this merger and continued their activities within a "Grande Loge symbolique écossaise — mixed and maintained." This alternative body exhibited libertarian and anarchist tendencies and was able to welcome prominent figures such as Paul Robin and Charles Malato, as well as female figures like Louise Michel and Madeleine Pelletier.

In 1910, Édouard de Ribaucourt and Camille Savoire, in collaboration with several members of the Grand Orient, initiated the establishment of a Masonic center that would adhere to traditional tenets and eschew political influence. They reactivated an existing lodge in Paris that had been in existence since the early nineteenth century, known as "Le Centre des Amis", and reintroduced the Rectified Scottish Rite in France. In essence, a watered-down version of Christianity was proposed at the Grand Orient convent of 1913 for its recreation. Nevertheless, opposition arose, and significant deletions were requested from the ritual texts. (Note: Dachez & Kupferman 2020, p. 108) In a consequence of these decisions, "Le Centre des Amis" and Pierre de Ribaucourt withdrew from the Grand Orient. In 1913, the aforementioned lodges formed a Masonic body and founded the Grande Loge Nationale Indépendante et Régulière pour la France et les colonies, which was based on the L'Anglaise 204 from Bordeaux. (Note: The "Grand National Independent and Regular Lodge for France and the Colonies" became known as the Grand National French Lodge in 1948.) In the same year, it was recognized by the United Grand Lodge of England. In 1929, it proclaimed itself the "Mother Lodge of the World" and established principles that defined the conditions for recognition and for establishing relations with it. The primary one of these was the requirement to believe in a revealed God. This system of "Masonic regularity" marked a complete fracture with the historic and liberal French Masonic bodies, which rejected these principles and obligations.

=== The rise of women in Freemasonry ===
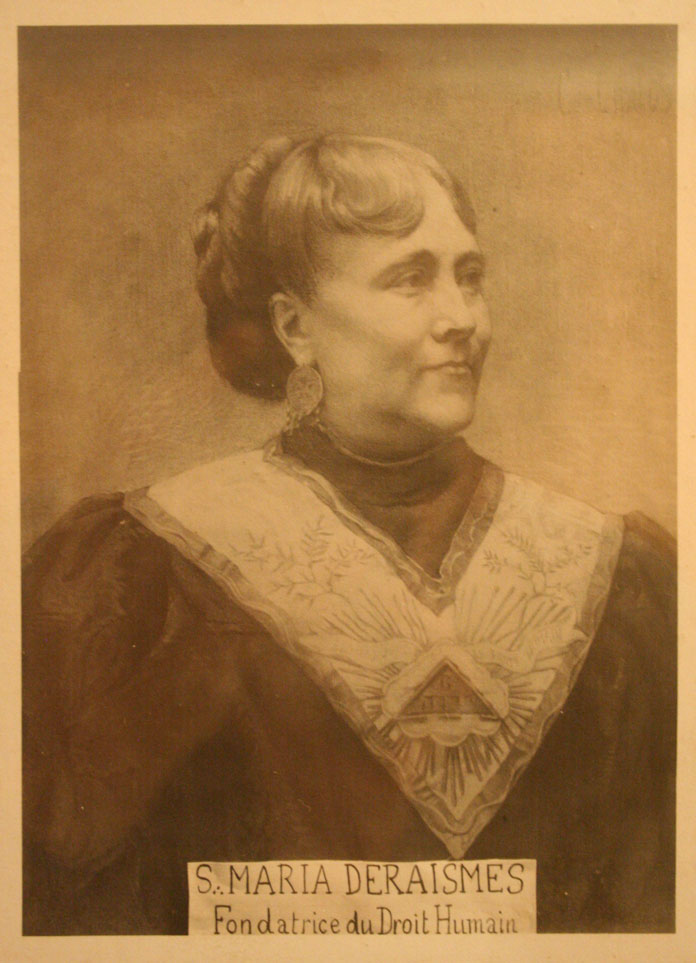
Maria Deraismes, founder of Droit humain.

The Third Republic saw the emergence of mixed and female Freemasonry, which followed the same format as that practiced by men for a century. The Grande Loge symbolique écossaise, inaugurated on March 8, then approved the principle of female initiation and encouraged the inclusion of the authorization to initiate women in the statutes being drafted. However, the constitution promulgated on August 24, 1880, made no provision for the reception of women.

Driven by his humanist and feminist convictions, Georges Martin persisted in demanding and arguing for the equal initiation of women into Freemasonry. In January 1890, he presented a project to establish a mixed lodge, designated "Droit des femmes" (Women's Rights), and sought the opinion of the Grande Loge symbolique écossaise. Although a few lodges expressed support for this initiative, the executive council of the order ultimately rejected it. He subsequently collaborated with Maria Deraismes to establish an autonomous entity for the admission of women. Following several informal preparatory meetings between 1891 and 1893, which took the form of Masonic meetings, Maria Deraismes, wearing her master's cord, initiated and raised sixteen profane women to the grades of companion and then master. All were women engaged in the struggles for emancipation and the defense of republican values. On March 14, 1893, a meeting was held that resulted in the establishment of the inaugural mixed Masonic body in the world, designated as "Grande Loge symbolique écossaise: Le Droit humain."

The advent of this novel Masonic entity was met with considerable resistance. Following numerous debates on the admissibility of women, which frequently disrupted the Grand Orient lodges and never obtained a favorable opinion, it was not until 1921 that the main Masonic body recognized the mixed order and established amicable relations. The already strained relations with the Grande Loge de France (GLDF) were further complicated by its response to the creation of the mixed Masonic order, which saw the GLDF reactivate its adoption lodges in 1901.

In 1927, the Grand Lodge of France declined to acknowledge the human right, which was regarded as excessively radical. This refusal to acknowledge mixed Freemasonry also originated from a desire to segregate its adoption lodges, as the obedience was seeking recognition from the United Grand Lodge of England, which prohibits women from Freemasonry. In 1934, a proposal was submitted to the adoption lodges for their consideration. It encouraged them, for the benefit of their future development, to pursue greater autonomy or even obediential independence. In 1934, provisional structures were established; by 1936, eight adoption lodges remained, comprising 300 members and 2,000 women Freemasons from the Human Right, the majority of whom were engaged in the civic emancipation of women. Despite unfavorable circumstances, the women of the adoption lodges strove to establish a distinct form of Freemasonry that would advocate for women's rights and participate in the evolution of women's status without resorting to mixed membership or compromising the equality of men and women.

=== Diverse movements ===
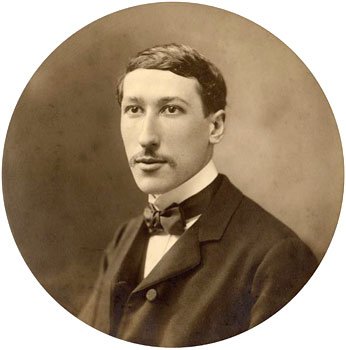
René Guénon in 1925, momentarily a member of the Thebah Lodge.

A spiritualist movement emerged within the Grand Lodge of France. The establishment of the "Thébah" lodge in 1901 by symbolists signified the advent of a movement oriented towards spiritual research, esotericism, and Kabbalah. The first venerable member was Pierre Deulin, who also served as secretary of the Revue cosmique, the official publication of the "Cosmic Movement" established by Max Théon. It attracted individuals affiliated with this movement, as well as alchemists, surrealists, and the esotericist René Guénon. The substantial impact of this movement within the lodge also manifested in the Scottish Rite. The Rite incorporated this sensibility during the rewriting of several high degrees, conducted by Oswald Wirth and Albert Lantoine at the behest of the Grand Commander of the Supreme Council, René Raymond, who was the founder of Thébah and a member of the Cosmic Movement.

A movement emerged within the Grand Orient of France during the interwar period, spearheaded by Arthur Groussier. This movement culminated in 1938 with a comprehensive renovation of the French Rite, which served as the primary reference for the obedience tradition. The practices were returned to more symbolic foundations, reconnecting with texts that were closely aligned with the tenets of speculative Freemasonry. The revised version of the ritual, which was disseminated widely only after World War II, revived an original Masonic tradition, wherein the practice of ancient procedures and symbolic work was reintroduced after nearly a century of eclipse.

Additionally, at the advent of the 20th century, a "fringe Freemasonry", which frequently convened individuals with an affinity for occultism or metaphysics, was also in operation. These marginal but highly active lodges maintained relations with occult circles, such as those led by Dr. Gérard d'Encausse, known as "Papus", the founder of a Martinist and para-Masonic order that lasted for approximately thirty years. Subsequently, the Rite of Memphis-Misraim was also established in France under his influence and guidance. It was subsequently led by three prominent occultists: Charles Détré, Jean Bricaud, and Constant Chevillon. Chevillon's tenure came to an end with his assassination by the French Militia in 1944.

=== Loss of influence and reconstruction ===
In the final years of the interwar period, in 1939, Freemasonry was far from the influential body it had been until World War I. The occurrence of scandals, the discrediting of political figures, and the fear of a new conflict contributed to the amplification of these issues. The Grand Orient of France, the Grand Lodge of France, and the Human Rights Lodge each had a mere 29,000, 12,000, and 2,000 members, respectively. The Independent and Regular Grand Lodge was composed predominantly of British members. The Rite of Memphis-Misraim, led by Constant Chevillon, the Grand Priory of the Gauls with its Rectified Scottish Rite, under the leadership of Camille Savoire, and the Grand Lodge of Universal Brotherhood, a mixed obedience created by the anarchist Paraf-Javal, remained relatively small sects.

In the aftermath of World War II, Freemasons adopted a more discreet approach to protect themselves, a shift from their previous practice of openly parading and announcing their meetings in the press before 1940. Despite the Grand Orient de France's continued engagement with social issues, the influence of Masonic orders has diminished over time. Additionally, there has been a growing interest in works about the history of Freemasonry, symbolism, and spirituality. (Note: Dachez & Kupferman 2020, p. 115) In a France where the Republic has become deeply entrenched and where the influence of Catholicism has shown a significant decline, the practice of radical and anticlerical Freemasonry appears anachronistic in the aftermath of the war. While drawing upon its history from the Third Republic, it undergoes a reconstruction process in the post-war period, combining an initiatory approach with civic engagement, following a prolonged period of political involvement and a brief period of absence during World War II. (Note: Dachez & Kupferman 2020, p. 114)

== See also ==
- History of education in France
- History of secularism in France

== Bibliography ==
- Morlat, Patrice (2019). La République des Frères : Le Grand Orient de France de 1870 à 1940 [The Republic of the Brothers: The Grand Orient of France from 1870 to 1940] (in French). Éditions Perrin. ISBN 978-2-262-07726-6. Archived from the original on December 11, 2024.
- Rycx, Julien (2019). La franc-maçonnerie et la crise boulangiste : 1886-1891 [Freemasonry and the Boulangiste crisis: 1886-1891] (in French). Éditions du Septentrion. ISBN 978-2-7574-2855-9.
- Combes, André (2018). 1914-1968. La franc-maçonnerie, cœur battant de la république [1914-1968. Freemasonry, the beating heart of the republic]. L'univers maçonnique (in French). Éditions Dervy. ISBN 979-10-242-0246-4.
- Hivert-Messeca, Yves (2014). L'Europe sous l'acacia : Histoire de la franc-maçonnerie européenne du XVIIIe siècle à nos jours [L'Europe sous l'acacia: History of European Freemasonry from the 18th century to the present day]. L'univers maçonnique (in French). Vol. 2. Éditions Dervy. ISBN 979-10-242-0023-1.
- Hivert-Messeca, Yves; Hivert-Messeca, Gisèle (2015). Femmes et franc-maçonnerie : Trois siècles de franc-maçonnerie féminine et mixte en France [Women and Freemasonry: Three centuries of mixed and female Freemasonry in France]. L'univers maçonnique (in French) (2nd ed.). Éditions Dervy. ISBN 978-1-02-420113-0.
- Hivert-Messeca, Yves (2016). Hiram et Bellone : Les francs-maçons dans la Grande Guerre (1914-1918) [Hiram and Bellone: Freemasons in the Great War (1914-1918)]. L'univers maçonnique (in French). Éditions Dervy. ISBN 979-10-242-0167-2.
- Chevallier, Pierre (1975). Histoire de la franc-maçonnerie française : La maçonnerie : Église de la République [History of French Freemasonry: Masonry: Church of the Republic]. Les Grandes études historiques (in French). Vol. 3. Librairie Arthème Fayard. ISBN 2-213-00162-6.
- Pierrat, Emmanuel; Kupferman, Laurent (2020). Ce que la République doit aux francs-maçons [What the Republic owes to the Freemasons] (in French). Paris: Éditions First. ISBN 978-2-412-05466-6.
- Dachez, Roger; Kupferman, Laurent (2020). Histoire de la franc-maçonnerie française [History of French Freemasonry]. Que sais-je? (in French). Paris: PUF. ISBN 978-2-7154-0440-3. Archived from the original on December 3, 2024.
- Ragache, Vanessa (1998). Le Grand Orient de France et l'affaire Dreyfus [The Grand Orient de France and the Dreyfus Affair] (in French). EDIMAF. ISBN 2-903846-43-X.
- Prat, Andrée; Loubatière, Colette (2013). L'ordre maçonnique le Droit Humain [The Human Right Masonic Order]. Que sais-je (in French). Paris: PUF. ISBN 978-2-13-062552-0.
- Picard, Marie-France; Kupferman, Laurent (2009). La Grande Loge féminine de France [The Feminine Grand Lodge of France]. Que sais-je? (in French). Paris: PUF. ISBN 978-2-13-057692-1.
- Snoek, Jan A. M. (2012). Le Rite d'adoption et l'initiation des femmes en franc-maçonnerie : Des Lumières à nos jours [The Rite of Adoption and Women's Initiation in Freemasonry: From the Enlightenment to the Present Day]. L'univers maçonnique (in French). Éditions Dervy. ISBN 978-2-84454-939-6.
- Martin, Luis P- (2000). Martin, Luis P. (ed.). Les francs-maçons dans la cité [Freemasons in the city] (in French). Presses Universitaires de Rennes. doi:10.4000/books.pur.19593. ISBN 978-2-86847-516-9.
- Naudon, Paul (2012). La franc-maçonnerie [Freemasonry]. Quadrige (in French). Paris: PUF. ISBN 978-2-13-059447-5.
