= Séparation de corps et d'habitation =

Séparation de corps et d'habitation or only Séparation de corps ('Separation of Person') was one of two forms of divorce which was available in France prior to the French Revolution.

Séparation de corps was a permission from the court for two spouses to legally live separate lives, juridically independent from each other, and dissolved their respective legal responsibilities toward each other. They were, however, still formally married and were not allowed to remarry as long as their spouse was alive. This type of divorce was normally granted to women, as husbands already had legal power over their wives and thus had not need to file for a divorce. In order to have a divorce, a woman had to prove that her husband was insane, or that he had abused her.

Séparation de corps differed from the other option, Séparation de biens ('Separation of Property') in which the wife was declared to be of legal majority and allowed to handle her own economy, which was legally regarded as a form of divorce.

This type of divorce was replaced by the Loi autorisant le divorce en France in 1792, which allowed for an equal divorce and allowed the parties to remarry.
