= Jean-Claude Colfavru =

French lawyer, republican politician and Free-Mason (1820–1891)

President of the Council of the Order of the Grand Orient de France
- In office 1885–1887
- Preceded by: Charles Cousin
- Succeeded by: Frédéric Desmons

Personal details
- Born: 1 December 1820 Lyon, France
- Died: 18 May 1891 (aged 70) Paris, France
- Party: The Mountain; Radical Left
- Occupation: Lawyer and politician

Jean-Claude Colfavru (1 December 1820 – 18 May 1891) was a French lawyer, radical republican politician and Free-Mason. He represented Saône-et-Loire in the National Legislative Assembly during the French Second Republic and later represented Seine-et-Oise in the Chamber of Deputies of the French Third Republic. Within the Grand Orient de France, he founded the Paris lodge La Constante Amitié and served as president of the Council of the Order from 1885 to 1887.

Colfavru was initiated in the Paris lodge Saint-Vincent-de-Paul in 1850. His documented place in the history of the French Rite was principally institutional: he belonged to lodges connected with the Grand Orient, became one of the obedience's principal administrators and publicly defined its civic role under the Third Republic. He also contributed a history of the nineteenth-century Grand Orient to the volume La Franc-Maçonnerie en France depuis 1725, presented at an international Free-Mason congress in 1889.

== Early life and political activity ==
Colfavru was born in Lyon on 1 December 1820. He received a scholarship to attend the secondary school in his native city and qualified as a lawyer in 1845. After moving to Paris, he became involved in the democratic and republican movement.

Following the June Days uprising of 1848, Colfavru was prosecuted because of his republican activity. He was detained first on the prison hulks at Brest and then at Belle Île, before the proceedings against him were dismissed.

On 28 April 1850, he was elected as one of the representatives of Saône-et-Loire in a by-election for the National Legislative Assembly. He sat with the Mountain and opposed the repressive legislation supported by the conservative majority and the policies of President Louis-Napoléon Bonaparte.

Colfavru resisted the coup of 2 December 1851 and joined the protest at the town hall of the former 10th arrondissement of Paris. He was arrested, imprisoned at Mazas Prison and subsequently proscribed. He lived successively in Belgium, London and Jersey, returning to France after the amnesty of 1859 and resuming his legal career in Paris.

== Third Republic ==
Following the proclamation of the Third Republic in September 1870, Colfavru was appointed justice of the peace for the 17th arrondissement of Paris. During the siege of Paris, he commanded the 85th Battalion of the National Guard and was appointed a knight of the Legion of Honour on 12 February 1871. He remained a justice of the peace until 1872 and later practised law in Cairo before returning to France.

In October 1885, Colfavru was elected to the Chamber of Deputies as a radical republican representative for Seine-et-Oise. In December 1886, his proposal to remove the budgetary allocation for subprefects was adopted by 262 votes to 249, leading the government of Charles de Freycinet to resign. He also participated in the parliamentary events surrounding the fall of President Jules Grévy and voted in favour of proceedings against General Boulanger and members of the League of Patriots. His parliamentary term ended in October 1889.

== Free-Mason activity and the French Rite ==
=== Initiation and lodge membership ===
According to historian Julien Rycx, Colfavru was initiated in the Paris lodge Saint-Vincent-de-Paul in 1850. A history prepared for the lodge's bicentenary identifies it as a lodge working the French Rite under the Grand Orient de France.

After resuming his Free-Mason activity in France, Colfavru became an honorary member of the lodge Les Amis de la Patrie and was active in the lodge Le Travail. In 1883 he founded the Paris lodge La Constante Amitié, which became one of the lodges associated with the radical republican current within the Grand Orient.

=== President of the Grand Orient ===
At the Grand Orient convent of 1885, Colfavru was elected president of the Council of the Order after the resignation of Charles Cousin. He directed the Grand Orient until 1887, when he was succeeded by Frédéric Desmons.

During the Third Republic, the French Rite—also then called the Modern Rite—was the most widespread rite in France and was predominant within the Grand Orient. Its system consisted of the three symbolic grades followed by four Orders. Nevertheless, during the 1880s its higher Orders faced increasing competition within the Grand Collège des Rites from the grades of the Ancient and Accepted Scottish Rite.

Colfavru's importance to the French Rite was therefore chiefly connected with lodge administration, the government of the Grand Orient and the public role he assigned to the obedience, rather than with the authorship of a surviving ritual revision.

=== Civic conception of Free-Masonry ===
At the 1885 convent, Colfavru presented a paper entitled De la mission de la franc-maçonnerie dans notre patrie la France (“On the mission of Free-Masonry in our homeland, France”). He argued that Free-Masonry should not restrict itself to private philosophical discussion, but should defend liberty, science and republican government against despotism and obstacles to knowledge.

This position reflected the growing influence of radical republicans inside the Grand Orient. It also formed part of a wider debate, since other members continued to defend the traditional prohibition on divisive political and religious debates inside lodges.

=== Historical writing ===
In 1889, Colfavru and Louis Amiable delivered historical addresses at an international Free-Mason congress held in Paris. They were subsequently published by the Grand Orient's general secretariat as La Franc-Maçonnerie en France depuis 1725.

Colfavru wrote the portion entitled Le Grand Orient de France au dix-neuvième siècle — de 1800 à 1883, covering the history of the institution from the beginning of the nineteenth century to the eve of his own presidency. The work presented the Grand Orient's history from the republican and institutional perspective promoted by its late nineteenth-century leadership.

== Selected works ==
Le Droit commercial comparé de la France et de l'Angleterre (1861). Du mariage et du contrat de mariage en France, en Angleterre et aux États-Unis (1868). Les Français en Égypte: les établissements agricoles de Cam-el-Akdar et de l'Atfeh (1878). Le Grand Orient de France au dix-neuvième siècle — de 1800 à 1883, in Louis Amiable and Jean-Claude Colfavru, La Franc-Maçonnerie en France depuis 1725 (1889).

== Death and legacy ==
Colfavru died in Paris on 18 May 1891, aged 70. His career united radical republican politics with the increasingly public and civic orientation adopted by influential sections of the Grand Orient during the early Third Republic. His principal contributions to French Free-Masonry were the foundation of La Constante Amitié, his leadership of the Council of the Order and his historical and political writings on the mission of the institution.
