= Loi autorisant le divorce en France =

Loi autorisant le divorce en France was a French law introduced during the French Revolution on 20 September 1792. It was the first law to allow for a modern form of divorce, in which both men and women could divorce on equal terms and remarry. At the time it was unique in Europe.

It was in full force until 1804, when it was restricted, and completely abolished in 1816. It was reintroduced in 1884.

== See also ==
- Séparation de corps et d'habitation
