= Gustave Mesureur =

French politician

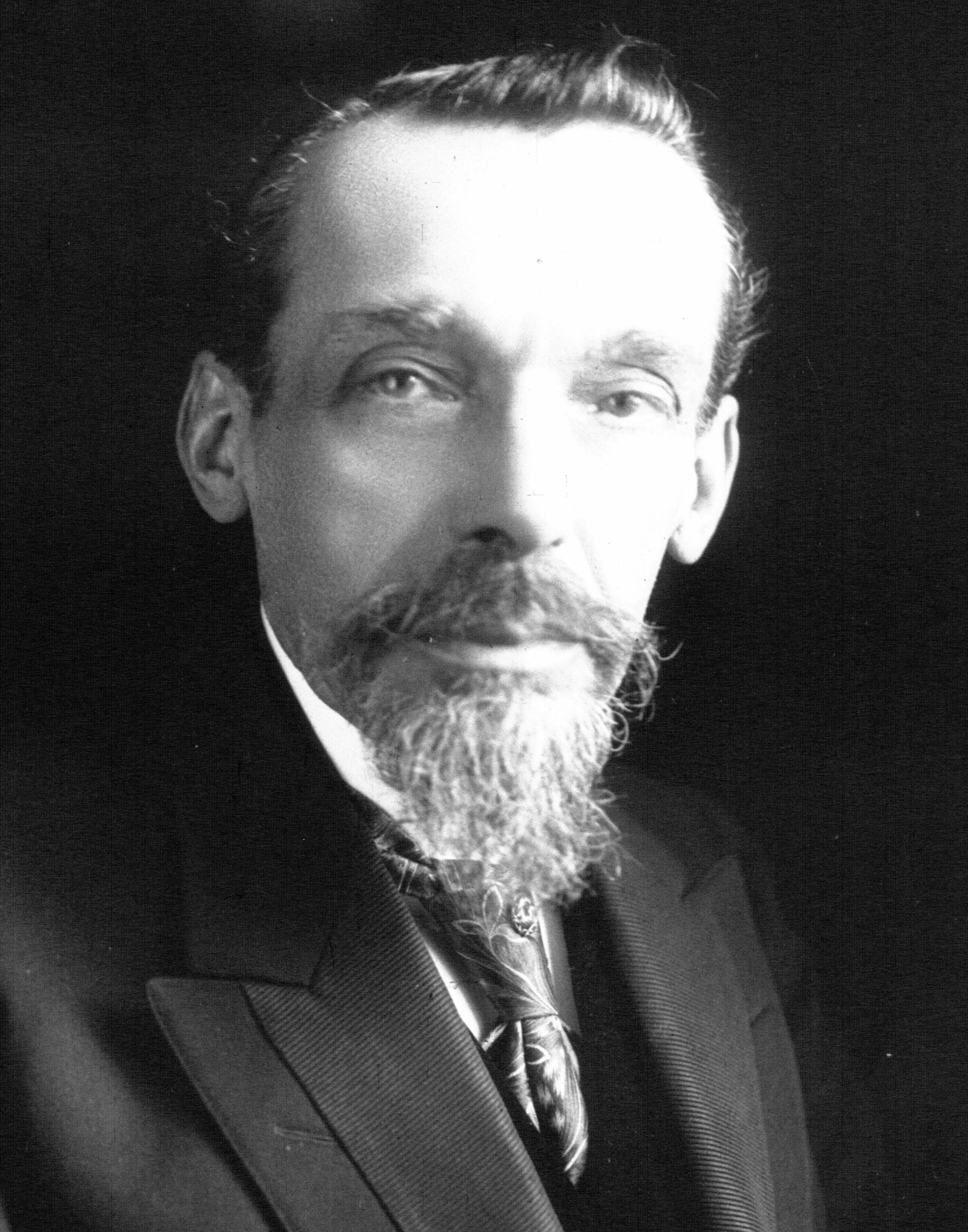
Gustave Mesureur (1912)

Gustave Émile Eugène Mesureur (2 April 1847 – 19 August 1925) was a French politician. He was born in Marcq-en-Barœul (Nord) on 2 April 1847. He worked as a designer in Paris, and became prominent as a member of the municipal council of Paris; rousing much angry discussion by a proposal to rename the Parisian streets which bore saints' names.

In 1887 he became president of the council. The same year he entered the Chamber of Deputies, taking his place with the extreme left. He joined the Léon Bourgeois ministry of 1895-1896 as minister of commerce, industry, post and telegraphs, was vice-president of the Chamber from 1898 to 1902, and presided over the Budget Commission of 1899, 1901 and 1902. He was defeated at the polls in 1902, but became director of the Assistance Publique. His wife, Amélie de Wailly (b. 1853), was well known as a writer of light verse and of some charming children's books.

Mesureur was a prominent freemason. He was Grand Master of the Grande Loge de France from 1903 to 1910, from 1910 to 1911 and from 1924 to 1925.
