= Paul Lecreux =

French sculptor

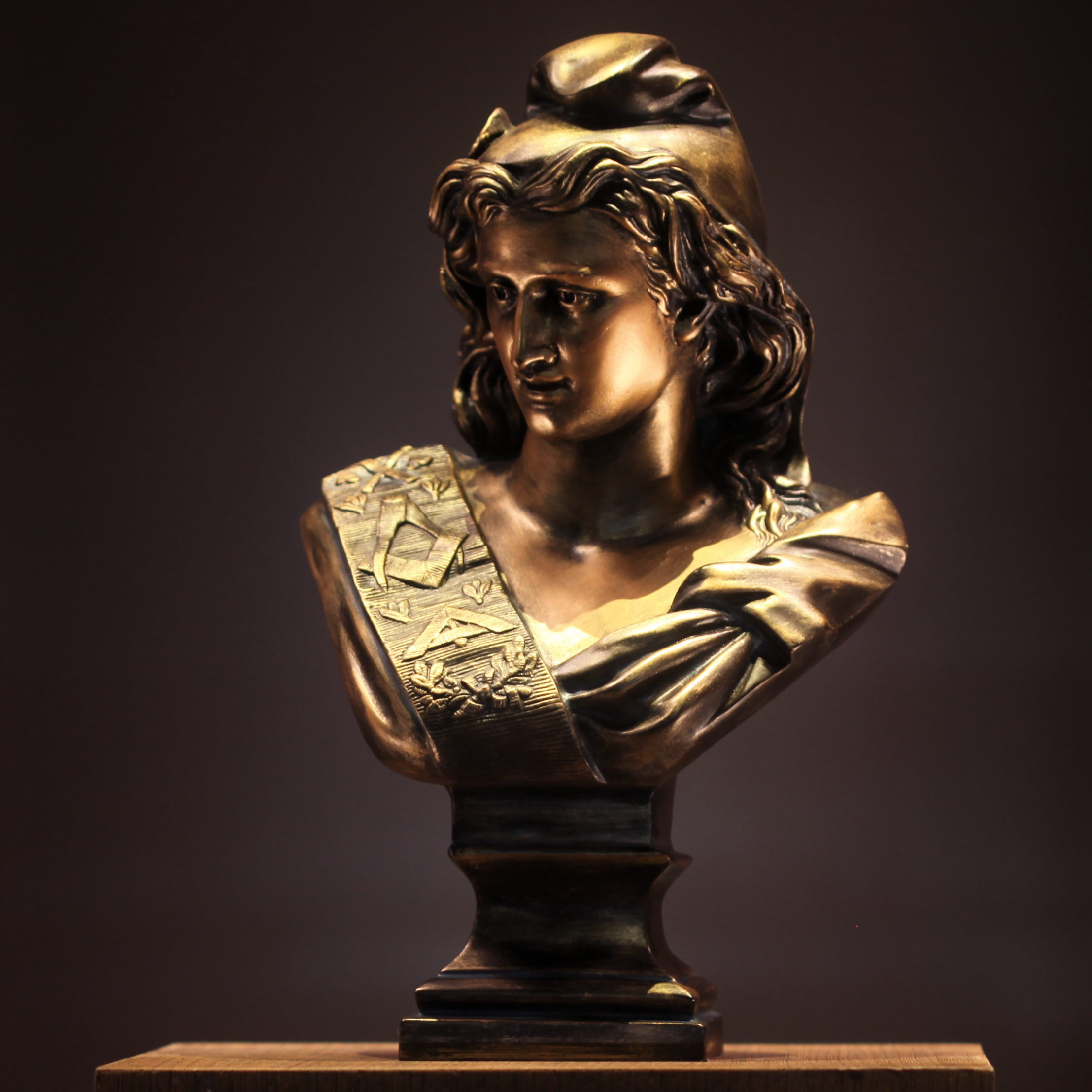
Jacques France (1879), Masonic Marianne

Paul Lecreux (18 February 1826 – 3 July 1894, in Paris) was a French sculptor working under the name Jacques France. The museum in Rouen contains a Bust of the Republic by him, and he also produced a Marianne wearing Masonic attributes.
