= Frédéric Desmons =

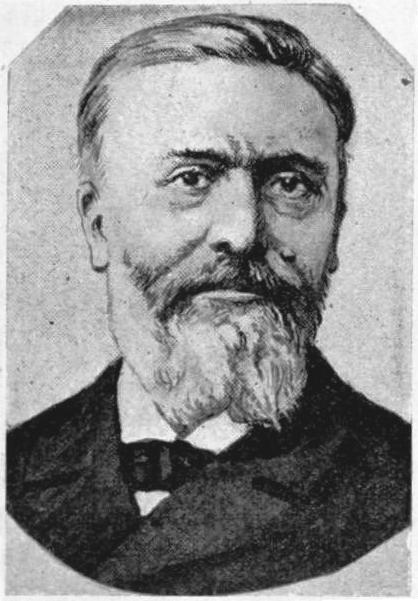
Frédéric Desmons, in 1905.

Frédéric Desmons (14 October 1832, Brignon – 4 January 1910, Paris) was a French Calvinist pastor and freemason who persuaded the Grand Orient de France in a vote to remove the term of the Great Architect of the Universe from their Constitution. This precipitated a split with the United Grand Lodge of England and the birth of liberal or Latin Freemasonry.

He studied in Nîmes and then went on to study theology in Geneva, the stronghold of Calvinism.
