= French Rite =

Masonic rite

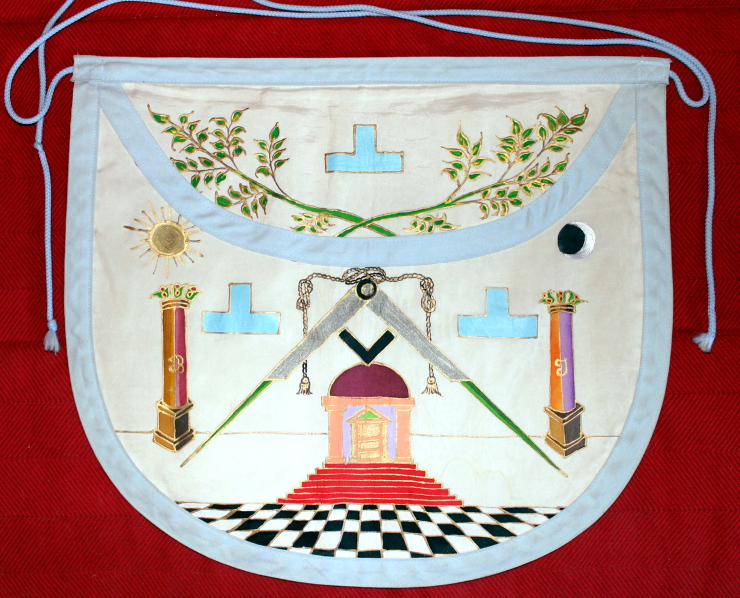
- Venerable Master Apron of the "Traditional" French Rite
- Formation: 1725 (Known as "the ritual"); 1784-1786 (codified as the French Rite)
- Type: Freemasonry
- Headquarters: Paris (originally); Decentralized (today)
- Location: International
- Parent organization: Premier Grand Lodge of England

The French Rite (French: Rite français) is one of the oldest masonic rites, one of the most spread around the world, dominant in France, Belgium, and other French-speaking countries, and with a strong presence in Latin America with an historical presence in Brazil and Argentina. It is the direct heir and one of the best-preserved ritual of speculative Free-Masonry as practiced by the Premier Grand Lodge of London in the early 18th century. Today, it is the historical rite of the Grand Orient de France with approximatively 50,000 to 55,000 Masons, it is also one of the major rites of the Grande Loge Nationale Française and other French obediences, making it by far, the predominant rite in France, Belgium and other countries, it is worked and rapidly growing in many other masonic jurisdictions worldwide with an important presence in South America and Africa.

The French Rite consists of seven steps: three "blue" or craft degrees (Entered Apprentice, Fellow Craft, and Master Mason) and four additional Orders of Wisdom (Ordres de Sagesse), which were codified between 1781 and 1786 by the Grand Orient de France which are not degrees but Orders or grades, reflecting the premiere Grand Lodge's spirit of only having three degrees. It is characterized by the depth and historicity of its ceremonies, its emphasis on both tradition and progressive philosophical thinking, and its strong maintenance of practices from early speculative premiere masonry, that have been modified or abandoned in other systems.

Historically significant, the French Rite underwent several major transformations and declinations depending on where it was practiced, In France one of the major changes happened in 1877 with the removal of religious requirements, establishing the principle of absolute freedom of conscience while it was kept in its original form in Belgium and Brazil. It was then revived in its original form in France thus creating multiple versions of the French Rite.

Today, it exists in several variants, including the Groussier Rite (the Grand Orient version), the premiere or (Modern) French Rite (the oldest version), and the Philosophical French Rite (the newest version), each reflecting different approaches to masonic tradition and philosophy.

Unlike many other masonic rites, the French Rite maintains several distinctive features from early speculative masonry, including the placement of both Wardens in the West (called Occident in the French Rite) and the use of three large candlesticks in specific positions within the lodge. These characteristics, along with its historical development and philosophical orientation, make it a unique repository of early masonic practices while remaining adaptable to contemporary societal evolution.

== History ==
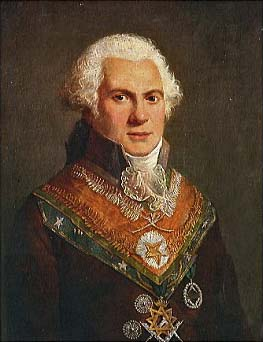
Alexandre Louis Roëttiers de Montaleau (1748–1807)

=== Origins (1723/25-1750) ===
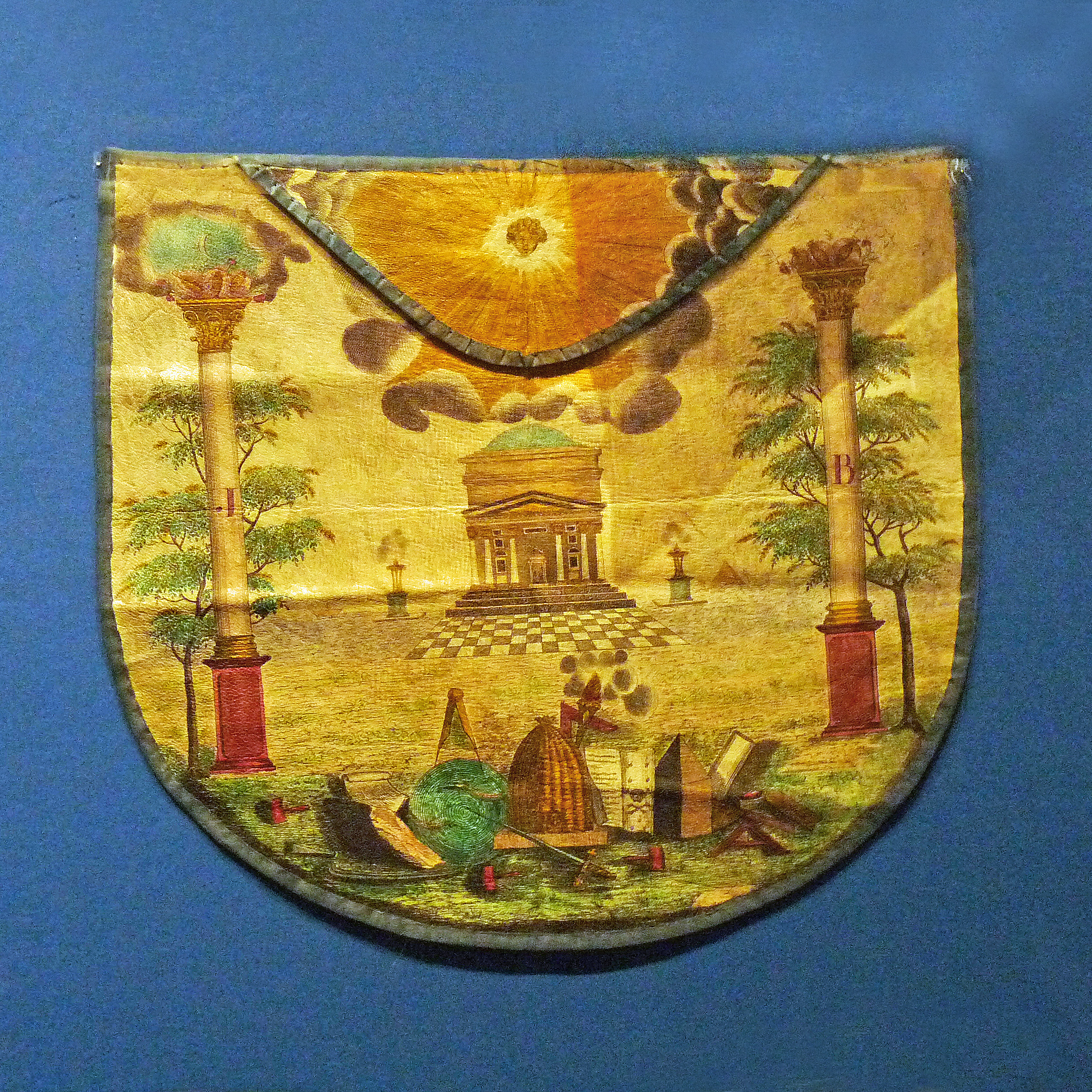
French Master's apron from the 19th century

The French Rite traces its origins to the introduction of speculative Freemasonry in France around 1723/25. As recorded by Jérôme de Lalande in his "Mémoire historique sur la Maçonnerie" (1777), the first documented lodge was established in Paris by English Freemasons, including "Milord Dervent-Waters, the chevalier Maskelyne, d'Heguerty, and several other Englishmen." This lodge met at Hurre's tavern, an English establishment in the Rue des Boucheries. Within a decade, it had attracted between five and six hundred members, leading to the establishment of additional lodges including Goustaud's (run by an English lapidary), the Louis d'Argent lodge, and the Bussy lodge (later renamed Aumont lodge when the Duke of Aumont became its Master).

The earliest French masonic practices are documented in a 1737 police report commissioned by René Hérault, Lieutenant General of Police in Paris. The report, obtained through surveillance involving a police informant known as Mademoiselle Carton, provides the first detailed description of French masonic ceremony. This document reveals that early French masonic ritual closely followed English "Premiere Grand Lodge" practices, including specific elements such as: The examination of candidates left to their reflection in a darkened chamber for about an hour, The removal of metals and partial disrobing and other ritualistic practices still used to this day.

Despite opposition from both civil and religious authorities, including a police ordinance in 1737 and Pope Clement XII's bull "In Eminenti" in 1738, French Freemasonry continued to grow. By 1742, there were twenty-two lodges in Paris and a similar number in the provinces.

=== Development and Codification (1773–1786) ===
A crucial period in the development of the French Rite began with the reformation of French Free-Masonry in 1772–1773 and the formation of the Grand Orient de France (GODF). This reorganization established the principle of collective sovereignty of Blue Lodges and introduced the election of Worshipful Masters by secret ballot, marking a significant departure from previous practices. Between 1781 and 1786, the GODF undertook the systematic codification of ritual practices. This work was primarily led by Alexandre-Louis Roëttiers de Montaleau (1748–1808), who was initiated in 1774 at the Lodge of Friendship in Paris. The Chamber of Grades (Chambre des Grades) was established to harmonize ritual practices while preserving their "ancient purity." This effort culminated in the adoption of standardized rituals for the three craft degrees in July and August 1785. A significant development occurred in 1784 when a group of 80 Brothers, including 27 GODF Officers, created the Grand Chapitre Général du Rite Français. This body was formally integrated into the GODF on February 17, 1786, by a vote of 39 to 7. The integration established a complete system of seven grades: the three craft degrees plus four Orders of Wisdom (Élu, Écossais, Chevalier d'Orient, and Rose-Croix). The Orders were carefully structured to provide a philosophical progression while avoiding excessive "sacerdotal" elements.

=== Revolutionary period, First Empire, and reorganization of the high grades (1789–1826) ===
The French Revolution severely disrupted organized Free-Masonry in France and interrupted the initial dissemination of the four higher Orders codified by the Grand Orient de France before 1789. Activity resumed under the Consulate and expanded considerably during the First Empire, when the Grand Orient again established chapters working the four Orders of the French Rite.

The introduction of the Ancient and Accepted Scottish Rite in Paris in 1804 did not cause French chapters simply to abandon their existing system because the new rite offered a greater number of degrees. Its appearance occurred within a much older dispute over the legitimacy, government, and centralization of the high grades. Several bodies claiming a "Scottish" character contested the Grand Orient’s authority and its codification of the higher Orders even before the establishment of the AASR.

Under pressure from the imperial authorities, the Grand Orient and the newly established "Scottish" bodies concluded a concordat on 5 December 1804. Historian Pierre Mollier characterizes this concordat principally as a political and administrative agreement between two governing powers rather than as an agreement concerning ritual doctrine. It incorporated the dignitaries of the Grande Loge Générale Écossaise and the Supreme Council into the organization of the Grand Orient and adapted the Grand Orient’s structures to the thirty-three-degree hierarchy. Within the resulting arrangement, the Scottish system became an administrative point of reference for the government of the high grades.

Although the formal union broke down in 1805, it had already established overlapping institutions and jurisdictions. The Grand Orient continued to administer both its four French Orders and the first eighteen degrees of the Scottish system. After 1815, the Grand Orient reasserted its authority over the Scottish high grades and used its existing administrative network to organize councils of Kadosh, consistories, and other bodies. Between approximately 1816 and 1826, it developed a stable model for the practice of the AASR in which a Free-Mason who had attained the Rose Croix could continue through the grades administered by councils of Kadosh and consistories. This development placed the Scottish continuation beyond Rose Croix within the same institutional environment that had previously governed the French Orders.

The subsequent decline of the four French Orders is therefore better understood as a gradual process of administrative integration, jurisdictional competition, and ritual convergence rather than as the result of the supposed attractiveness of the thirtieth and thirty-third degrees. Because the two systems were increasingly administered in parallel the distinction between a French and a Scottish progression became progressively blurred. The French Orders were increasingly treated as corresponding or preliminary stages within a broader system dominated above the Rose Croix by Scottish bodies. Over the course of the nineteenth century, the original ceremonies of the first three Orders were progressively abbreviated, communicated, bypassed, or allowed to fall out of regular practice, although the French Rite remained widely practiced in symbolic lodges and the full system remained practiced in other countries.

=== Nineteenth Century Evolution ===
The nineteenth century brought significant philosophical and structural changes to the French Rite. Between 1849 and 1877, the rite underwent a fundamental transformation regarding its relationship with religion. In 1849, the GODF had adopted principles requiring belief in God and the immortality of the soul. However, in 1877, these requirements were removed, establishing the principle of absolute freedom of conscience. This decision led to a break in relations with the United Grand Lodge of England, which viewed this change as a deviation from traditional masonic principles.

From 1887 onward, physical trials and certain symbolic elements were gradually replaced by rationalist discourses. However, this period also saw the development of various paramasonic practices, including funeral ceremonies, spousal recognitions, adoptions, and white (public) ceremonies (Private white ceremonies and public white ceremonies). In 1922, new closing formulas were introduced that remain in use today.

=== Recent Revival and Development (1938–Present) ===
A significant revival of the French Rite began under Arthur Groussier (1863–1957), who was initiated in 1885 at the Lodge L'Émancipation. As Grand Master of the GODF from 1925 to 1945, Groussier led a restoration of the rite's symbolic and initiatic character. His revised version of the ritual, adopted by the Council of the Order in 1938 and widely distributed in 1955, reintroduced many traditional elements while adapting them to contemporary sensibilities. The late twentieth century saw renewed interest in the complete French Rite system. In 1999, the GODF formally reconstituted the Grand Chapitre Général, restoring the original system of three degrees and four Orders of Wisdom. Today, the French Rite exists in several forms:

- The Premier French Rite (also called modern french rite) (closest to the original English practice, Modern is an allusion to Premier Free-Masonry)
- The Groussier Rite (considered the most secular version)
- The Restored Modern French Rite (seeking to recover 18th-century practices)
- The Traditional French Rite (also known as the Franco-Belgian Rite, rituals that were preserved in Belgium and returned to France)
- The Philosophical French Rite (adopted by GODF in 2002)

The French Rite remains the predominant form of Masonry within the GODF and French Freemasonry as a whole, in the GODF is it practiced by over 900 lodges and around 45,000 Masons, the rite is also practiced as a Major Rite in most French obediences. It has expanded beyond France's borders it is the dominant rite in Belgium, Luxembourg as well as other countries, and is practiced in South America, Africa and Asia Southern and Central Europe, and Africa, demonstrating its continued vitality and adaptability to different cultural contexts.

=== In Liberal Freemasonry ===
After the 1877 Great Schism, the Grand College of Rites of the Grand Orient de France decided on a new reform. This took place in 1879 and removed from the French Rite any formulas with religious connotations (such as the reference to the Grand Architect of the Universe and the duties towards God). An 1886 commission headed by Louis Amiable concluded an adogmatic form of the rite, giving it a hint of positivism — after this date the rite is known as the "Aimable French Rite". It underwent less important reforms in 1907, and then remained unchanged until 1938. In that year Arthur Groussier (Grand Master of the Grand Orient de France) began a new reform initiative in an attempt to return the rite to its roots after the sum of additions and suppressions which had rendered it hard-to-understand and soulless. The definitive version – known as the "Groussier French Rite" — was completed in 1955 under the authority of Paul Chevalier.

In the 1960s and 70s, several masons such as René Guilly sought the original essence of the French Rite and made a new attempt to reanimate its initiatory and symbolic character. René Guilly was the prime force behind the creation of a chapter of the Traditional French Rite, a chapter which still exists today within the National French Lodge. In 1974, another chapter was formed in Paris on the instigation of a member of the Traditional and Symbolic Grand Lodge of the Opéra. Through its offshoots, the latter led to the creation of a sovereign college of the Traditional French Rite, within a multi-jurisdiction framework.

== Structure, Degrees and Orders ==
=== Overview ===
The French Rite consists of a complete system of three degrees plus four orders, seven total grades, called an organized in two distinct categories: the three "blue" or craft degrees worked in symbolic lodges and established around 1724 (known as the rite), and four additional philosophical grades known as the Orders of Wisdom (Ordres de Sagesse) worked in chapters. This structure was formally established between 1784 and 1786 when the Grand Orient de France (GODF) codified the rituals and established the Grand Chapitre Général. The Orders of Wisdom are invitational only and are considered one of the most prestigious systems in Free-Masonry, it takes about seven to ten years to complete the four Orders.

Degrees/Grades and Orders of the French Rite
Category	Degree/Order Name	Main Themes & Symbolism	Historical Development
Blue Lodge Degrees (Grades Symboliques)	1° Apprenti (Entered Apprentice)	Transition from darkness to light, Inner reflection, preparing for transformation, Rough ashlar symbolism, Cardinal virtues, First masonic tools, Initial moral instruction, Passivity, Past, Learning and Silence	Established in France around 1724. First written down and documented in French practice in 1737 through the Hérault police report
Blue Lodge Degrees (Grades Symboliques)	2° Compagnon (Fellow Craft)	Expending outward, refining oneself, Liberal arts and sciences, Geometry and architecture, Letter G symbolism, Perfect ashlar, Five senses, Activity, Seeking to know thyself, Participation, Present	The discovery of the letter G was maintained as a second degree only aspect in the French rite
Blue Lodge Degrees (Grades Symboliques)	3° Maître (Master Mason)	Third degree legend, Going beyond oneself, Gather what is scattered, Master's tools, Future	Introduced to France circa 1730; formalized in current form by 1785
Orders of Wisdom (Ordres de Sagesse)
Chapter Orders	1st Order Maître Élu / Élu (Elect)	Justice over vengeance, Inner control over passions, Profound Moral transformation, red flames symbolism	Codified in 1784; revised in some jurisdiction during the 1999 restoration of Grand Chapitre Général.
Chapter Orders	2nd Order Grand Élu/ Écossais	Recovery, Self-worth based on inner self not outside elements, Completion of a cycle, Deep self construction Sacred geometry, reconstruction	Name derives from early French masonic tradition; content unrelated to Scottish masonry
Chapter Orders	3rd Order Chevalier Maçon/ Chevalier d'Orient (Knight of Masonry/ of the Orient)	Immutable core principals over any easy paths, Sword and Trowel, Foundational order of oneself Liberty and duty,	Incorporated elements from multiple 18th century "Oriental" degrees
Chapter Orders	4th Order Parfait Maçon Libre/ Rose-Croix (Perfect Sovereign Mason)	Universal philosophy re-integration Ultimate truth seeking Humanitarian ideals Freedom Masonic synthesis Ultimate version of oneself, profound transformation	Selected as summit Order in 1784; revised by the GODF after 1877 secularization, but maintained as original but the O Supremo Conselho do Rito Moderno and the Grand Chapitre Français.
Note: All Orders were codified between 1781 and 1786 by the Grand Orient de France

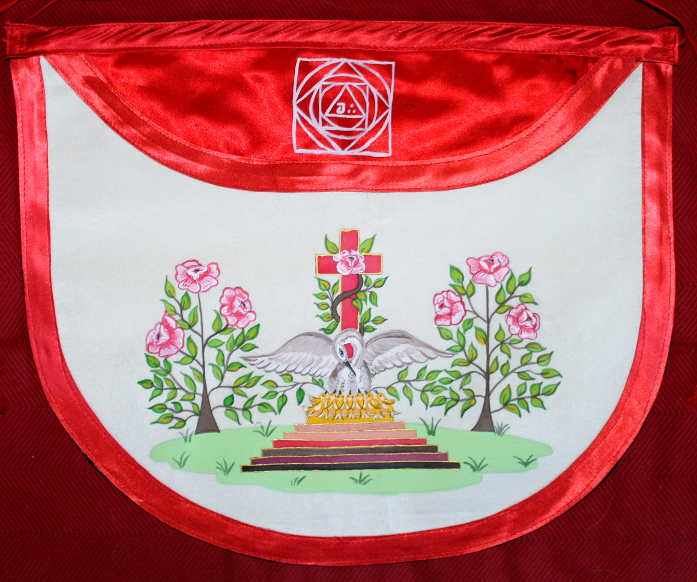
4th Order Apron

=== The Fifth Order (Le Ve Ordre) ===
The Fifth Order occupies a unique position within the French Rite system, created not as a grade for conferral but as a scholarly and administrative body. In the 1780s, as the Chamber of Grades (Chambre des Grades) worked zealously to codify the symbolic grades and select high grades rituals, they systematically selected, eliminated, and merged various grades to establish the four Orders of the French Rite: Élu, Écossais, Chevalier de l'Épée, and Rose-Croix. During this process, numerous grades were set aside, leading to the creation of a fifth Order within the Grand Metropolitan Chapter of the Grand Orient de France.

This Order was established as a venue for conversation and study or different ritual practices and history as a conservatory of the Orders of Wisdom, Scholar masons were sent all over France to research and find rituals, after they compiled over 1000 different rituals, they diligently studied them all, compiling them into different categories, relevance, historicity, falsification, authenticity and other criteria, out of over a thousand rituals and systems they retained only four Orders, for the Orders of Wisdom to be conferred and decided to keep 81 rituals to be studied by the fifth Order, only as historical curiosities to be preserved but not conferred.

The extensive collection of 81 rituals was methodically organized into nine series: the first series encompassing the most primitive grades (such as Intendant of Buildings); the second series containing the Élu grades; the third series comprising intermediate grades without posterity; the fourth and fifth series consisting of Scottish grades that served as models for the Second Order; the sixth series including chivalric grades; the seventh series providing models for the Rose-Croix; the eighth series containing grades like Knight of the Temple and Knight of the Sun; and the ninth series encompassing alchemical, hermetic, and other grades.

The Fifth Order developed a simple but effective structure, which, while incomplete in 1784, became fully active by 1808. Its governance centered on the Council of Nine, composed of Chapter members holding the highest grades, supported by three honorary officers. The Order's documents were secured in an ark at the Council's meeting place, protected by two keys – one held by the Council's dean and the other by a Council member.

A class of proselytes, limited to 81 members selected from the Metropolitan Chapter, operated alongside the Council. These proselytes received instruction only in the knowledge and light contained within the first eight series. The Order's regalia, defined in the April 29, 1808 session, consisted of a white moiré ribbon with gold edges, bearing a distinctive medal. This medal, gilt for Council members and Honorary Officers but silver-plated for proselytes, featured an ouroboros encircling a radiant triangle containing the name of God in Hebrew characters, with the number 5 at its summit.

The Order's activities ceased around 1813, when Adam (President), Vérité (Surveillant), and the Cherubim (Council members) conducted their final meetings. The Order remained dormant for approximately 150 years until its revival through the French Chapter of the French National Lodge under René Guilly-Désaguliers's leadership. The Grand Orient de France later adopted this initiative with a new approach, aiming to standardize and create coherence in the pathways of an obedience whose blue lodges predominantly practiced the French Rite (all were administratively created under this designation before some requested authorization to cumulate rites from the Council of the Order).

Today, the Fifth Order maintains its original purpose of researching and deepening understanding of the grades at the "summit" of the Rite. The rituals resulting from the Grand Chapitre Général's work demonstrate that masonic erudition can be practiced effectively in both modest and grand settings – "in a Romanesque chapel as well as in a Gothic cathedral." This unique institution continues to serve as both a repository of masonic knowledge and a center for ritual research and development within the French Rite tradition.

=== Historical development ===
The Orders of Wisdom experienced a significant decline in the early 19th century when many chapters transitioned to the newly established Ancient and Accepted Scottish Rite. They remained largely dormant until their revival in the late 20th century. In 1999, the GODF formally reconstituted the Grand Chapitre Général, restoring the complete seven-grade system to active practice. Today, the Grand Chapitre Général oversees more than 200 Chapters and 5,000 members. It maintains close relationships with other chapter structures, as evidenced by the signing of the Lisbon Charter in 2011 by 27 Grand Chapters and the activities of the Ramsay Committee.

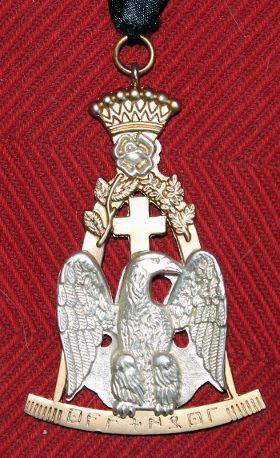
Jewels of the 4th Order

=== Recent Variants ===
The French Rite exists today in several major forms, each representing different approaches to masonic tradition and philosophy. These variants emerged through various historical developments and reforms, particularly during the 19th and 20th centuries.

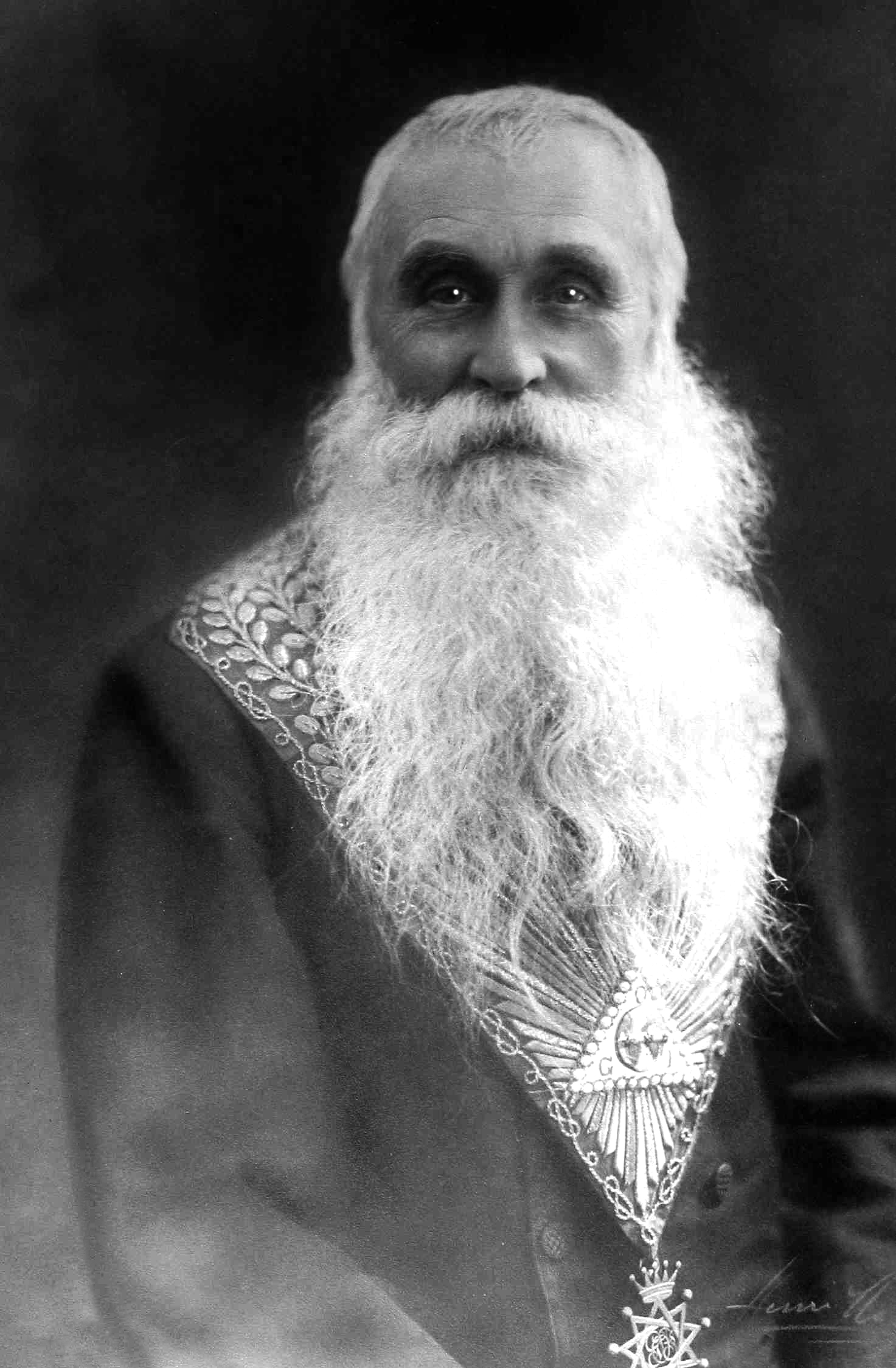
Arthur Groussier

While there exist many variations, the major ones are:

==== Groussier Rite ====
The Groussier variant, developed by Arthur Groussier between 1938 and 1955, represents a significant attempt to restore traditional elements to the French Rite while adapting them to modern sensibilities. As Grand Master of the Grand Orient de France from 1925 to 1945, Groussier sought to counter the extreme rationalist simplification that had characterized the rite's evolution during the late 19th century.

Notable features include:

- Reintroduction of traditional opening and closing ceremonies
- Restoration of physical trials in initiation
- Return of certain symbolic elements while maintaining secular principles
- Integration of Anderson's Constitutions references
- Simplified but meaningful chamber of reflection practices

The Groussier version remains the most widely practiced form within the Grand Orient de France, representing a balance between traditional masonic symbolism and contemporary philosophical approaches.

==== Traditional French Rite ====
The Traditional French Rite (Rite Français Traditionnel or RFT) emerged from research conducted by René Guilly and colleagues in the 1950s, aiming to recover the earliest forms of French masonic practice. This variant is characterized by:

- Strict adherence to documented 18th-century practices
- Maintenance of traditional religious elements
- Preservation of original chamber of reflection procedures
- Complex symbolic interpretations
- Emphasis on historical authenticity

The RFT is practiced primarily within the Loge Nationale Française and certain lodges of the Grande Loge Traditionnelle et Symbolique Opéra, representing what its practitioners consider the most authentic form of early speculative masonry.

==== Philosophical French Rite ====
Adopted by the Grand Orient de France in 2002, the Philosophical French Rite represents a modern synthesis attempting to combine historical authenticity with contemporary philosophical perspectives. Its distinctive features include:

- Enhanced focus on philosophical interpretation of symbols
- Integration of humanistic values
- Maintained traditional forms with modern interpretations
- Emphasis on progressive social thought
- Balance between ritual practice and intellectual exploration

This variant reflects the Grand Orient's effort to create a version of the rite that speaks to contemporary societal concerns while preserving essential masonic traditions.

==== Jurisdictional variations ====
Different masonic jurisdictions have adapted the French Rite to their specific needs and philosophical orientations:

Jurisdiction	Primary Variant	Notable Characteristics
Grand Orient de France	Groussier/Philosophical	Secular orientation, social engagement
Grande Loge Nationale Française	Traditional	Maintains religious elements, regular practice
Grande Loge Féminine de France	Modified Groussier	Adapted for feminine practice
Grande Loge Traditionnelle et Symbolique Opéra	Traditional	Historical authenticity focus
Belgian Masonic Jurisdictions	Franco-Belgian	Preserved historical elements

==== Comparative elements ====
While these variants share common roots, they differ in several key aspects:

Element	Groussier	Traditional	Philosophical
Religious References	Minimal	Maintained	Reinterpreted
Chamber of Reflection	Simplified	Traditional	Modified
Trials	Modified	Historical	Symbolic
Philosophical Emphasis	Moderate	Historical	Strong
Social Engagement	High	Limited	High

These variations reflect the French Rite's adaptability while maintaining its essential character as one of the oldest and most historically significant masonic ritual systems.

The continued evolution and adaptation of these variants demonstrates the French Rite's vitality and relevance to contemporary masonic practice, while their coexistence illustrates the rite's capacity to accommodate different approaches to masonic tradition and philosophy.

=== Jurisdictions ===
In the Grand Orient de France, 80% of the Lodges practice a version of the French Rite. In the Grande Loge Nationale Française, it is worked by approximately 15% of the lodges.

The French Rite is also very popular in Brazil and growing rapidly in Argentina.

It has spread to Belgium, Luxembourg, Brazil, the Netherlands, Greece, Spain and Switzerland (and formerly in Louisiana), although outside France it is mainly a minority Rite (especially found in lodges founded by the Grand Orient of France).

=== Spirituality ===
In the form practiced by the regular Grande Loge Nationale Française, it is the rite most similar to that of the 1717 Premier Grand Lodge [of London], one of the founding rites of Free-Masonry, perpetuating several fundamentals (such as the position of columns J and B and of the candlesticks around the lodge carpet, the 2 brief blows and one longer blow, the moving of the right foot) which the "Antient" lodge later changed it.

== See also ==
- List of Masonic Rites
- Rite of Memphis-Misraim
- Adonhiramite Rite
- Ancient and Accepted Scottish Rite
- Ancient and Primitive Rite
- Primitive Scottish Rite
- Rectified Scottish Rite
- Standard Scottish Rite
