= Louis Amiable =

French lawyer, magistrate, writer and Free-Mason (1837–1897)

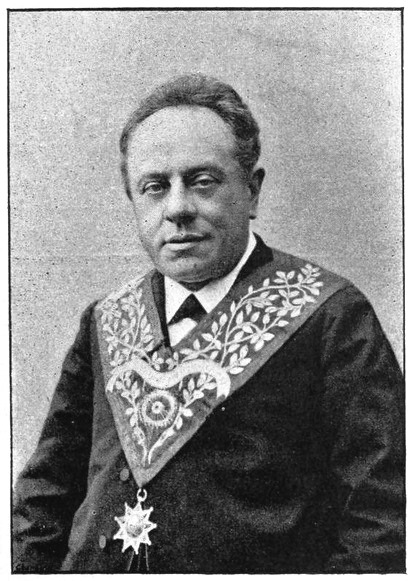
- Louis Amiable, before 1897

Mayor of the 5th arrondissement of Paris
- In office 1888–1891

Personal details
- Born: Jean-Baptiste-Hippolyte-Louis Amiable; 16 February 1837 Montbrison, France
- Died: 23 January 1897 (aged 59) Aix-en-Provence, France
- Resting place: Cimetière du Château, Nice
- Occupation: Lawyer, magistrate and writer
- Awards: Legion of Honour

Louis Amiable (16 February 1837 – 23 January 1897) was a French lawyer, magistrate, writer, municipal official and Free-Mason. After practising law in Constantinople during the 1860s and 1870s, he returned to France, served on the governing bodies of the Grand Orient de France, and became mayor of the 5th arrondissement of Paris.

Within French Free-Masonry, Amiable is principally associated with the revision of the French Rite undertaken by a twelve-member commission of the Grand Orient de France. The commission, which he chaired, completed its work in 1886; the resulting texts were issued in 1887 and became conventionally known as the Amiable rituals. The revision consolidated the secular and non-dogmatic direction adopted by the Grand Orient after 1877 and expressed it through a ritual vocabulary influenced by nineteenth-century rationalism and positivism. Amiable was also a historian of Free-Masonry. His 1897 study of the lodge Les Neuf Sœurs remained an important, though subsequently criticised and re-evaluated, documentary work on eighteenth-century French Free-Masonry.

== Early life and legal career ==
Amiable was born at Montbrison in the Loire department on 16 February 1837. He studied law in Paris, received a faculty prize in 1859 and obtained his doctorate in law in 1861. His early publications dealt with legal history and public law, including the status of illegitimate children under the old French law and questions of political responsibility.

In 1864 he settled in Constantinople, then the capital of the Ottoman Empire, where he practised as a lawyer. He helped establish the Société du Barreau de Constantinople and served as its president from 1872 to 1874. From 1875 to 1879 he acted as a legal adviser to the Sublime Porte. His professional position brought him into contact with Ottoman administrators, diplomats, lawyers and members of the capital's multilingual European and Levantine communities.

Amiable later wrote about the institutional and legal questions he had encountered in the Ottoman Empire. His Constantinople experience also formed an important part of his Free-Masonic career and informed his later interest in Free-Masonry as an international network.

== Free-Masonry in Constantinople ==
=== Union d'Orient ===
Amiable was affiliated with Union d'Orient, a lodge in Constantinople under the Grand Orient de France. He served as its Worshipful Master from 1865 to 1870. The lodge was founded in 1862 and belonged to a group of lodges through which French, Italian, British and other European Free-Masonic systems operated in the Ottoman capital.

Under Amiable's leadership, Union d'Orient sought to recruit beyond the Christian and Jewish communities that had initially provided much of the membership of European-chartered lodges in the empire. The lodge admitted Muslim civil servants, military officers and intellectuals, and its ritual and constitutional material was translated into Turkish so that Ottoman members could participate more fully.

The policy produced a socially prominent and religiously diverse membership. Historian Paul Dumont records that Union d'Orient had 143 members in 1869, including 53 high-ranking Muslims. The lodge's openness should not, however, be interpreted solely as religious universalism. Scholarship on Ottoman Free-Masonry also places Union d'Orient within the cultural and political competition among European powers, whose lodges promoted their languages, diplomatic interests and models of reform.

Amiable revisited this period in De la situation maçonnique à Constantinople, en Grèce et en Italie, published in 1895.

== Return to France and public career ==
After returning permanently to France, Amiable combined legal, political, journalistic and Free-Masonic activity. He contributed to periodicals including the Journal des économistes, the Progrès de Lyon, Léon Gambetta's La République française and Georges Clemenceau's La Justice.

He was appointed mayor of the 5th arrondissement of Paris in 1888. The position was appointive rather than elective under the municipal system then governing the Paris arrondissements. Amiable remained in office until 1891, when ill health led him to resign. In November 1892 he was appointed a counsellor at the Court of Appeal of Aix-en-Provence.

He was made a Knight of the Legion of Honour on 13 July 1891. He also received Ottoman decorations, including the rank of commander in the Order of the Medjidie and grand officer in the Order of Glory.

== Career in the Grand Orient de France ==
In Paris, Amiable belonged to the lodge Isis-Montyon and became one of the prominent administrators and writers of the Grand Orient de France during the early Third Republic. He served on the Council of the Order, the executive governing body of the Grand Orient, from 1884, and also belonged to the Grand Collège des Rites, which administered the higher grades practised under its authority.

His activity took place during a major transformation of the Grand Orient. In 1877 its convent removed from its constitution the requirement that Free-Masonry affirm the existence of God and the immortality of the soul. The decision established liberty of conscience as the governing principle and did not formally require individual lodges or members to adopt atheism. In 1879, the Grand Collège des Rites began removing explicitly religious formulas from the Grand Orient's ritual texts.

Amiable's ritual revision followed these institutional decisions. He neither initiated the 1877 constitutional change nor acted alone in rewriting the ceremonies. His particular importance was as chairman and principal redactor of the commission that translated the Grand Orient's new philosophical position into a systematic edition of the French Rite.

== Revision of the French Rite ==
=== The twelve-member commission ===
The Council of the Order appointed a commission of twelve members, chaired by Amiable, to revise the rituals used by the Grand Orient's symbolic lodges. The commission completed and presented its work in 1886, and the revised texts appeared in 1887. For this reason, historical accounts variously date the “Amiable ritual” to 1886 or 1887: the first date refers to the institutional completion and adoption of the project, while the second refers to the edition in which it circulated.

The edition was not a wholly new rite. It was a revision of the French Rite already practised by the Grand Orient and codified in the late eighteenth and early nineteenth centuries. The texts continued to use the three symbolic grades of Apprentice, Fellow Craft and Master, but altered their explanatory language, moral lessons and treatment of symbols.

Although the resulting corpus became known as the “Ritual Amiable” or “Amiable rituals”, the name is conventional rather than evidence of sole authorship. Modern histories identify Amiable as the commission's president, principal writer, promoter and public interpreter.

=== Secular and positivist orientation ===
Amiable argued that ritual symbolism should be comprehensible and neutral among competing religious and metaphysical beliefs. The revision accordingly reduced or removed formulas that presupposed a revealed religion, divine intervention or personal immortality. In their place, it emphasised conscience, reason, morality, solidarity, the search for truth and the improvement of humanity.

The revision was influenced by the intellectual climate of the Third Republic, especially rationalism and positivism. Its lectures sometimes interpreted traditional symbols through contemporary scientific, social or moral concepts rather than leaving them open to multiple initiatory readings. The lodge was presented not only as a place of symbolic initiation but also as a school of civic ethics and social progress.

The word non-dogmatic in this context denotes institutional neutrality regarding theological belief. It does not mean that every member of the Grand Orient was an atheist, nor that every lodge understood the ritual identically. The revised rite allowed believers, agnostics and atheists to work under a common rule of liberty of conscience.

=== Changes to ritual method ===
The Amiable revision retained much of the visible framework of the French Rite but recast its interpretation. It simplified some ceremonies, supplied rational and moral explanations for symbols, and reduced elements considered obscure, frightening or inconsistent with the commission's pedagogical aims.

This approach was praised by supporters as clear, republican and compatible with intellectual freedom. Critics considered it overly didactic and argued that it transformed symbols into fixed allegories, diminished the initiatory experience and made the ceremonies dependent on the scientific and social assumptions of the 1880s.

The revision therefore occupies an ambivalent position in French Rite history. It preserved the institutional continuity of the rite during the secular transformation of the Grand Orient, but it also moved significantly away from the density and ambiguity of the eighteenth-century ritual tradition.

=== Later revisions and legacy ===
The Amiable texts remained a major reference for Grand Orient lodges but were not the final form of the French Rite. A further revision was associated with Jean-Baptiste Blatin in 1907. From 1938, Arthur Groussier led a movement to restore a greater degree of traditional symbolism while maintaining the Grand Orient's commitment to liberty of conscience. The resulting Groussier ritual gradually replaced the more explicitly positivist approach of the Amiable period.

Amiable's lasting influence is therefore not that all present-day French Rite workings reproduce his text. Rather, his commission gave a coherent ritual expression to the Grand Orient's post-1877 non-dogmatic identity and established an important stage in the documented evolution from the nineteenth-century French Rite to its twentieth-century forms.

== Free-Masonic historical writing ==
Amiable treated Free-Masonry as a subject of historical and institutional study as well as personal commitment. In 1889 he and Jean-Claude Colfavru delivered an account of French Free-Masonry to an international Free-Masonic congress; it was published as La Franc-Maçonnerie en France depuis 1725: exposé historique et doctrinal. The work combined historical narrative with an official presentation of the principles then defended by the Grand Orient.

His best-known historical work was Une loge maçonnique d'avant 1789: la R. L. Les Neuf Sœurs, published in 1897. The book reconstructed the history and membership of Les Neuf Sœurs, the Paris lodge associated with Jérôme Lalande, Benjamin Franklin, Voltaire and several writers and intellectuals of the late Enlightenment.

The study became a standard source because Amiable had access to records that were subsequently dispersed or lost. Later historians nevertheless criticised some of his conclusions, his tendency to idealise the lodge's Enlightenment role and his insufficient distinction between documented membership and later tradition. Charles Porset produced a critically annotated edition in 1989, preserving the documentary value of Amiable's work while correcting or qualifying a number of claims.

Amiable also wrote biographical and historical studies of Free-Masonic figures, including the astronomer Jérôme Lalande, and examined the relationship between Free-Masonry and the French magistracy before the Revolution.

== Selected works ==
- Amiable, Louis (1861). De la condition des enfants illégitimes dans l'ancien droit français (in French). Paris.
- Amiable, Louis (1889). Le Franc-Maçon Jérôme Lalande (in French). Paris: Imprimerie du Grand Orient de France.
- Amiable, Louis; Colfavru, Jean-Claude (1889). La Franc-Maçonnerie en France depuis 1725: exposé historique et doctrinal (in French). Paris: Secrétariat général du Grand Orient de France.
- Amiable, Louis (1894). La Franc-Maçonnerie et la magistrature en France à la veille de la Révolution (in French). Aix-en-Provence: Imprimerie Remondet-Aubin.
- Amiable, Louis (1895). De la situation maçonnique à Constantinople, en Grèce et en Italie (in French). Aix-en-Provence: Imprimerie Remondet-Aubin.
- Amiable, Louis (1897). Une loge maçonnique d'avant 1789: la R. L. Les Neuf Sœurs (in French). Paris: Félix Alcan.

== Death ==
Amiable died at Aix-en-Provence on 23 January 1897, aged 59. He was buried in the Cimetière du Château at Nice.

== Assessment ==
Amiable's importance to the French Rite rests on three distinct contributions. As a lodge leader in Constantinople, he promoted a multilingual and religiously mixed form of lodge membership. As an administrator of the Grand Orient de France, he helped give ritual form to its principle of liberty of conscience. As a historian, he preserved information about eighteenth-century French lodges and Free-Masons, although later scholarship has revised some of his interpretations.

It is therefore imprecise to describe Amiable either as the creator of the French Rite or merely as the person who removed religious references from it. The rite predated him by more than a century, and its secular revision had begun before his commission. His documented role was to chair and guide the commission that systematised those changes in the 1886–1887 edition that bears his name.

== See also ==
- French Rite
- Grand Orient de France
- Les Neuf Sœurs
- Free-Masonry in France
- Arthur Groussier
