= Premier Free-Masonry =

Eighteenth-century Free-Masonic tradition associated with the first Grand Lodge of England

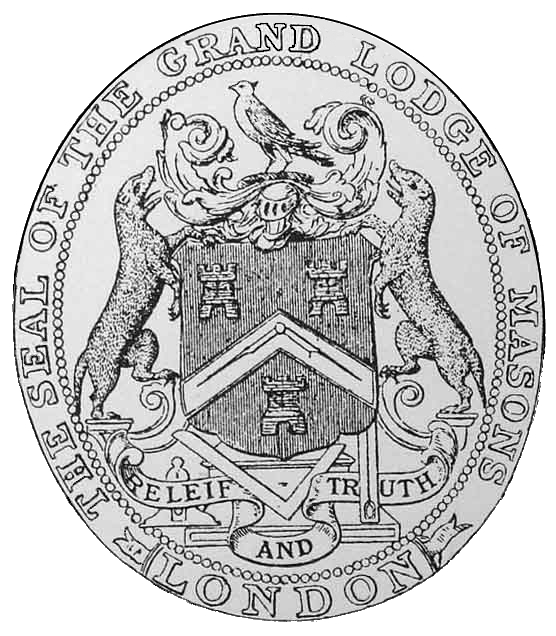
Seal associated with the body now conventionally called the Premier Grand Lodge of England. Its members were labelled “Moderns” by a rival Grand Lodge founded in 1751.

Premier Free-Masonry is a historiographical designation for the constitutional and ritual current associated with the first Grand Lodge formed in London in 1717 (although recently contested for the date of 1721 instead), now conventionally called the Premier Grand Lodge of England. From the 1750s, the rival Grand Lodge founded in 1751 called its own members the Antients to add legitimacy to their newly created Grand Lodge and applied the derogatory name Moderns to the members of the older body as a attempt to disqualify the older Grand Lodge. The expressions Modern Free-Masonry and Free-Masonry of the Moderns therefore do not describe a chronologically later form of Free-Masonry: they reproduce a polemical name created by a later competitor.

The Premier current was transmitted to France during the earliest expansion of organised speculative Free-Masonry in the 1720s and 1730s. The practices subsequently organised and codified as the French Rite developed principally from that transmission. Historians of the rite, including Ludovic Marcos, describe it as a direct heir of the speculative Free-Masonry established around the end of the seventeenth and beginning of the eighteenth centuries, while Cécile Révauger identifies the early French symbolic workings as closely corresponding to those of the English "Moderns". In a narrow ritual-historical sense, the French Rite is consequently presented by some authors as the only, or the principal, separately identifiable surviving rite directly descended from Premier Free-Masonry. That proposition does not imply that it is the sole institutional descendant of the 1717 Grand Lodge, since the United Grand Lodge of England was created in 1813 by the union of the Premier and Antient Grand Lodges.

== Terminology ==
=== Premier Free-Masonry ===
The Grand Lodge formed at London on 24 June 1717 (although some recent scholarly research suggest 1721) did not call its system "Modern Free-Masonry". It was the first organisation of its kind and initially required no adjective distinguishing it from a rival English Grand Lodge. The modern expression "Premier Grand Lodge of England" is a retrospective historical name used to distinguish the body founded in 1717 from the Grand Lodge established in 1751 and from the united organisation created in 1813.

"Premier Free-Masonry" may therefore be used for the culture, organisation, ritual family, and constitutional outlook associated with the first Grand Lodge and its affiliated lodges. It is broader than the institutional history of the Grand Lodge itself because the same ritual current circulated outside England, particularly in France, before being codified there as a named rite.

=== "Moderns" as a polemical label ===
The word "Moderns" originated in the conflict between the two English Grand Lodges. The later organisation represented itself as preserving "Antient" Free-Masonry and accused the older Grand Lodge of having altered established usages. Aubrey Newman notes that the Antients "bestowed" the "odious name of Moderns" upon their opponents. The label was therefore not a neutral chronological classification created by later historians. It was an adversarial claim to legitimacy. Since the Premier Grand Lodge did not have a specific name for themselves, just Free-Masons, the derogatory label of the other grand Lodge was widely adopted creating confusion on the timeline.

The rhetoric inverted the actual chronology:

- the Grand Lodge later called "Modern" had been formed in 1717 (1721);
- the self-styled Antient Grand Lodge was formed in 1751, thirty-four years later;
- most of the founders of the 1751 body were Irish Free-Masons living in London rather than members who had seceded from the older Grand Lodge.

In this context, describing the name as a form of propaganda means that it functioned as institutional branding: "Antient" claimed authenticity and continuity for the newer organisation, while "Modern" suggested novelty and deviation in the older one. Encyclopedic treatment normally uses the less evaluative expression "polemical label", while explaining the propagandistic purpose attributed to it by historians.

The spelling Antients reflects the archaising form used by the eighteenth-century organisation. Ancients is a common modernisation.

== Formation of the Premier current ==
=== The Grand Lodge of 1717 (1721) ===
According to the conventional institutional history, four London lodges met at the Goose and Gridiron tavern on 24 June 1717 and established the first Grand Lodge. In 1723 it published the first edition of the Constitutions of the Free-Masons, traditionally associated with James Anderson and John Theophilus Desaguliers. The volume contained a legendary history, general obligations, regulations, and songs. It helped transform a network of lodges into a more visible and reproducible form of organised speculative Free-Masonry.

The Premier Grand Lodge promoted a structure in which lodges recognised a central authority, followed common constitutional rules, corresponded with one another, and participated in public or semi-public sociability. Its rapid expansion encouraged the establishment of lodges beyond London and outside England.

=== Ritual development ===
Early eighteenth-century Free-Masonic ritual was not controlled through a single printed and universally enforced text. Instruction was largely oral, and surviving exposures, manuscripts, lodge records, and catechisms show both broad common features and local variation. Samuel Prichard's Masonry Dissected, published in 1730, is one of the most important early printed exposures of the three-grade system, but it cannot by itself be treated as the official ritual of every lodge.

The Premier Grand Lodge altered certain modes of recognition after ritual information had become publicly available. These changes, especially those associated with the late 1730s, later became a central charge in Antient criticism. The surviving evidence nevertheless does not support a simple division between a completely uniform "Modern" ritual and a completely uniform "Antient" ritual. Newman emphasises local diversity, contact between lodges, and the exchange of practices across institutional boundaries.

== The self-styled Antients ==
=== Foundation and social background ===
The rival Grand Lodge was organised in London in 1751. Its early membership drew heavily from Irish Free-Masons who found themselves excluded from, or dissatisfied with, the social and ritual culture of lodges affiliated with the Premier Grand Lodge. The new body was not primarily a secession of Premier lodges; it developed as a separate organisation serving a partly different Free-Masonic population.

Laurence Dermott, who became Grand Secretary, gave the organisation much of its identity. His Ahiman Rezon, first published in 1756, supplied constitutions for the new Grand Lodge while using satire and invective against the older body. Dermott's rhetoric portrayed the Premier Grand Lodge as having abandoned authentic usages and helped establish the opposition between "Antient" and "Modern".

=== The paradox of Antient innovation ===
The self-description "Antient" did not mean that every practice of the 1751 organisation could be documented as older than those of the Premier Grand Lodge. Some Antient usages reflected Irish practice, and some may have preserved customs absent from London lodges affiliated with the Premier body. At the same time, the Antients adopted or strongly promoted features that were comparatively new within organised English Free-Masonry.

Newman identifies several important differences. Antient lodges used deacons, attached greater importance to the formal installation of the Master, and treated the Holy Royal Arch as an essential completion of the Master grade. The Premier Grand Lodge did not originally accept the Royal Arch as part of Craft Free-Masonry. Newman consequently concludes that the Antients introduced more innovations than the Moderns, particularly through their development and promotion of the Royal Arch.

The Antients were therefore "more modern" in a limited chronological and organisational sense: their Grand Lodge was newer, and several practices central to their identity were more recently institutionalised. This does not prove that all Premier usages were older or that every Antient practice was invented after 1751. It demonstrates instead that the names "Antient" and "Modern" were claims made within a controversy, not objective dates assigned to two fixed ritual systems.

== Transmission to France ==
=== The first French lodges ===
Speculative Free-Masonry reached France through British and Irish residents, political exiles, travellers, merchants, and military networks during the 1720s and 1730s. The earliest French lodges appeared before the English Antient Grand Lodge existed. Their basic symbolic practices consequently belonged to the ritual world of the first English Grand Lodge and of closely related British workings rather than to the later institutional system created in 1751.

Révauger describes the symbolic work practised in French lodges as a rite similar to that of the English Moderns. At this stage it was not normally called the "French Rite". It was simply the ordinary form of Free-Masonry transmitted and adapted in France. A distinctive name became useful only after several competing systems, particularly those described as "Scottish", had spread through the French Free-Masonic world.

French practice was not a mechanical copy of one London ceremony. Translation, oral transmission, local custom, changing lodge furnishings, and the rapid creation of additional grades produced a specifically French ritual culture. Nevertheless, the symbolic foundation remained recognisably connected to the Premier current.

=== From common practice to a named rite ===
During the eighteenth century, French lodges accumulated numerous manuscript rituals and additional grades. The reorganisation that created the Grand Orient de France in 1773 was followed by an effort to compare, classify, and regularise this material. The expression "French Rite" gradually distinguished the common French symbolic system from newer or competing rites; it was not the original name of the practices introduced in the 1720s.

This development is important to the concept of Premier Free-Masonry. The French Rite was codified late in the eighteenth century, but the material being codified was older. The date of codification therefore should not be confused with the date of ritual origin.

== The French Rite as the ritual heir of Premier Free-Masonry ==
=== Codification of the symbolic grades ===
The Grand Orient of France established bodies charged with examining the rituals used by its lodges. Its Chamber of Grades compared manuscripts and sought to produce a coherent reference system rather than create a wholly new rite. Under the influence of figures including Alexandre Roëttiers de Montaleau, the Grand Orient adopted reference texts for Apprentice, Fellow Craft, and Master in 1785.

These texts are known principally through Le Régulateur du Maçon, whose title reflects the adoption of the symbolic corpus in 1785 and its printed publication in 1801. Pierre Mollier's documentary study traces the sources of the Régulateur to the early speculative tradition of the 1720s, while also identifying subsequent French developments.

Codification froze neither a completely unchanged 1717 ceremony nor a single ritual practised identically throughout France. It created an authorised synthesis from a family of French workings descended principally from the earlier English current. This distinction permits historians to speak of direct descent without claiming word-for-word identity.

=== The Orders of Wisdom ===
The French Rite was organised as more than three symbolic grades. The Grand Chapitre Général de France was constituted in 1784 and was integrated into the Grand Orient of France in 1786. It selected and arranged four chapter grades as the Orders of Wisdom:

1. First Order: Secret Elect;
2. Second Order: Grand Elect Ecossais;
3. Third Order: Knight Mason or Knight of the Orient;
4. Fourth Order: Free and Perfect Mason, Knight of the Eagle or Rose-Croix.

A Fifth Order served as a scholarly, administrative, and conservatory body charged with studying and classifying the wider inheritance of additional grades rather than functioning simply as another ceremony placed after the Fourth Order. Révauger describes the resulting architecture as seven principal stages—three symbolic grades and four Orders—with the Fifth Order preserving and organising the larger corpus.

The Orders were assembled from the French additional-grade culture of the eighteenth century and therefore cannot be traced exclusively to the ceremonies of the Premier Grand Lodge. The claim of direct descent applies most precisely to the symbolic foundation of the French Rite. The complete rite combines that Premier foundation with a French systematisation of the additional grades.

=== Continuity and later reforms ===
The French Rite changed after its eighteenth-century codification. Nineteenth-century editions simplified, expanded, moralised, or secularised portions of the ceremonies creating different versions of the French Rite. In 1877 the Grand Orient of France removed the constitutional requirement for explicit belief in God and the immortality of the soul, replacing it with an affirmation of absolute freedom of conscience. This decision affected some later forms of the rite but did not erase the older documentary corpus.

The ritual associated with Louis Aimable in the late nineteenth century reflected positivist and civic influences. During the twentieth century, Arthur Groussier promoted a return to a more symbolic form while retaining the Grand Orient's freedom-of-conscience position. Other researchers, notably René Guilly, reconstructed versions based more strictly on eighteenth-century documents. These developments produced several contemporary families, commonly described as the Groussier, Traditional, Restored Modern, Philosophical and related forms of the French Rite.

=== The claim of exclusive descent ===
Marcos states that the French Rite is the direct heir of speculative Free-Masonry as it took shape around the end of the seventeenth and beginning of the eighteenth centuries, and describes it as a conservatory of early usages. Révauger similarly presents the French Rite as the heir of the Grand Lodge founded in 1717/1721 and connects its culture to the Enlightenment environment of early organised Free-Masonry.

On this basis, French Rite historiography characterises the rite as the only direct descendant of Premier Free-Masonry.

- the rite's symbolic foundation derives from the French transmission of pre-1751 English speculative practice;
- that foundation was codified as a distinct, named ritual system before the English union of 1813;
- the resulting 1785 corpus remains identifiable and has been repeatedly restored from its surviving documents;
- unlike the English post-union ritual, it was not originally constructed as a compromise between the Premier and Antient Grand Lodges.

The French Rite's distinctive status is not that no other tradition contains Premier elements, but that it survives as the principal separately named and documented rite whose symbolic identity is expressly grounded in the French continuation of the Premier current without "anctients" influences.

== The Union of 1813 ==
By the beginning of the nineteenth century, the two English Grand Lodges were moving towards union pushed by the 1799 act. In 1809 the Premier Grand Lodge created the Lodge of Promulgation to determine the "ancient landmarks" and prepare ritual reconciliation. During this process it reversed some earlier changes and accepted practices associated with the Antients, including deacons and a formal installation ceremony.

The two organisations united on 27 December 1813 to form the United Grand Lodge of England. The settlement incorporated the Royal Arch within the broader definition of "pure Antient Masonry" while presenting the Craft as consisting of three grades only which was a premier landmark. Newman argues that, in ritual matters, the settlement required substantial adaptation by the former premier and approved several Antient positions, although the governance of the united organisation remained strongly influenced by officers and structures inherited from the Premier Grand Lodge.

The union therefore created a synthesis with many removed parts, rather than a simple continuation of an untouched Premier ritual. This is the principal basis for contrasting the English post-1813 system with the French Rite's separately codified line of descent.

== Historiography ==
"Premier Free-Masonry" is consequently most useful as the name of a historical current, not as the title of one perfectly standardised ritual. It identifies:

- the constitutional culture generated by the first Grand Lodge;
- the ritual family visible in early eighteenth-century English sources;
- the version of that family carried into France before the foundation of the Antient Grand Lodge;
- the principal foundation later codified as the French Rite.

== See also ==
- Premier Grand Lodge of England
- Antient Grand Lodge of England
- United Grand Lodge of England
- French Rite
- Orders of Wisdom
- Constitutions of the Free-Masons
- History of Free-Masonry
- Free-Masonic ritual and symbolism
