= Freemasonry =

Group of fraternal organizations

The Square and Compasses, the main emblem of the Freemasons

Freemasonry (sometimes spelled Free-Masonry) consists of fraternal groups that trace their origins to medieval guilds of stonemasons. Freemasonry is considered the oldest existing secular fraternal organisation, with documents and traditions dating back to the 14th century. The core tenets of freemasonry are Brotherly Love, Relief, and Truth.

Modern Freemasonry broadly consists of three main recognition groups: Regular Freemasonry, which is the largest body and forms the majority of organised freemasonry worldwide. It follows the traditional practices of Freemasonry, insisting that a "volume of sacred law", such as the Bible, the Quran, or other religious scripture be open in a working lodge, that every member professes belief in a supreme being, that no women be admitted, and that discussion of religion or politics does not take place within the lodge; Liberal or Continental Freemasonry, which is globally much smaller in size and consists of the jurisdictions that have removed some, or all, of these traditional requirements; and Women’s and Mixed-Gender Freemasonry (Co-Freemasonry), which includes organizations that either admit women exclusively (such as the Order of Women Freemasons and the Honourable Fraternity of Ancient Freemasons in the UK) or accept both men and women (such as Le Droit Humain). These lodges are not officially recognized by Regular Freemasonry but operate independently, often deviating from the traditional practices of Freemasonry, but following similar Masonic rules, regulations, rituals and traditions (sometimes sharing buildings, such as Freemasons' Hall in London).

The basic, local organisational unit of Freemasonry is the Lodge. Lodges are usually supervised at the regional level by a Grand Lodge (or, sometimes, a Grand Orient). There is no international, worldwide Grand Lodge that supervises all of Freemasonry; each grand lodge is independent, and they do not necessarily recognise each other as being legitimate. However, The United Grand Lodge of England (UGLE), which dates back to June 1717, is the oldest Grand Lodge and is universally regarded as the Mother Grand Lodge of organised Freemasonry, recognising 246 Foreign Grand Lodges across the world. Recognition in the masonic sense considers their practice of freemasonry and the nature of the Grand Lodges formation.

The degrees of Freemasonry are the three grades of medieval craft guilds: Entered Apprentice, Journeyman or Fellow of the craft, and Master Mason. The candidate of these three degrees is progressively taught the meanings of the symbols of Freemasonry and entrusted with grips, signs, and words to signify to other members that he has been so initiated. The degrees are part allegorical morality play and part lecture. These three degrees form Craft Freemasonry, and members of any of these degrees are known as Free-Masons, Freemasons, or Masons. Once the Craft degrees have been conferred upon a Mason, he is qualified to join various "Concordant bodies" which offer additional degrees. These organisations are usually administered separately from the Grand Lodges who administer the Craft degrees. The extra degrees vary with locality and jurisdiction. In addition to these bodies, there are further organisations outside of the more traditional rites of Freemasonry that require an individual to be a Master Mason before they can join.

Throughout its history Freemasonry has received criticism and opposition on religious, moral and political grounds. The Catholic Church, some Protestant denominations and certain Islamic countries or entities have expressed opposition to or banned membership in Freemasonry. Opposition to Freemasonry is sometimes rooted in antisemitism or conspiracy theories, and Freemasons have been persecuted by authoritarian states.

== Masonic lodge ==
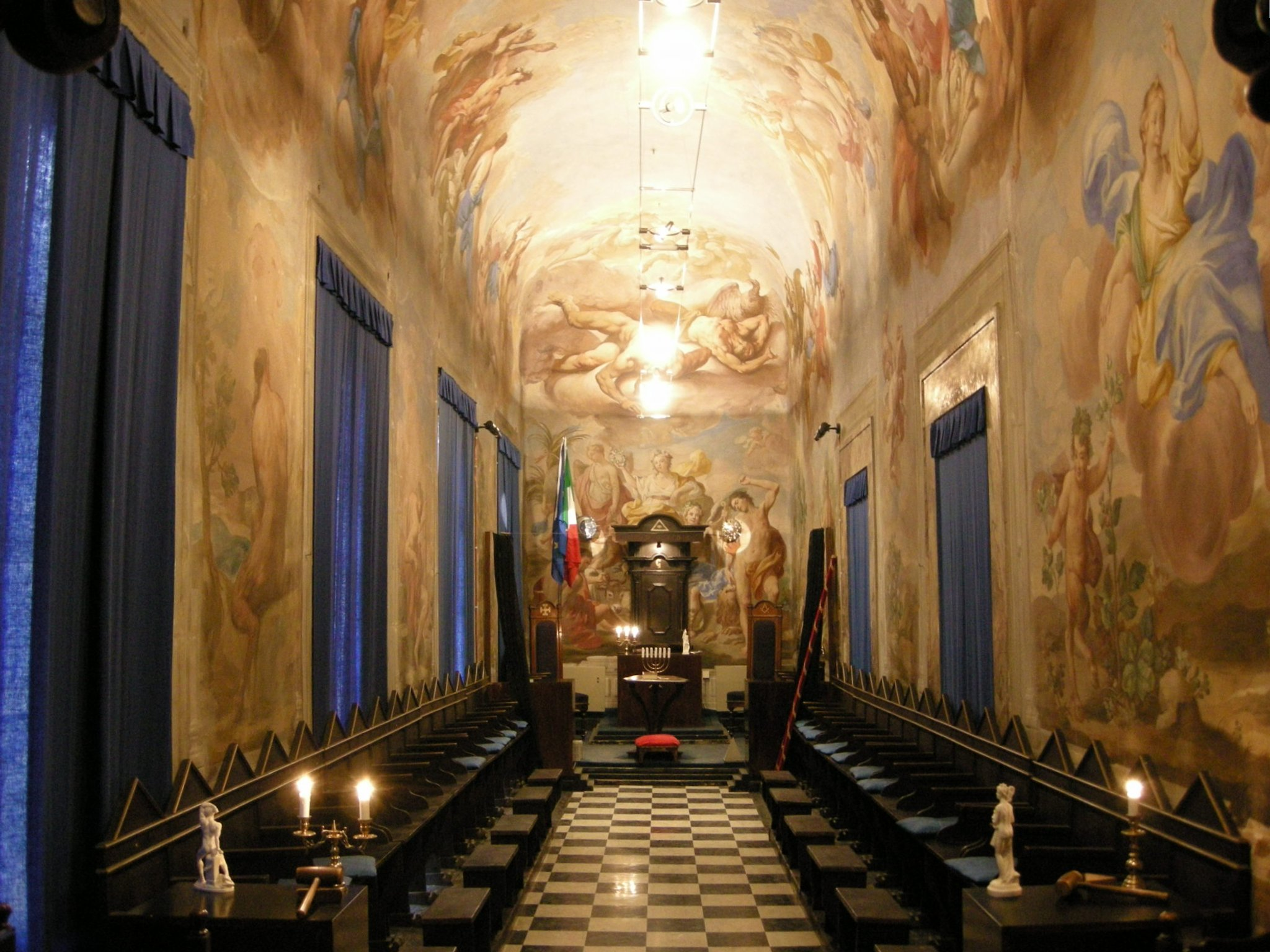
Lodge in Palazzo Roffia, Florence, set out for French (Premiere Grand Lodge) ritual

The Masonic lodge is the basic organisational unit of Freemasonry. The Lodge meets regularly and conducts the usual formal business of any small organisation (approve minutes, elect new members, appoint officers and take their reports, consider correspondence, bills and annual accounts, organise social and charitable events, etc.). In addition to such business, the meeting may perform a ceremony to confer a Masonic degree or receive a lecture, which is usually on some aspect of Masonic history or ritual. At the conclusion of the meeting, the Lodge may hold a formal dinner, or festive board, sometimes involving toasting and song. These meetings are typically held in a Masonic temple, though other venues may occasionally be used.

The bulk of Masonic ritual consists of degree ceremonies. Candidates for Freemasonry are progressively initiated into Freemasonry, first in the degree of Entered Apprentice. At some later time, in separate ceremonies, they will be passed to the degree of Fellowcraft; and then raised to the degree of Master Mason. In each of these ceremonies, the candidate must first take the new obligations of the degree, and is then entrusted with secret knowledge including passwords, signs and grips (secret handshakes) confined to his new rank. Although these symbols and gestures are nominally secret, they are readily found in public sources, including those published by Masonic organizations themselves.

Another ceremony is the annual installation of the master of the lodge and his appointed or elected officers. In some jurisdictions, an Installed Master elected, obligated, and invested to preside over a lodge, is valued as a separate rank with its own secrets and distinctive title and attributes; after each full year in the chair the Master invests his elected successor and becomes a past master with privileges in the lodge and grand lodge. In other jurisdictions, the grade is not recognised, and no inner ceremony conveys new secrets during the installation of a new master of the lodge.

Most lodges have some sort of social functions, allowing members, their partners, and non-Masonic guests to meet openly. Often coupled with these events is the discharge of every Mason's and lodge's collective obligation to contribute to charity. This occurs at many levels, including in annual dues, subscriptions, fundraising events, lodges and grand lodges. Masons and their charities contribute for the relief of need in many fields, such as education, health and old age.

Private lodges form the backbone of Freemasonry, with the sole right to elect their own candidates for initiation as Masons or admission as joining Masons, and sometimes with exclusive rights over residents local to their premises. There are non-local Lodges where Masons meet for wider or narrower purposes, such or in association with some hobby, sport, Masonic research, business, profession, regiment or college. The rank of Master Mason also entitles a Freemason to explore Masonry further through other degrees, administered separately from the basic Craft or "Blue Lodge" degrees described here, but generally having a similar structure and meetings.

There is much diversity and little consistency in Freemasonry because each Masonic jurisdiction is independent and sets its own rules and procedures while Grand Lodges have limited jurisdiction over their constituent member lodges, which are ultimately private clubs. The wording of the ritual, the number of officers present, the layout of the meeting room, etc. varies from jurisdiction to jurisdiction.

Almost all officers of a lodge are elected or appointed annually. Every Masonic Lodge has a master, two wardens, a treasurer and a secretary. There is also always a tyler, or outer guard, outside the door of a working lodge, who may be paid to secure its privacy. Other offices vary between jurisdictions.

Each Masonic lodge exists and operates according to its own by-laws and the rules and regulations of its own grand orient or grand lodge, which elude any universally accepted definition and vary depending on the jurisdiction.

== Organisation ==
=== Grand lodges ===
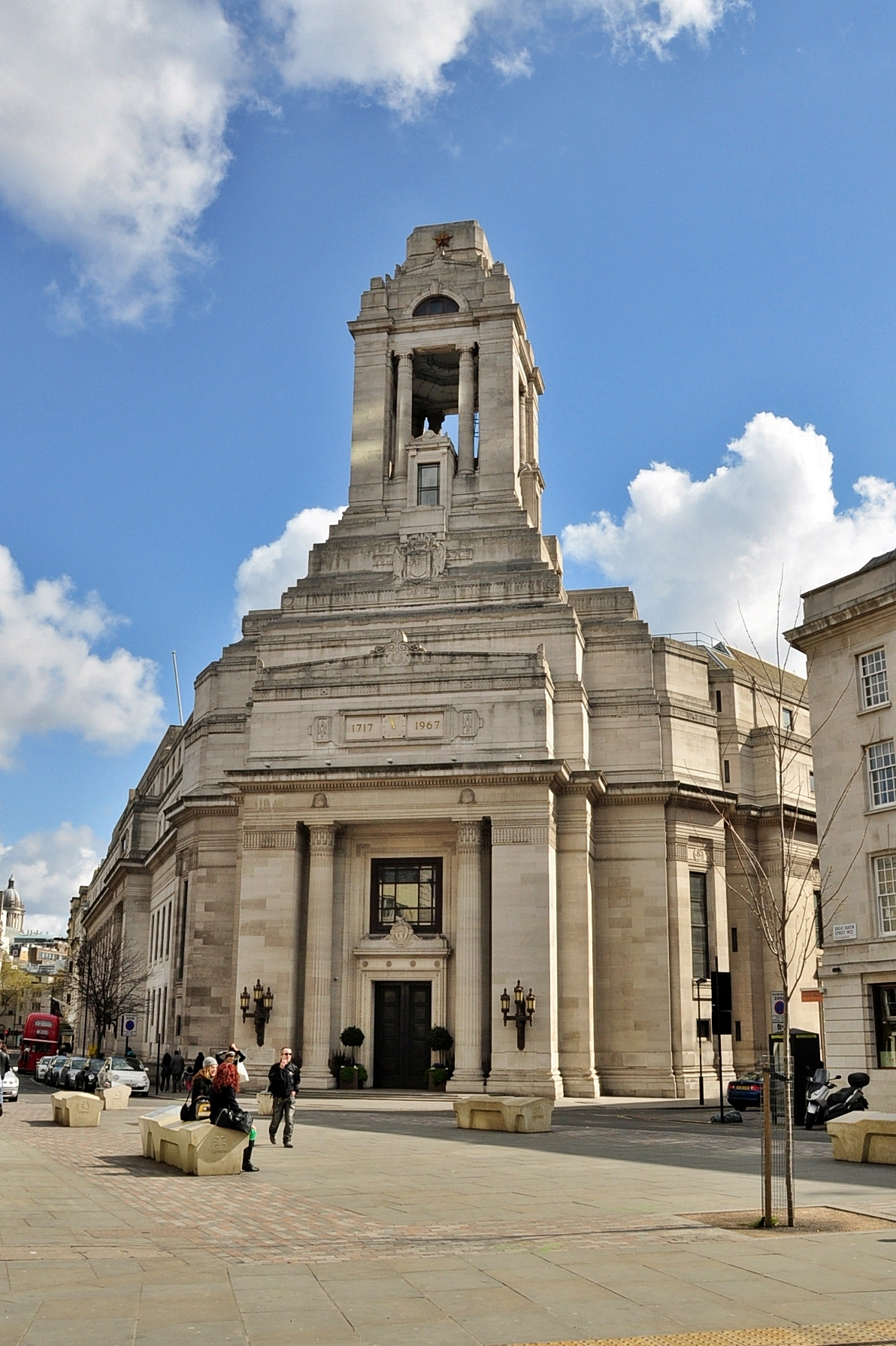
Freemasons Hall, London, home of the United Grand Lodge of England

Brighton Masonic Centre

Grand lodges and grand orients are independent and sovereign bodies that govern Masonry in a given country, state or geographical area (termed a jurisdiction). There is no single overarching governing body that presides over worldwide Freemasonry; connections between different jurisdictions depend solely on mutual recognition.

Estimates of the worldwide membership of Freemasonry in the early 21st century ranged from about two million to more than six million.

The fraternity is administratively organised into independent grand lodges (or sometimes grand orients), each of which governs its own Masonic jurisdiction, which consists of subordinate (or constituent) Lodges.

The largest single jurisdiction, in terms of membership, is the United Grand Lodge of England (with the organisation being split into provincial grand lodges and overseas districts which are located across the world, possessing a combined membership estimated at around 175,000). The Grand Lodge of Ireland claims it has approximately 19,000 members., and the Grand Lodge of Scotland has around 27,000 members.

In the United States, there is no national-level grand lodge. Instead, there are state-level grand lodges which are in amity with each other. The Masonic Service Association of North America has estimated that total membership is around 875,000.

The largest Regular body within France, Grande Loge Nationale Française, has grown within the last 10 years to approximately 32,000 members.. The largest in Germany, United Grand Lodges of Germany, which operate under an association of five regular grand lodges, claim to have over 15,000 members.

== Other degrees, orders and bodies ==
Blue lodges, known as craft lodges in the United Kingdom, operate on the three traditional degrees, which is the oldest foundational system and has been practiced for over 300 years in the UK. In most jurisdictions, the rank of past or installed master is also conferred in blue/craft lodges. Master Masons are able to extend their Masonic experience by taking further degrees, in concordant or other bodies whether or not approved by their own Grand Lodge.

The French Rite, historically also known as the Premier Rite or Modern Rite, is among the oldest surviving codified Masonic rites, originating from England. It developed in France from the ritual tradition transmitted from the Premier Grand Lodge of England, founded in London in 1717. The name "modern" derives from the rival Antient Grand Lodge of England, established in 1751, whose members called the original grand lodge the "moderns" and themselves the "antients". The French Rite dates from 1724 and was systematically organized during the 1780s as three symbolic grades followed by four higher orders, now commonly known as the Orders of Wisdom, forming a complete seven-stage progression.

The Ancient and Accepted Scottish Rite is a system of 33 degrees, including the three Blue Lodge degrees administered by a local or national supreme council. This system is popular in North America, South America and in Continental Europe. In America the York Rite, with a similar range, administers three orders of Masonry, namely the Royal Arch, Cryptic Masonry and Knights Templar.

In Britain separate bodies administer each order. Freemasons are encouraged to join the Holy Royal Arch, which is linked to Mark Masonry in Scotland and Ireland, but completely separate in England. In England the Royal Arch is closely associated with the Craft, automatically having many Grand Officers in common, including Prince Edward, Duke of Kent, as both Grand Master of the Craft and First Grand Principal of the Royal Arch. The English Knights Templar and Cryptic Masonry share the Mark Grand Lodge offices and staff at Mark Masons' Hall, London. The Ancient and Accepted Rite (similar to the Scottish Rite), requires a member to proclaim the Trinitarian Christian faith, and is administered from Duke Street in London. Conversely, the Societas Rosicruciana in Anglia is a fully independent esoteric organisation that requires members be United Grand Lodge of England Master Masons.

In the Nordic countries the Swedish Rite is dominant; a variation of it is also used in parts of Germany.

== Ritual and symbolism ==
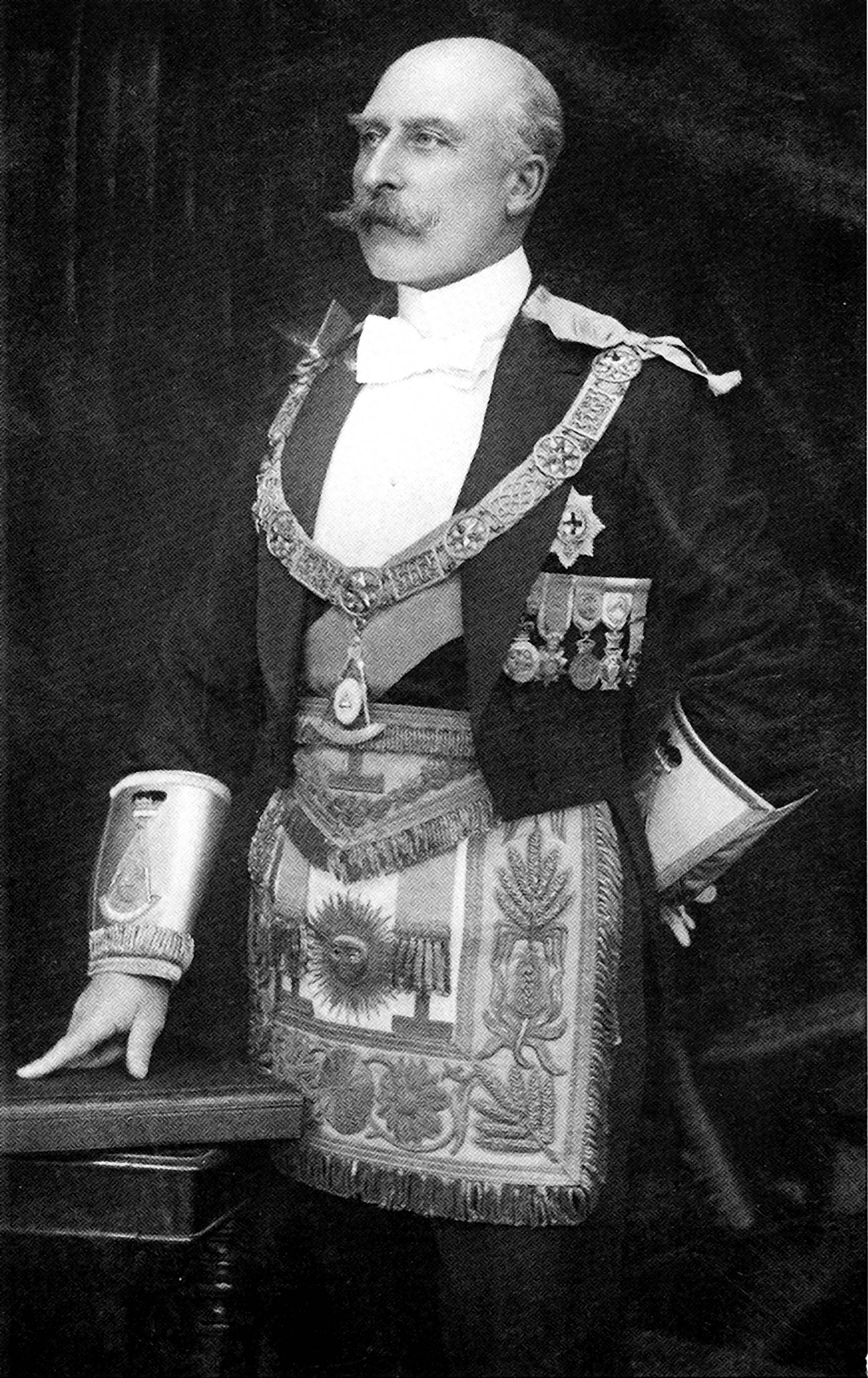
Duke Arthur of Connaught in full grand master's regalia.

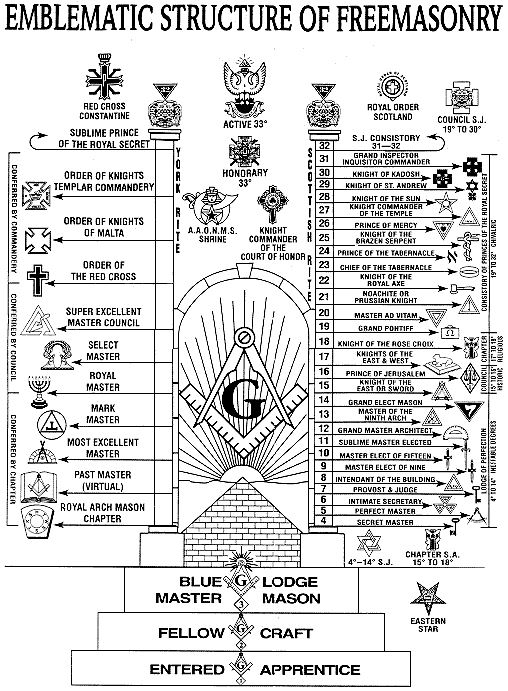
Freemasonry structure showing the symbols associated with the organisation

Freemasonry describes itself as a "beautiful system of morality, veiled in allegory and illustrated by symbols". The symbolism is mainly, but not exclusively, drawn from the tools of stonemasons—the square and compasses, the level and plumb rule, the trowel, the rough and smooth ashlars, among others. Moral lessons are attributed to each of these tools, although the assignment is by no means consistent. The meaning of symbolism is taught and explored through ritual, and in lectures and articles by individual Masons who offer their personal insights and opinions.

According to the scholar of Western esotericism Jan A. M. Snoek: "the best way to characterize Freemasonry is in terms of what it is not, rather than what it is". All Freemasons begin their journey in the "craft" by being progressively "initiated", "passed" and "raised" into the three degrees of Craft, or Blue Lodge Masonry. During these three rituals, the candidate is progressively taught the Masonic symbols, and is entrusted with grips or tokens, signs, and words to signify to other Masons which degrees he has taken. The dramatic allegorical ceremonies include explanatory lectures and revolve around the construction of the Temple of Solomon, and the artistry and death of the chief architect, Hiram Abiff. The degrees are those of "Entered apprentice", "Fellowcraft" and "Master Mason". While many different versions of these rituals exist, with various lodge layouts and versions of the Hiramic legend, each version is recognisable to any Freemason from any jurisdiction.

In some jurisdictions, the main themes of each degree are illustrated by tracing boards. These painted depictions of Masonic themes are exhibited in the lodge according to which degree is being worked on and are explained to the candidate to illustrate the legend and symbolism of each degree.

The idea of Masonic brotherhood probably descends from a 16th-century legal definition of a "brother" as one who has taken an oath of mutual support to another. Accordingly, Masons swear at each degree to support and protect their brethren. In most Lodges, the oath or obligation is taken on a Volume of Sacred Law, whichever book of divine revelation is appropriate to the religious beliefs of the individual brother (usually the Bible in the Anglo-American tradition). In Progressive continental Freemasonry, books other than scripture are permissible, a cause of rupture between Grand Lodges.

== History ==
=== Origins ===
Since the middle of the 19th century, Masonic historians have sought the origins of the movement in a series of similar documents known as the Old Charges, dating from the Regius Poem, the oldest known masonic text, written in middle english and originating from Shropshire, England in around 1425 to the beginning of the 18th century. Addressed to members of operative masons' lodges, they relate the craft to a mythologised history of the craft, the duties of its grades, and the manner in which oaths of fidelity are to be taken on joining. The 15th century also saw the first evidence of ceremonial regalia.

There is no clear mechanism by which these local trade organisations became today's Masonic lodges. The earliest rituals and passwords known, from operative lodges around the turn of the 17th–18th centuries, show continuity with the rituals developed in the later 18th century by accepted or speculative Masons, as those members who did not practice the physical craft gradually came to be known. The minutes of the Lodge of Edinburgh (Mary's Chapel) No. 1 in Scotland show a continuity from an operative lodge in 1598 to a modern speculative Lodge. It is reputed to be the oldest Masonic Lodge in the world.

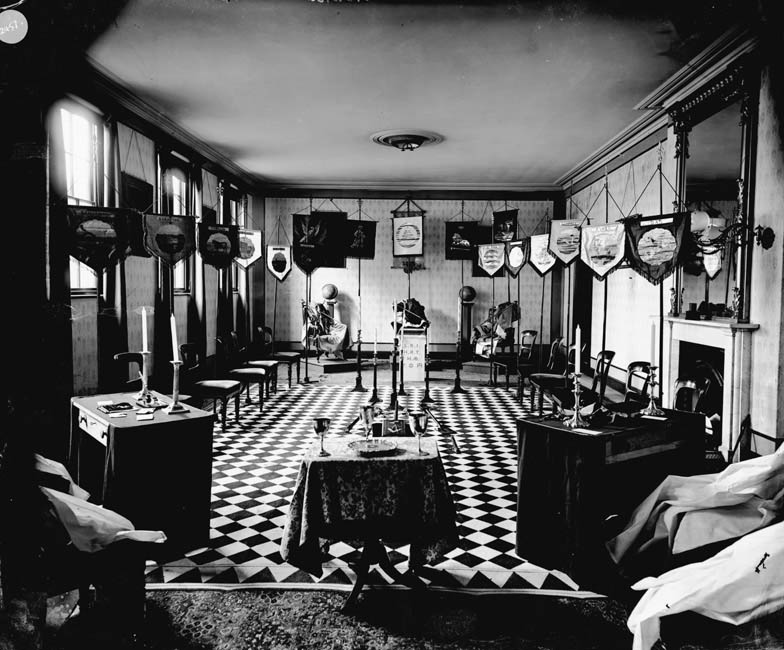
View of room at the Masonic Hall, Bury St Edmunds, Suffolk, England, early 20th century, set up for a Holy Royal Arch convocation

Alternatively, in 1803 German professor J. G. Buhle put forward the theory that Freemasonry may have been an outgrowth of Rosicrucianism, an idea taken up by Thomas De Quincey.

The first grand lodge, the Grand Lodge of London and Westminster, later called the Grand Lodge of England, was founded on St John's Day, 24 June 1717, when four existing London lodges met for a joint dinner. Over the next decade, most of the existing lodges in England joined the new regulatory body, which itself entered a period of self-publicity and expansion. New lodges were created, and the fraternity began to grow.

Over the course of the 18th century, as aristocrats and artists crowded out the craftsmen originally associated with the organisation, Freemasonry became fashionable throughout Europe and the American colonies.

Between 1730 and 1750, the grand lodge endorsed several significant changes that some lodges could not endorse. A rival grand lodge was formed on 17 July 1751, which called itself the "Antient Grand Lodge of England" to signify that, in their opinion, these lodges were maintaining older traditions and rejected changes that the Premiere Grand Lodge had adopted. As an insult, the self proclaimed "Antient Grand Lodge" coined the term "modern" to designate the Premiere Grand Lodge (historians now use Premiere Grand Lodge and Antient Grand Lodge to differentiate the two bodies). These two Grand Lodges vied for supremacy until the Premiere Grand Lodge made a compromise with the Antient Grand Lodge to return to a ritual that worked for both grand lodges. They re-united on 27 December 1813 to form the United Grand Lodge of England.

The Grand Lodge of Ireland and the Grand Lodge of Scotland were formed in 1725 and 1736, respectively, although neither persuaded all of the existing lodges in their countries to join for many years.

=== 18th-century Enlightenment ===
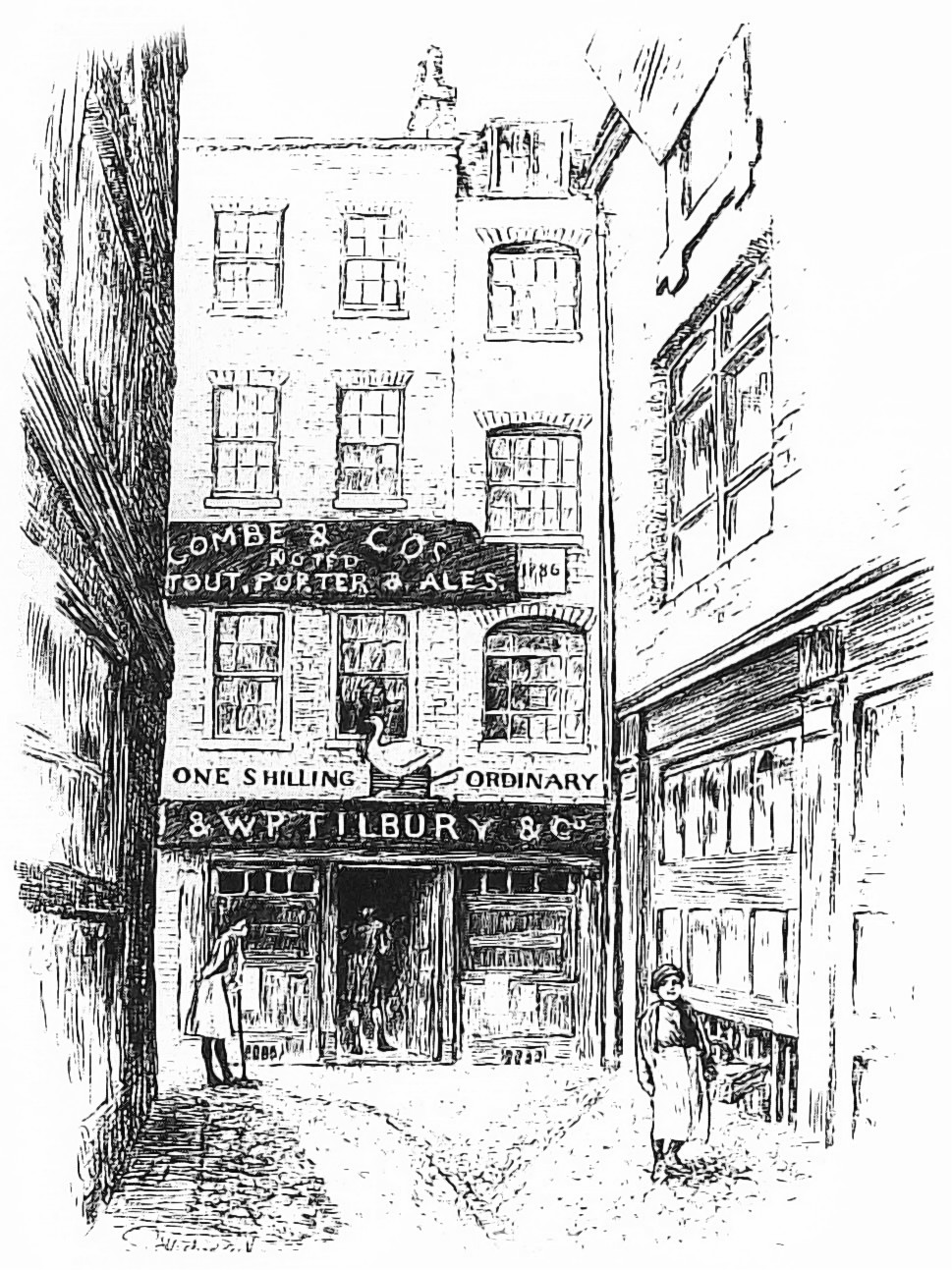
Goose and Gridiron, where the Grand Lodge of London and Westminster, later called the Grand Lodge of England, was founded

During the Age of the Enlightenment in the 18th century, Freemasons comprised an international network of like-minded men, often meeting in secret in ritualistic programs at their lodges. They promoted the ideals of the Enlightenment and helped diffuse these values across Britain and France and other places. British Freemasonry offered a systematic creed with its own myths, values and set of rituals. It fostered new codes of conduct—including a communal understanding of liberty and equality inherited from guild sociability—"liberty, fraternity, and equality." Scottish soldiers and Jacobite Scots brought to the Continent ideals of fraternity which reflected not the local system of Scottish customs but the institutions and ideals originating in the English Revolution against royal absolutism. Freemasonry was particularly prevalent in France—by 1789, there were between 50,000 and 100,000 French Masons, making Freemasonry the most popular of all Enlightenment associations.

Jacob argues that Masonic lodges probably had an effect on society as a whole, for they "reconstituted the polity and established a constitutional form of self-government, complete with constitutions and laws, elections and representatives". In other words, the micro-society set up within the lodges constituted a normative model for society as a whole. This was especially true on the Continent: when the first lodges began to appear in the 1730s, their embodiment of British values was often seen as threatening by state authorities. For example, the Parisian lodge that met in the mid-1720s was composed of English Jacobite exiles. Furthermore, freemasons all across Europe made reference to the Enlightenment in general in the 18th century. In French lodges, for example, the line "As the means to be enlightened I search for the enlightened" was a part of their initiation rites. British lodges assigned themselves the duty to "initiate the unenlightened". Many lodges praised the Grand Architect, the masonic terminology for the divine being who created a scientifically ordered universe.

On the other hand, the historian Robert Roswell Palmer noted that lodges operated separately and Masons politically did not act together as a group. American historians note that Benjamin Franklin and George Washington were leading Masons, but the significance of Freemasonry in the revolution is a topic of debate. Daniel Roche contests Freemasonry's claims for egalitarianism, writing that "the real equality of the lodges was elitist", only attracting men of similar social backgrounds.

In long-term historical perspective, Norman Davies has argued that Freemasonry was a powerful force in Europe from about 1700 to the twentieth century. It expanded rapidly during the Age of Enlightenment, reaching practically every country in Europe, as well as the European colonies in the New World and Asia. Davies states, "In the nineteenth century and beyond it would be strongly associated with the cause of Liberalism." In Catholic lands it was anti-clerical and came under heavy attack from the Catholic Church. In the 20th century, it was suppressed by Fascist and Communist regimes. It was especially attractive to royalty, aristocrats, politicians and businessmen, as well as intellectuals, artists and political activists. Davies notes that prominent members included Montesquieu, Voltaire, Sir Robert Walpole, Wolfgang Amadeus Mozart, Johann Wolfgang von Goethe, Benjamin Franklin and George Washington. Steven Bullock notes that in the late 18th century, English lodges were headed by the Prince of Wales, Prussian lodges by King Frederick the Great, and French lodges by royal princes. Napoleon as Emperor of the French selected his own brother as the Grand Master of France.

=== Emergence of Freemasonry in Europe ===
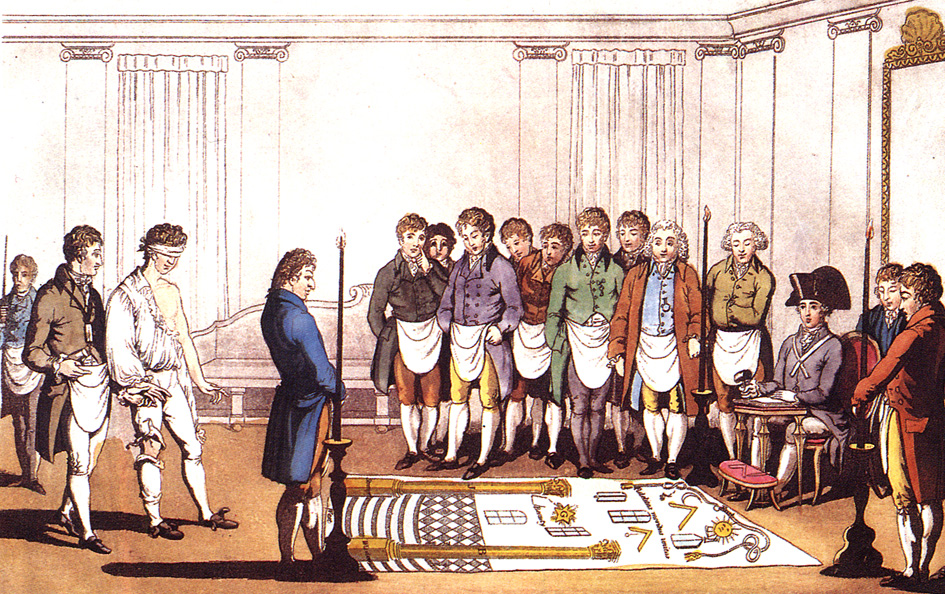
Masonic initiation, Paris, 1745

English Freemasonry spread to France in the 1720s, first as lodges of expatriates and exiled Jacobites, and then as distinctively French lodges that still follow the ritual of the Premier Grand Lodge of England. From France and England, Freemasonry spread to most of Continental Europe during the course of the 18th century. The Grande Loge de France was formed under the Grand Mastership of the Duke of Clermont, who exercised only nominal authority. His successor, Louis Philippe II, Duke of Orléans, reconstituted the central body as the Grand Orient de France in 1773. Briefly eclipsed during the French Revolution, French Freemasonry continued to grow in the next century, at first under the leadership of Alexandre Francois Auguste de Grasse, Comte de Grassy-Tilly.

=== France ===
In the 18th century, liberal French politicians met together in Masonic lodges to develop some of the Enlightenment ideas that dominated the French Revolution of 1789. Avner Halpern has traced French Freemasonry's major role in building France's first modern political party in 1901, the Radical Party. It used two Masonic devices: the "civil leadership model", which Freemasonry developed in late 19th century France, and the local Masonic congresses of the Grand Orient of France federations. In 1877, the Grand Orient de France abolished the requirement that its members believe in God and the immortality of the soul, hence breaking away from the core traditions of regular freemasonry. However, many members within France resisted this schism and as a response formed the Grande Loge Nationale Française was formed in 1913. This grand lodge continued alignment with the regular principals of freemasonry. It currently being the only grand lodge in France to be recognised by the majority of worldwide Regular Freemasonry and United Grand Lodge of England.

=== Russia ===
Freemasons had been active in Russia in the 18th century, working to introduce Enlightenment ideals; however, they were increasingly suppressed by the government. According to Ludwick Hass, Freemasonry was officially illegal in Tsarist Russia, but would later be introduced by exiles who returned after the 1905 revolution. These individuals had been active Masons in Paris, where lodges were politically active in the new Radical Party. In Russia, the Freemasons supported constitutional liberalism and maintained ties with France while simplifying many of the ceremonial rituals. Their secret meetings became a centre of progressive ideals, attracting politicians and activists. The lodges initially supported World War I, promoting close ties with France. The liberal activist Alexander Kerensky, who came to political power with the overthrow of the tsars in 1917, was a Mason. The organisation collapsed as the Bolsheviks took power and was again outlawed.

=== Italy ===
According to Adrian Lyttelton, in the early 20th century, Freemasonry was an influential but semi-secret force in Italian politics; with a strong presence among professionals and the middle class across Italy, its appeal spread to the leadership of the parliament, public administration, and the army. The two main organisations were the Grand Orient and the Grand Lodge of Italy. They had around 25,000 members in some 500 lodges. Politically, they promoted Italian nationalism, focused on unification, and undermining the power of the Catholic Church. The Catholic Church was a vigorous opponent of unification, and thus of the Freemasons; various national governments would repeatedly alternate and backpedal between the anticlerical side and the Church side. Freemasons took on the challenge of mobilising the press, encouraging public opinion and the leading political parties in support of Italy's joining of the Allies of the First World War in 1914–1915. In 1919 they favoured a League of Nations to promote a new post-war, universal order based upon the peaceful coexistence of independent and democratic nations. In the early 1920s, many of Mussolini's collaborators, especially the leaders in organising the March on Rome, were Masons. The lodges hailed fascism as the saviour of Italy from Bolshevism; however, Mussolini decided he needed to come to terms with the Catholic Church, in the mid-1920s, outlawing Freemasonry.

=== Germany ===
Freemasonry in Germany (German: Freimaurerei) started in several places during the second quarter of the Eighteenth century. After the extinction of the Rite of Strict Observance, which had a wide following and claimed Templar origins for its higher degrees, the several Grand Lodges in Germany defied all attempts at unification, although a largely ineffectual central organisation came into being with the unification of Germany. During the 1920s Freemasons were harassed alongside Jews by those taken in by the Protocols of the Elders of Zion, and blamed for the German surrender of 1918.

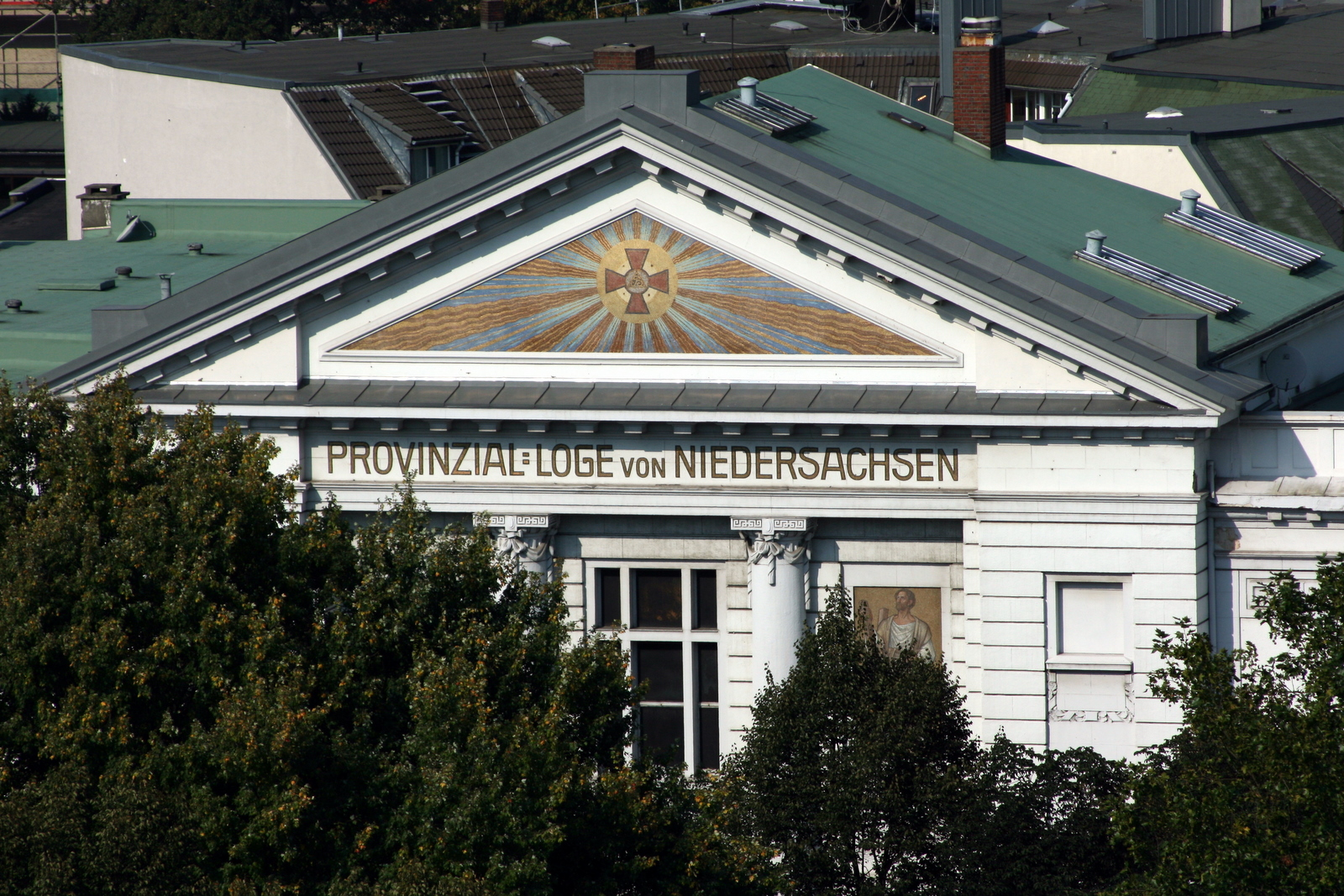
Provincial Lodge of Lower Saxony in Hamburg, Lodge House

This culminated with the suppression of Freemasonry by the Nazis in 1935, with many Masons in Germany and occupied countries being executed or sent to concentration camps. Freemasonry returned to Germany after World War Two. A single central body now represents five "regular" Grand Lodges United Grand Lodges of Germany. The oldest is the Grand National Mother Lodge ‘Zu den drei Weltkugeln’ (‘To the Three Globes’, GNML), founded in 1740.

=== North America ===
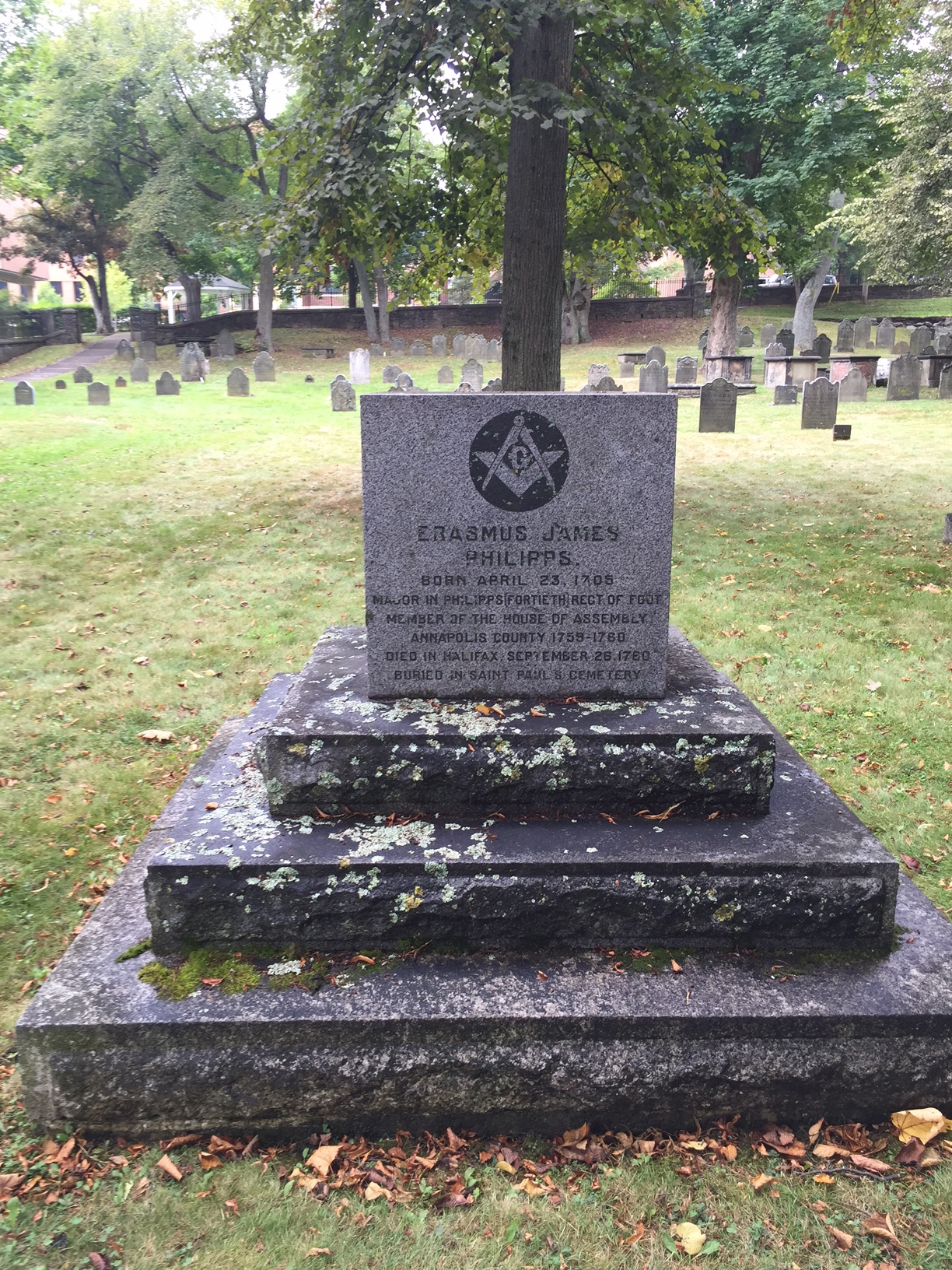
Monument to Erasmus James Philipps, first Freemason in present-day Canada, Old Burying Ground (Halifax, Nova Scotia)

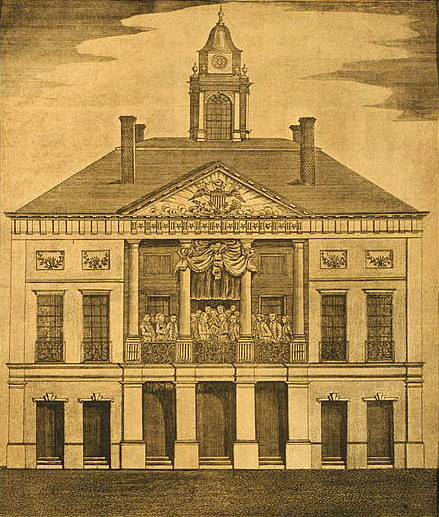
Federal Hall, New York City, site of George Washington's first inauguration, 30 April 1789.

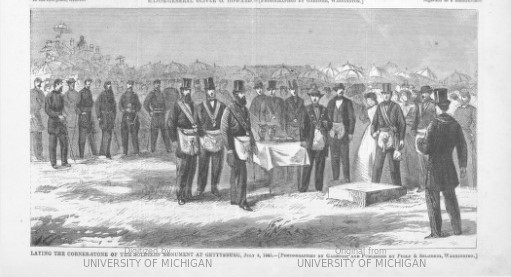
Masonic Conescecration of Solder Monument Gettysburg PA July 1865 (Made from Alexander Gardner Photograph Harper's Weekly 22 July 1865 p.453)

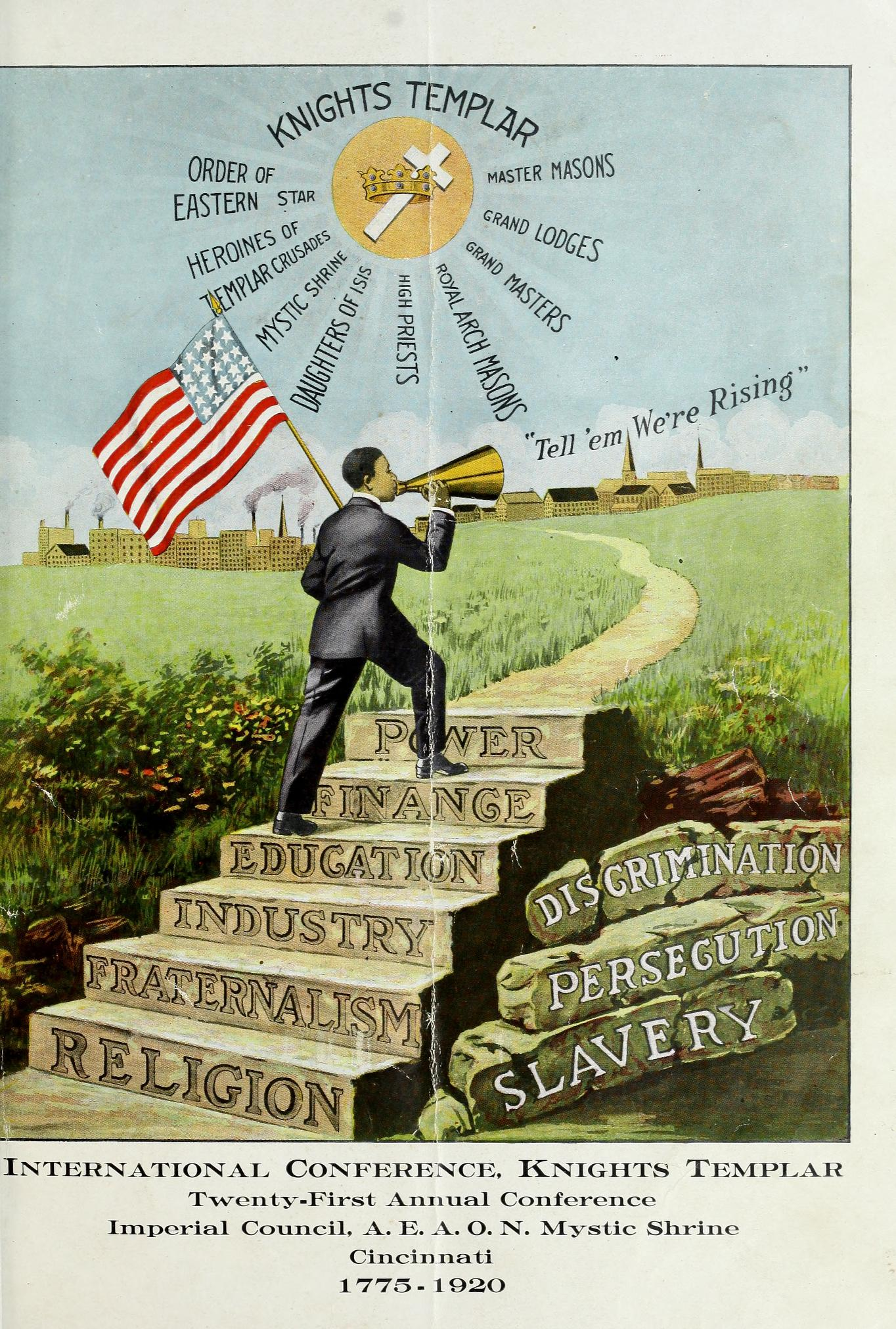
Illustration promoting African American ascent of the ladder of success, from a Prince Hall Masonic convention program book in 1920

The earliest known American lodges were in Pennsylvania. The collector for the port of Pennsylvania, John Moore, wrote of attending lodges there in 1715, two years before the putative formation of the first grand lodge in London. The Grand Lodge of England appointed a Provincial Grand Master for North America in 1731, based in Pennsylvania, leading to the creation of the Grand Lodge of Pennsylvania.

In Canada Erasmus James Philipps became a Freemason while working on a commission to resolve boundaries in New England and, in 1739 he became provincial grand master for Nova Scotia; Philipps founded the first Masonic lodge in Canada at Annapolis Royal, Nova Scotia.

Other lodges in the colony of Pennsylvania obtained authorisations from the later Antient Grand Lodge of England, the Grand Lodge of Scotland and the Grand Lodge of Ireland, which was particularly well represented in the travelling lodges of the British Army. Many lodges came into existence with no warrant from any Grand Lodge, applying and paying for their authorisation only after they were confident of their own survival.

After the American Revolution independent US grand lodges developed within each state. Some thought was briefly given to organising an overarching "Grand Lodge of the United States", with George Washington, who was a member of a Virginian lodge, as the first grand master, but the idea was short-lived. The various state Grand Lodges did not wish to diminish their own authority by agreeing to such a body.

On 30 April 1789, Washington took his oath of office at his first inauguration upon a Bible belonging to St. John's Lodge No. 1 of New York. Robert Livingston, Chancellor of the State of New York, also the first grand master of the Grand Lodge of Free and Accepted Masons of the State of New York, administered the oath.

==== Prince Hall Freemasonry ====
Prince Hall Freemasonry exists because of the refusal of early American lodges to admit African Americans. In 1775, an African American named Prince Hall, along with 14 other African American men, was initiated into a British military lodge with a warrant from the Grand Lodge of Ireland, having failed to obtain admission from the other lodges in Boston. When the British military Lodge left North America after the end of the Revolutionary War, those 15 men were given the authority to meet as a lodge, but not to initiate Masons. In 1784, these individuals obtained a Warrant from the Grand Lodge of England (Premiere Grand Lodge) and formed African Lodge, Number 459. When the two English grand lodges united in 1813, all U.S.-based Lodges were stricken from their rolls—largely because of the War of 1812. Thus, separated from both English jurisdiction and any concordantly recognised U.S. grand lodge, African Lodge retitled itself as the African Lodge, Number 1—and became a de facto grand lodge. (This lodge is not to be confused with the various grand lodges in Africa.) As with the rest of US Freemasonry, Prince Hall Freemasonry soon grew and organised on a Grand Lodge system for each state.

Unlike other fraternal orders, there was never any blanket rule against the admission of men based on their race. Each lodge and grand lodge had their own rules, both written and unwritten. A few non–Prince Hall lodges did admit Blacks, with Angelo Soliman being one notable Masonic personality of African descent. Nonetheless, widespread racial segregation in 19th- and early-20th-century North America made it difficult for African Americans to join Lodges outside of Prince Hall jurisdictions.

Today most (but not all) US grand lodges recognise their Prince Hall counterparts, and the authorities of both traditions are working towards full recognition. The United Grand Lodge of England has no problem with recognising Prince Hall grand lodges. While celebrating their heritage as lodges of African Americans, Prince Hall is open to all men regardless of race or religion.

=== Latin America and Caribbean ===
==== Jamaican Freemasonry ====
Freemasonry was imported to Jamaica by British settlers. In 1908 there were eleven recorded Masonic lodges, which included three Grand Lodges, two Craft lodges, and two Rose Croix chapters. During slavery, the lodges were open to all "freeborn" men. After the full abolition of slavery in 1838, the Lodges were open to all Jamaican men of any race. Jamaica also kept close relationships with Masons from other countries. Jamaican Freemasonry historian Jackie Ranston noted that:

Jamaica served as an arms depot for the revolutionary forces when two Kingston Freemasons, Wellwood and Maxwell Hyslop, financed the campaigns of Simón Bolívar, the Liberator, to whom six Latin American Republics owe their independence". Bolívar himself was a Mason, enjoying contacts with Brethren in Spain, England, France, and Venezuela until after gaining power in Venezuela, he prohibited all secret societies in 1828 and included the Freemasons.

The Spanish government outlawed Freemasonry in its overseas empire in the mid-18th century, and energetically enforced the ban. Nevertheless, many Freemasons were active in planning and plotting for independence. Leaders with Freemason membership included Simón Bolívar, Grand Master Francisco de Miranda, José de San Martin, Bernardo O'Higgins and many others. The movement was important after independence was achieved in the 1820s. In Brazil many prominent men were Freemasons, and they played a leading role in the abolition of slavery.

==== Mexico ====
Freemasons were leaders in liberalism and anticlericalism in 19th- and 20th-century Mexico. Members included numerous top leaders. The Freemasons were divided regarding relations with the United States, with a pro-U.S. faction supported by the American ambassador Joel Poinsett known as the "Yorkinos". According to the historian Karen Racine, Freemasons in the presidency of Mexico included: Guadalupe Victoria, Valentín Gómez Farías, Antonio López de Santa Anna, Benito Juárez, Sebastián Lerdo de Tejada, Porfirio Díaz, Francisco I. Madero, Venustiano Carranza, Plutarco Elías Calles, Lázaro Cárdenas, Emilio Portes Gil, Pascual Ortiz Rubio, Abelardo L. Rodríguez and Miguel Alemán Valdés.

=== Freemasonry in the Middle East ===
After the failure of the 1830 Italian revolution, a number of Italian Freemasons were forced to flee. They secretly set up an approved chapter of Scottish Rite in Alexandria, a town already inhabited by a large Italian community. Meanwhile, the French Freemasons publicly organised a local chapter in Alexandria in 1845. During the 19th and 20th century, Masonic lodges operated widely across all parts of the Ottoman Empire and numerous Sufi orders shared a close relationship with them. Many Young Turks affiliated with the Bektashi Order were members and patrons of Freemasonry. They were also closely allied against European imperialism. Many Ottoman intellectuals believed that Sufism and Freemasonry shared close similarities in doctrines, spiritual outlook and mysticism.

=== Asia-Pacific ===
==== China ====
The first lodge formed in China was the Amity Lodge which constituted at Canton in 1767. In 1875, District Grand Lodge of China split into two Districts, Northern China, and Hong Kong and South China. During the second world war, all Masonic activity in Hong Kong was brought to a halt due to the Japanese invasion. After 1949, when the new Chinese government (Communist) was established, some lodges moved to Hong Kong or closed due to a lack of new candidates. Freemasonry is currently outlawed by the Chinese Communist Party in mainland China. It is permitted in Hong Kong. Freemasonry survived on the island of Taiwan and the Grand Lodge of China is based in Taipei. Royal Sussex Lodge No. 501 was the first lodge established in Victoria City of Hong Kong on 29 April 1844. There are 20 (English Constitution) lodges under the District Grand Lodge of Hong Kong and Far East, United Grand Lodge of England that meet at Zetland Hall.

=== Schisms ===
The year 1877 marked a schism of freemasonry within France. The Grand Orient of France decided to remove from its constitution the traditional obligations and requirement of belief in a supreme being and displaying the volume of sacred law during lodge meetings. This evolution did not merely involve constitutional changes, but also the involvement in the political landscape, something regular freemasonry forbade participation and discussion about to maintain harmony within the lodge. Some members fully embraced this direction.

A dispute during the Lausanne Congress of Supreme Councils of 1875 prompted the Grand Orient de France to commission a report by a Protestant pastor, which concluded that, as Freemasonry was not a religion, it should not require a religious belief. The new constitutions read, "Its principles are absolute liberty of conscience and human solidarity", the existence of God and the immortality of the soul being struck out. However, some members considered the explicit reference to the Grand Architect of the Universe and the presence of the volume of the Sacred Law constituted structural elements of masonic tradition.

Not all French lodges agreed with the new wording. In 1894, lodges favouring the compulsory recognition of the Great Architect of the Universe formed the Grande Loge de France. In 1913, the United Grand Lodge of England recognised a new Grand Lodge of Regular Freemasons, a Grand Lodge that follows the traditional tenants of Freemasonry with a mandatory belief in a deity.

There are now three strands of Freemasonry in France: –

- Regular or Conservative – Standard Anglo-American ritual, mandatory belief in Supreme Being and following the traditional practices of Freemasonry.
- Liberal, also called adogmatic or progressive – Principles of liberty of conscience, and laicity, particularly the separation of the Church and State.
- Traditional – Old French ritual with a requirement for a belief in a Supreme Being. (This strand is typified by the Grande Loge de France).

The term Continental Freemasonry was used in Mackey's 1873 Encyclopedia of Freemasonry to "designate the Lodges on the Continent of Europe which retain many usages which have either been abandoned by, or never were observed in, the Lodges of England, Ireland, and Scotland, as well as the United States of America". However, some consider this term misleading due to the majority of continental European freemasonry still being under Regular Freemasonry. Today, it is frequently used to refer to only the Liberal jurisdictions typified by the Grand Orient de France.

The majority of worldwide Freemasonry considers the Liberal (Continental) strand to be Irregular, and thus withhold recognition. The Continental lodges, however, did not want to sever masonic ties. In 1961, a small umbrella organisation, Centre de Liaison et d'Information des Puissances maçonniques Signataires de l'Appel de Strasbourg (CLIPSAS) was set up, which provides a forum for the small amount of Grand Lodges and Grand Orients who have schism from mainstream freemasonry. Included in the list of over 70 smaller Grand Lodges and Grand Orients are representatives of all three of the above categories, including mixed and women's organisations. The majority of organised freemasonry (Regular Freemasonry) withholds any form of communication with irregular grand lodges, as they are not considered part of the worldwide body. This creates the distinction between Regular Freemasonry and Continental Freemasonry.

=== Freemasonry and women ===
The status of women in the old guilds and corporations of medieval masons remains uncertain. The principle of "femme sole" allowed a widow to continue the trade of her husband, but its application had wide local variations, such as full membership of a trade body or limited trade by deputation or approved members of that body. In Masonry, the small available evidence points to the less empowered end of the scale.

At the dawn of the Grand Lodge era, during the 1720s, James Anderson composed the first printed constitutions for Freemasons, the basis for most subsequent constitutions, which specifically excluded women from Freemasonry. As Freemasonry spread, women began to be added to the Lodges of Adoption by their husbands who were continental masons, which worked three degrees with the same names as the men's but different content. The French officially abandoned the experiment in the early 19th century. Later organisations with a similar aim emerged in the United States but distinguished the names of the degrees from those of male masonry.

Maria Deraismes was initiated into Freemasonry in 1882, then resigned to allow her lodge to rejoin their Grand Lodge. Having failed to achieve acceptance from any masonic governing body, she and Georges Martin started a mixed masonic lodge that worked masonic ritual. Annie Besant spread the phenomenon to the English-speaking world. Disagreements over ritual led to the formation of exclusively female bodies of Freemasons in England, which spread to other countries. Meanwhile, the French had re-invented Adoption as an all-female lodge in 1901, only to cast it aside again in 1935. The lodges, however, continued to meet, which gave rise, in 1959, to a body of women practising continental Freemasonry.

In general, Continental Freemasonry is sympathetic to Freemasonry among women, dating from the 1890s when French lodges assisted the emergent co-masonic movement by promoting enough of their members to the 33rd degree of the Ancient and Accepted Scottish Rite to allow them, in 1899, to form their own grand council, recognised by the other Continental Grand Councils of that Rite. The United Grand Lodge of England issued a statement in 1999 recognising the two women's grand lodges there, The Order of Women Freemasons and The Honourable Fraternity of Ancient Freemasons, to be regular in all but the participants. While they were not, therefore, recognised as regular, they were part of Freemasonry "in general". The attitude of most regular Anglo-American grand lodges remains that women Freemasons are not legitimate Masons.

In 2018 guidance was released by the United Grand Lodge of England stating that, in regard to transgender women, "A Freemason who after initiation ceases to be a man does not cease to be a Freemason". The guidance also states that transgender men are allowed to apply.

== Anti-Masonry ==
Anti-Masonry, or anti-Free-Masonry, encompasses religious, political and conspiratorial opposition to Free-Masonry. It has never constituted a single coherent movement: opponents have included religious institutions, political organisations, governments and writers alleging that Freemasons exercise secret influence over society.

The Catholic Church has prohibited Catholics from joining Masonic organisations since the promulgation of In eminenti apostolatus by Pope Clement XII in 1738. Pope Clement XII declared in a Papal Bull that anyone joining the Freemasons would be excommunicated. The prohibition remains intact to the present day. The prohibition arose within the political and confessional circumstances surrounding the early spread of Freemasonry from the British Isles into Catholic Europe. One area of concern of the Church was the secret rituals of Freemasons. In France and Italy, early Masonic networks included both Catholic Jacobite exiles supporting the deposed House of Stuart and Protestants associated with the Hanoverian political order. Historians have consequently connected the first condemnation in part with contemporary concerns about foreign influence, secret political association and Jacobite–Hanoverian rivalry.

The Second Vatican Council did not discuss Free-Masonry directly or revoke the prohibition, but its broader emphasis on religious liberty and dialogue was followed by a period of reassessment and formal and informal contacts between Catholics and Free-Masonry in several countries. In 1974, the Congregation for the Doctrine of the Faith sent a private letter to several episcopal conferences concerning the interpretation of Canon 2335 of the 1917 Code of Canon Law. After the letter became public, it was interpreted by some as permitting Catholics to join Masonic organisations that did not actively plot against the Church. In 1981, however, the Congregation stated that the letter had produced erroneous interpretations and that the existing canonical discipline and penalties had not been modified or abrogated.

Further uncertainty arose when the 1983 Code of Canon Law no longer mentioned Masonic associations by name. The Congregation consequently issued its Declaration on Masonic Associations, stating that the omission resulted from the code's use of broader categories and did not indicate a change in the Church's position. It declared that membership remained forbidden and that Catholics enrolled in Masonic associations were in a state of grave sin and could not receive Holy Communion. The Dicastery for the Doctrine of the Faith reaffirmed this position in 2023, citing what it described as the irreconcilability between Catholic doctrine and Freemasonry.

Some Eastern Orthodox and Protestant churches have also prohibited or discouraged Masonic membership, although Protestant attitudes have historically ranged from strong opposition to close social and institutional association with Free-Masonry. Attitudes in Muslim societies have likewise differed: Free-Masonry attracted Muslim intellectuals and political figures in several countries, while its opponents associated it with European influence, secularism, Zionism or religious and political conspiracy theories.

Political anti-Masonry became especially influential in the United States following the 1826 disappearance of William Morgan, who had intended to publish an exposure of Masonic rituals. Public suspicion surrounding the affair contributed to the formation of the Anti-Masonic Party, the first significant third party in American national politics.

During the twentieth century, Free-Masonry was suppressed by several authoritarian governments. Nazi Germany dissolved Masonic organisations, confiscated their property and persecuted Freemasons regarded as political or ideological opponents. Nazi propaganda also presented Free-Masonry as part of an alleged international Jewish conspiracy. The Francoist regime in Spain similarly criminalised Free-Masonry and subjected suspected members to systematic investigation, imprisonment and other forms of punishment.

Free-Masonry has also been a recurrent subject of conspiracy theories alleging secret control of governments, revolutions or international institutions. From the nineteenth century onward, some of these narratives merged with antisemitism to form the Judeo-Masonic conspiracy theory, which was later incorporated into Nazi and other far-right propaganda.

== See also ==
- Ahiman Rezon
- Adonhiramite Rite
- Carbonari
- Chamber of Reflection
- Deism (relation to Freemasonry)
- Elias Ashmole
- Emulation Lodge of Improvement
- Freemasonry during World War I
- Freemasonry during World War II
- Freemasonry in Asia
- Freemasonry in Belgium
- Freemasonry in Cuba
- Freemasonry in Spain
- Freemasonry in the French Third Republic
- French Rite
- George Washington Masonic National Memorial
- Gormogons
- Grand College of Rites
- High Masonic degrees
- House of the Temple
- Job's Daughters International
- John Theophilus Desaguliers
- Joseph de Maistre
- Knight Kadosh
- La Chaîne d'Union
- Larmenius Charter
- List of general fraternities
- List of Masonic buildings
- List of Masonic Grand Lodges
- Les Neuf Sœurs
- Masonic music
- National Mexican Rite
- National Sojourners
- Observant Freemasonry
- Order of the Amaranth
- Philalethes
- Philosophical Scottish Rite
- Primitive Scottish Rite
- Rainbow for Girls
- Rite Opératif de Salomon
- Rite of Memphis-Misraim
- Rite of Strict Observance
- Royal Order of Scotland
- Schröder Rite
- Shriners Hospitals for Children
- Suppression of Freemasonry
- Swedenborgian Rite
- Thomas Dunckerley
