= René Guilly =

French art historian and journalist

René Guilly (pseudonym René Désaguliers), born 27 July 1921 in Paris and died 11 June 1992, was a French journalist, art historian, art critic, museum curator, Freemason, Masonologist and Martinist.

== Biography ==
Coming from a family of the republican bourgeoisie (his father is a doctor and a free-thinker), he was first marked by the work and ideas of Jean Giono and he studied literature. He frequented the artistic circles of post-war Paris and began at Combat in the pages of "Parisian life" and "art criticism". In particular, he published a memorable interview with Salvador Dalí and important discussions with Antonin Artaud. After a first career in journalism, he devoted himself to the history of art and became assistant to Germain Bazin at the Louvre museum. His professional life then unfolds as chief curator of the museums of france, head of the restoration service of classified and controlled museums, full professor at the École du Louvre.

== Martinism ==
René Guilly was initiated into Martinism in 1961, with the order name of Sâr Athanasius Indagator, by Pierre Mariel. He got closer to Louis Bentin, Grand Master of the Martinist and Synarchic Order, from whom he received on 12 April 1975 a founding charter from the Parisian lodge Scala Jacobi, which operated until 1977 and subsequently became an independent group, to finally join the Martinist Tradition, working on the basis of the Martinist ritual of Papus.

== Bibliography ==
He is the author of a large number of articles, most of them published in his traditional Renaissance magazine, some of which have been collected in three posthumous works:

- Les Pierres de la Franc-maçonnerie, de la première pierre à la pierre triomphale (texts collected and adapted by Roger Dachez), Dervy, Paris, 1995.
- Les Deux Grandes Colonnes de la Franc-maçonnerie (new edition revised by Roger Dachez and Pierre Mollier), Dervy, Paris, 1997 (reissue, 2011).
- Les Trois Grands Piliers de la franc-maçonnerie. Colonnes et chandeliers dans la tradition maçonnique (new edition revised by Roger Dachez), Véga, Paris, 2011.
