= Adonhiramite Rite =

Historical occultism

The Adonhiramite Rite is a Masonic system consisting of 33 grades or degrees. The founding of the Adonhiramite Rite is traditionally attributed to Louis Guillerman Saint-Victor, a French Freemason who, in 1781, published the first significant work on the rite, entitled "Recueil Précieux de la Maçonnerie Adonhiramite" (Precious Compilation of Adonhiramite Freemasonry). This rite combines Templar, Rosicrucian and other esoteric influences into a unique Masonic structure.

== History ==
The work of Louis Guillemain de Saint Victor had an extremely positive impact to the point that in 1785 (that is, just 3 years after the release of the first part and in the same year as the release of the second), it was already being published, in French, even in Philadelphia, USA. This work became a canonical reference of the Adonhiramite Rite, and with it the rite itself achieved wide dissemination and expansion in Europe, becoming the main rite of the Grande Oriente Lusitano and being exported to its colonies in Africa, Asia and the New World, including Brazil. In France, it became, together with the structure proposed by the General Grand Chapter, the standard of “Masonic Orthodoxy”. In fact, it is under the title of “Masonic Orthodoxy” (“Orthodoxie Maçonnique suive de La Maçonnerie Oculte”, published in 1837), that Jean Baptiste Marie Ragon (1781-1862) will make two gross errors that will spread with great success. Ragon's first error is the attribution of the “Precious Compilation of Adonhiramite Freemasonry” to Baron de Tschoudy (Théodore Henry de Tschoudy). This error will be repeated “ad nauseam” in Portugal and Brazil. Tschoudy had absolutely nothing to do with the Adonhiramite Rite. His work, “The Flaming Star” laid the foundations of an Order called the ‘Order of the Flaming Star’, with alchemical characteristics. In 1766, Tschoudy established, more on paper than in effect, his Order, based on the legend that alchemical traditions had been passed on by the ascetics of the ancient Thebaid to the Christian Orders of Chivalry and from there to Freemasonry. Tschoudy died in 1769, that is, 13 years before the release of the first part of the “Precious Compilation of Adonhiramite Freemasonry”. Ragon confused things and attributed the authorship of the “Precious Compilation of Adonhiramite Freemasonry” to the Baron. Ragon's second error was the statement that the Adonhiramite Rite consisted of 13 Degrees, since, for Ragon, the Degree of Noachite would be the 13th Degree.

== The Great Schism of 1973 ==
In 1973, the great “turnaround” occurred in the Adonhiramite Rite. This year, thirteen Great State Orients left the Central Power of the GOB. This, for the GOB, means the loss of most of its Lodges practicing the Adonhiramite Rite and an internal split within the “Very Powerful and Sublime Grand Chapter of the Noachite Knights for Brazil”, which could only admit Brothers linked to the GOB. To recover the Adonhiramite Rite within the GOB and within the “Very Powerful and Sublime Grand Chapter of the Noachite Knights for Brazil”, it is necessary to attract Brothers from other rites to it. How to do this? This was the question posed by the remaining Adonhiramite Brothers. In 1973, under the command of Brother Aylton Menezes, the “Very Powerful and Sublime Grand Chapter of the Noachite Knights for Brazil” changes its name to “Excelsior Council of Adonhiramite Freemasonry” (ECMA). What still remained was the complete reformulation of the Rite so that it would become more attractive to a Masonic population that was mostly from the REAA, that is, accustomed to a system of 33 Degrees and that would not feel attracted to a rite with only 13 (12 in fact).

== Organization and Grades ==
- The first three degrees are blue Lodge degrees:
  - Apprentice
  - Fellowcraft
  - Master Mason
- Current structure of High Degrees (or Philosophical Degrees):
  - SECOND CLASS
  - Grade 4 – Secret Master
  - Grade 5 – Perfect Master
  - Grade 6 – Provost and Judge
  - Grade 7 – First Elected or Elected of the Nine
  - Grade 8 – Second Elect or Elect Pérignan
  - Grade 9 – Third Elected or Elected of the Fifteen
  - Grade 10 – Scottish Apprentice or small Architect
  - Grade 11 – Scottish Fellow or Grand Master Architect
  - Grade 12 – Scottish Master or Grand Master Architect
  - Grade 13 – Knight of the Royal Arch
  - Grade 14 – Great Elect or Perfect and Sublime Freemason
  - THIRD CLASS
  - Degree 15 – Knight of the East, Sword or Eagle
  - Grade 16 – Prince of Jerusalem
  - Grade 17 – Knight of East and West
  - Degree 18 – Rosicrucian Knight
  - FOURTH CLASS
  - Degree 19 – Great Scottish Pontiff or Sublime
  - Degree 20 – Venerable Master of Regular Lodges or Master Ad Vitam
  - Degree 21 – Noachite Knight or Prussian Knight
  - FIFTH CLASS
  - Degree 22 – Knight of the Royal Machado or Prince of Lebanon
  - Degree 23 – Head of the Tabernacle
  - Degree 24 – Prince of the Tabernacle
  - Grade 25 – Bronze Serpent Knight
  - Degree 26 – Prince of Mercy or Trinitarian Scot
  - Degree 27 – Grand Commander of the Temple
  - Degree 28 – Sun Knight or Adept Prince
  - Degree 29 – Knight of Saint Andrew
  - Grade 30 – Kadosh Knight
  - SIXTH CLASS
  - Degree 31 – Sublime Initiate and Grand Preceptor
  - Degree 32 – Corregidor Prelate and General Ombudsman
  - SEVENTH CLASS
  - Degree 33 – Patriarch Inspector General

Each grade has an extensive ritual including grips, signs, regalia, and esoteric symbolism that builds on the Temple builder legend and Masonic philosophy.

== Ritual and Symbolism ==
The Adonhiramite Rite makes use of Masonic implements, allegorical journeys, and dramatic reenactments of legends to teach virtues and philosophical lessons. It draws on Biblical references and Hebrew mystical language. The central allegory focuses on finding the body of Hiram and the secret word to revive him.

Symbols and motifs include triangles, coffins, acacia, skulls, daggers, tears, and Solomon's Temple. These embody concepts like fidelity, mortality, ethics, universality, and man's relation with God. The rite integrates New Testament symbolism around Jesus, betrayal, and salvation into the Solomonic drama.

== Influence in the World ==
The Adonhiramite Rite helped spread the high-degree systems of Masonry from France, Germany and Scandinavia across Europe and Latin America in the late 1800s. It was one of the main vehicles popularizing additional grades beyond Master Mason at the time. The rite also transmitted occult and pseudo-Templar concepts into Masonry and later para-Masonic orders.

Though no longer widely practiced, the Adonhiramite Rite was an influential product of European occultism and an important influence on the development of continental Freemasonry.

Today the Adonhiram Rite is still practiced in Brazil, Portugal, Uruguay and France.

== Influence of the Adonhiramite Rite on the Scottish Rite ==
The branch of Freemasonry known as the Ancient and Accepted Scottish Rite is often mistakenly believed to have its origins in Scotland due to its name. However, historical research indicates that the Scottish Rite did not originate in Scotland but rather in Paris, France, around the year 1758.

Historical evidence suggests that the early predecessors of the Scottish Rite included various Masonic degrees and rites that existed in Europe. One of these significant influences was the Adonhiramite Rite, which emerged around 1781. The Adonhiramite Rite included many degrees that would later become integral components of the Scottish Rite.

The Adonhiramite Rite, with its diverse set of degrees and rituals, laid the foundation for the development of the Scottish Rite. It introduced several elements that would play a crucial role in the formation of the Scottish Rite as it is known today.

== See also ==
- List of Masonic rites
