= Arthur Groussier =

French politician

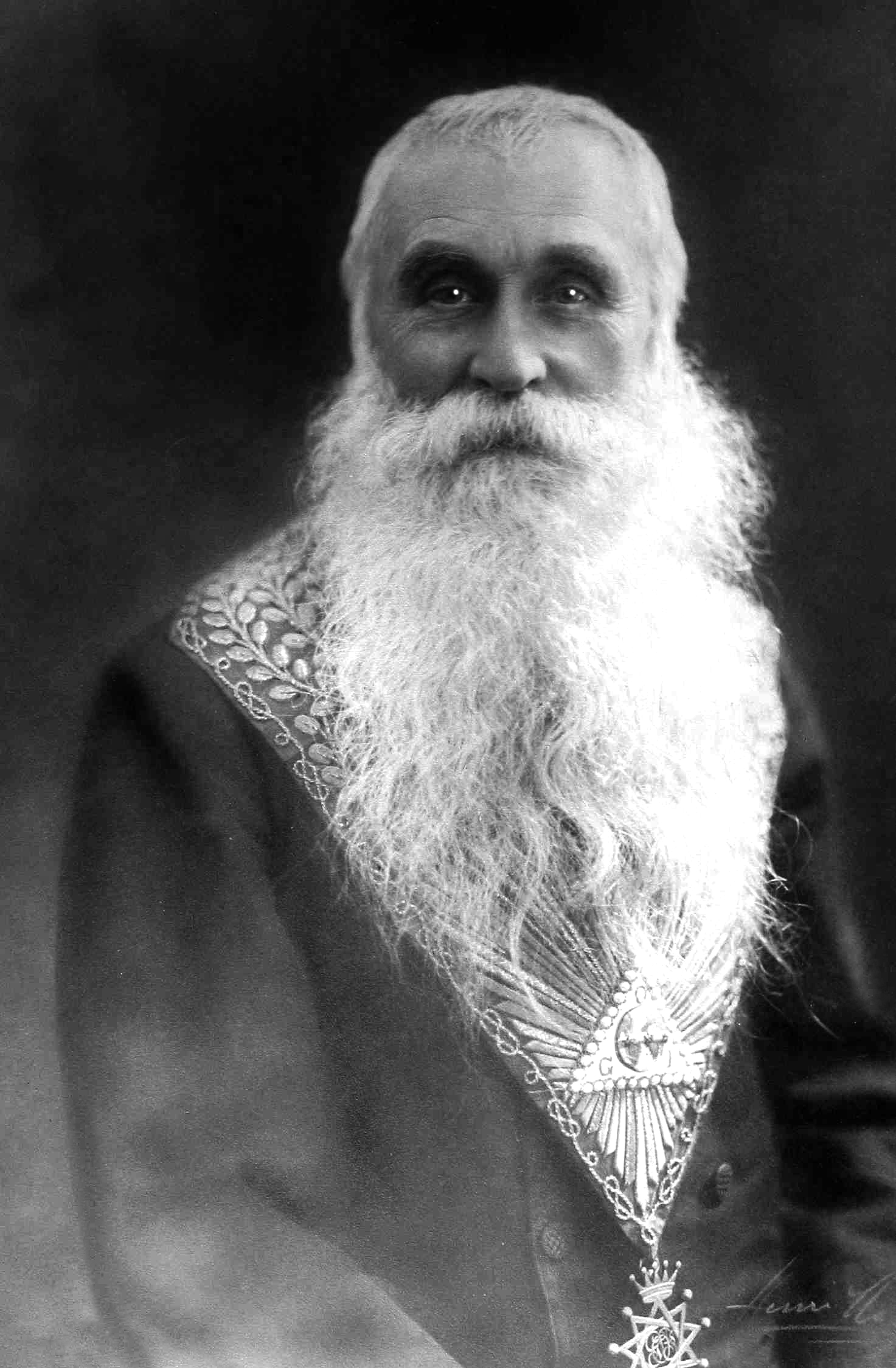
Portrait d'Arthur Groussier dressed with his Masonic decorations

Arthur Groussier (16 August 1863, Orléans – 6 February 1957, Enghien-les-Bains) was a French politician. At first he joined the Federation of the Socialist Workers of France (FTSF). In 1890 he joined the Revolutionary Socialist Workers' Party (POSR). In 1896 he joined the Revolutionary Communist Alliance (ACR), which in 1902 merged into the Socialist Party of France (PSdF), which in turn merged into the French Section of the Workers' International (SFIO) in 1905. Groussier was a member of the Chamber of Deputies from 1893 to 1902 and from 1906 to 1924. He was a very active Freemason.
