= Primitive Scottish Rite =

Masonic Rite

The Primitive Scottish Rite is a Masonic Rite. According to Robert Ambelain, an esotericist who "awakened" it in 1985, it was the rite used by the St. John of Scotland Lodge in Marseille, which was introduced to France in Saint-Germain-en-Laye from 1688; these claims are disputed by historians.

== History ==
=== History claimed by the rite ===
According to Robert Ambelain, the Primitive Scottish Rite was practised by the military Jacobite Lodges, founded by exiled Scottish and Irish Jacobite followers of the deposed Stuart King, James II of England (James VII of Scotland). The Lodges' soldiers were widely numbered enough in 1725 to form a "Very Old and Honorable Society of Freemasons in the Kingdom of France." Their rituals were introduced to Marseille in 1751 by Georges de Wallnon (or Waldon), founder of the Lodge Saint Jean d'Écosse de Marseille. They would also greatly inspire the rite of the Rite of Strict Observance and Scottish Rectified Rite. The motto of the Primitive Scottish Rite is "Primigenius More Majorem." This is the lineage claimed for the current, "Awakened", Primitive Scottish Rite by Robert Ambelain in 1985.

=== Criticism and historical research status ===
It was only in 1777, when ordered to integrate into the Grand Orient de France, that the Lodge "the Perfect Equality" of Saint-Germain-en-Laye recalled its creation in 1688 by the "Royal Irish Regiment" arriving in France following the exile of James II and VII Stuart. Historians believe this claim to be probable, but have not recovered any ritual from this early period.

As for the Lodge, "Saint Jean d'Écosse de Marseille", like the other French Lodges of that era, it claimed the prestige of having been founded not by an English or continental source, but by a patent made directly by a Scottish Jacobite aristocrat, in this case a certain "Duvalmon", "Valmont" or "Valuon"; this claim was made on 17 June 1751 by its first Venerable Master, a certain Alexander Routier. However, it was never able to present the original license, but only copies, the oldest of which dated from 1784. Moreover, it was subsequently shown that the archives of the Grand Lodge of Edinburgh contained no trace of this supposed patent. Historians today believe that the origin must be regarded as legendary and particularly stressed in 1784 in order to claim an independent origin and justify the Lodge's refusal to submit to the authority of the Grand Orient de France.

== The rituals of the rite ==
The term "Primitive Scottish Rite", or "Early Grand Scottish Rite", appeared very late in the nineteenth century in a book entitled "The Rituals of the Degrees of the Early Grand Scottish Rite", published in 1890 by Matthew McBlain. These rituals are actually the first compilation of rituals of the standard Rite of the Grand Lodge of Scotland, and have nothing to do with the Primitive Scottish Rite that emerged in the twentieth century, either in source or form.

== The scale of degrees ==
=== The original scale of degrees ===
After 1985, and several consecutive variations probably due to the progress of his research, Robert Ambelain terminated the degree hierarchy of the Primitive Scottish Rite at its fifth grade, Scottish Master / Knight of Saint Andrew. At that time, hierarchy of the Primitive Scottish Rite comprised the following grades

I. Entered Apprentice

II. Companion (French for "Fellow Craft")

III. Master Mason (or "Confirmed Companion")

IV. Installed Master (or Master of St. John or Master of Lodge)

V. Scottish Master and / or Knights of St. Andrew of Chardon

=== Degrees Practiced Today ===
Blue Lodges

I. Entered Apprentice

II. Companion

III. Master Mason

Red Lodges

IV. Installed Master (or Master of St. John or Master of Lodge)

V a. Scottish Knight of Master Saint/-\André

V b. Knights of Jerusalem (grade alternative to previous)

Internal Order

VI. Squire Novice of the Temple

VII. Chevalier du Temple

== The French Grand Lodge of the Primitive Scottish Rite ==
By the initiative of Robert Ambelain, Albert Cools and Andre Fages, the "Grand Lodge of the Primitive Scottish Rite" was formed on 20 December 1991; it attracted several other Lodges, such as « Les Ecossais Fidèles » (The Faithful Scots) from the Orient de Toulouse.

As the years passed, Robert Ambelain lost the control of the Grand Lodge he created and it fell more or less into disuse.

It subsisted only in Désiré Arnéodo, Worshipful Master of the Respectable Lodge "La Lumiere Ecossaise" of the Orient of Ollioules, who, had faithfully conserved his titles of Grand Master "of the Rite for the South of France and Beyond the Sea" and of "Grand Lodge conforming to the Patent" which was delivered by Robert Ambelain.

Robert Ambelin died in 1997. Only after that could Désiré Arnéodo pride himself on this affiliation with Robert Ambelain and the Primitive Scottish Rite, as he then inherited the title of "Most Serene National Grand Master for Life".

The French Grand Lodge of the Primitive Scottish Rite "was succeeded in 2001 by the Grand Lodge of Primitive Scottish Rite". It is a Masonic obedience with aims to perpetuate the Primitive Scottish Rite. Its lodges are working "to the Glory of God Almighty, the Sublime Architect of the Universe". In 2008, there were 9 lodges with approximately 300 members.

The Grand Lodge of the Primitive Scottish Rite claims to hold the exclusive legal and universal right to the practice of its rituals. It likewise claims that no other Masonic power is legally entitled to administer these Rites; for this reason the Primitive Scottish Rite is one of the rare rites which is not practised by the Grand Orient of France.

== See also ==
- List of Masonic rites
