= Philalethes Rite =

The Rite des philalèthes (Rite of the Philalethes) comes from Philalèthes or philalètes, which translates to: friend or seeker of truth, from the Greek Philos, friend and alètheia, truth, is in freemasonry, the name given to the Rite of the Philalethes and its practitioners. This system of philosophical or mystical Freemasonry was founded in 1773 by Marquis Charles-Pierre-Paul Savalette de Langes within the Masonic lodge "Les Amis réunis", of which he was the worshipful master and a founding member. This rite continued until the death of its founder in 1797.

== History ==
In 1775, Savalette de Langes established a commission of degrees and archives tasked with creating a plan to achieve "the knowledge of truth". After five years of work, the commission proposed a rite organized into twelve degrees, each of which involves a reception ceremony. Divided into three sections, they correspond to the progressive classification adopted in all Masonic rites. The members of this rite, which some historians describe as an "occult academy", made it a rule to reject nothing and to take an interest in mystical societies on the fringes of Freemasonry to understand the relationships between "Man and the spirits" and adopted the name "Philalèthes". This rite was primarily practiced within a subsidiary lodge attached to the main lodge: Les Amis réunis, of which Savalette de Langes was the worshipful master and one of the founding members. Barruel claimed in his writings that it was established to "combat the monarchy". Between 1775 and 1780, there were about twenty lodges in France and abroad that adhered to the Rite of the Philalèthes.

=== Philosophical Convents ===
At the height of the notoriety of this system, Savalette de Langes considered overturning the work of the Wilhelmsbad convent, which finalized the Rectified Scottish Rite in 1782. He convened the first great philosophical convent, which opened on February 15, 1785 and closed on May 26 of the same year; it was conceived as a replica of the Wilhelmsbad convent. The summons to this first convent was sent to 228 brothers and accompanied by a questionnaire or "proponenda". In ten points. It proposed a thorough analysis of the foundations of Freemasonry and its operations at that time, during a period of great rivalries between Masonic orders, these questions appeared "indiscreet", causing many representatives of lodges to defect, such as Saint-Martin, the Lavater brothers, Ferdinand de Brunswick, and Joseph de Maistre. It opened with about a hundred delegates from lodges alongside twenty-eight Philalèthes and closed its work on May 26 after thirty sessions. The circular report describes the work of this convent as insufficient, but it also reveals the intention to create a new European-sized association of Philalèthes.

A second convent was held in 1787, but it was less successful than the first. The proposed theme, on "the nature of intermediaries between gods and men" and the relationships that Freemasonry can have with such forms of communication, resulted in few responses to this invitation. In the closing letter on May 26, Savalette reproached his brothers for their lack of interest and enthusiasm. A committee met for the first and last time in 1787 to organize a third convent, but it never took place.

=== Disappearance ===
The Philalèthes system continued until 1792 and disappeared definitively upon the death of its founder in 1797. Some of the archives and the library were dispersed in 1806.

== System of the Philalèthes ==
The commission, which completed its work after five years, established a rite with twelve degrees. Every degree was connected to an alchemical process.

- The College of Symbolic Freemasonry consists of five degrees. It focuses on the traditions and the basic legend of speculative Freemasonry, namely the legend of Hiram and the punishment of his murderers:
  - Apprenti (Apprentice) - Decomposition or “calcination” of the stone
  - Compagnon (Fellow Craft) - Dissolution
  - Maître (Master) - Separation of the Elements
  - Elu - Alchemical marriage
  - Maître Ecossais (Scottish Master) - Putrefaction
- Le chapitre des chevaliers et amis réunis (The Chapter of Knights and Friends Reunited), which works on chivalric degrees and consists of three degrees or class:
  - Chevaliers d'Orient (Knights of the East) - Coagulation
  - Chevaliers Rose Croix (Knights Rose Croix) - Incineration
  - Chevaliers du temple (Knights Templar) - Sublimation
- Le conseil des écharpes blanches (The Council of White Sashes), which includes four degrees and focuses on degrees with an alchemical, theosophical, or theurgical character:
  - Philosophe inconnu (Unknown Philosopher) - Fermentation
  - Sublime philosophe (Sublime Philosopher) - Exaltation
  - Initié (Initiate) - Multiplication
  - Philalèthe - Projection

== Philalethes Society ==
The Philalethes Society is an international association for Masonic study and research, with no direct connection to the Rite of the Philalèthes, established in October 1928 by American Freemasons. It includes an unlimited number of corresponding members and forty fellows selected from the most eminent Masons. Its motto is: "There is no Religion higher than the Truth", which is also the motto of the Theosophical Society. Among its most famous members are Rudyard Kipling, Armand Bédarride, and Oswald Wirth, for example. It disseminates its work through the magazine Philalethes Magazine.

== Bibliography ==
- Daniel Ligou, Dictionnaire de la franc-maçonnerie, Presses universitaires de France (PUF), 1987, Reprint 1998, 1359 pages, ISBN 2-13-048639-8.
- Charles Porset, Les Philalèthes et les Convents de Paris: une politique de la folie, Honoré Champion, 1996, 776 pages, ISBN 978-2-85203-534-8.
- Collectif, Encyclopédie de la franc-maçonnerie, Le Livre de poche, 2008, 982 pages, ISBN 978-2-253-13032-1.
