= Rite Primitif de Narbonne =

Le Rite Primitif de Narbonne or Rite Primitif des Philadelphes, is a Masonic rite that was introduced in 1759, brought from Prague by Vicomte de Chefdebien d'Aigrefeuille.

== Background ==
The active proponent of this rite was his son, Marquis François Chefdebien d'Armissan, a member of the Ordre des Frères Africains. Marquis François Chefdebien d'Armissan, also a Knight of Malta, played a significant role in propagating the Rite Primitif de Narbonne. The primary lodge associated with this rite was "Les Philadelphes de Narbonne," established in 1779. It is from this Mother Lodge that the rite earned the name "Rite Primitif des Philadelphes."

The Rite Primitif de Narbonne comprises three classes of instruction, each consisting of 10 degrees. In reality, some of these degrees are a collection of individual grades:

- 1st Class: The three blue degrees:
  - Entered Apprentice
  - Fellow Craft
  - Master Mason
- 2nd Class, Subdivided into 3:
  - Maître Parfait, Elu, et Architecte (Master Perfect, Chosen, and Architect).
  - Sublime Ecossais (Sublime Scottish).
  - Chevalier de l'épée, Chevalier de l'Orient, et Prince de Jérusalem (Knight of the Sword, Knight of the East, and Prince of Jerusalem).

In essence, these first two classes serve as an introduction to the third class, which contains the true essence of the Rite The third class consists of four chapters related to the Rose+Croix:

- 1st Symbolic Chapter: An in-depth study of the symbolism of the fraternité secrète (secret brotherhood).
- 2nd Historical Chapter: A study of the history of the Tradition and its transmission from mystery school to mystery school.
- 3rd Philosophical Chapter: An exploration of la science maçonnique (Masonic science).
- 4th Chapter of Rose + Cross of Grand Rosary: Exclusively dedicated to occultism, with the aim of "la réintégration spirituelle de l'homme" (the spiritual reintegration of man).

The Rite Primitif de Narbonne is a distinctive Masonic tradition with a rich history, characterized by its unique structure and focus on symbolism, history, philosophy, and the spiritual development of its members.

== See also ==
- Rose+Croix (Rose+Croix)
- Masonic Rites
- Freemasonry
