= Tracing board =

Illustrations depicting symbols of Freemasonry

Tracing boards are painted or printed illustrations depicting the various emblems and symbols of Freemasonry. They can be used as teaching aids during the lectures that follow each of the Masonic Degrees, when an experienced member explains the various concepts of Freemasonry to new members. They can also be used by experienced members as reminders of the concepts they learned as they went through the ceremonies of the different masonic degrees.

== History and development ==
A Third Degree tracing board

=== Floor and table designs ===
In the eighteenth century Masonic lodges met chiefly in private rooms above taverns, and the symbolic designs used in catechesis were chalked on the table or floor in the centre of the hired room, usually by the Tyler or the Worshipful Master. Evidence suggests that a simple boundary was drawn (usually a square or rectangle, or sometimes a cross) within which various Masonic symbols were added, often of a geometric type (such as a circle or pentagram). In many lodges the boundary shape may have been drawn by the Tyler, with the Master adding the symbolic detail. Later various symbolic objects were incorporated, examples including a ladder, a beehive, and an hourglass, and sometimes drawings were interchangeable with physical objects. At the end of the work a new member was often required to erase the drawing with a mop, as a practical demonstration of his obligation of secrecy.

Though the various Grand Lodges were then generally hostile to the creation of any physical representations of the ritual and symbols of the Craft, the time-consuming business of redrawing the symbols at every meeting was gradually replaced by keeping a removable "floor cloth" on which the various symbols were painted. Different portions might be exposed according to the work being executed. By the second half of the eighteenth century the Masonic symbols were being painted on a variety of removable materials ranging from small marble slabs to canvas, to give a more decorative and elaborate symbolic display.

=== Painted boards ===
During the nineteenth century there was a rapid expansion of the use of permanent painted tracing boards, usually painted on canvas and framed in wood. Many artists produced competing designs, and most lodges commissioned sets of bespoke boards which were therefore of a unique design, despite following common themes. Some designs became particularly popular, leading to some repetition of favoured design features. Boards by John Cole and Josiah Bowring were examples of popularly recurring designs.

The English artist John Harris was initiated in 1818 and produced many different series of tracing boards, including a miniature set of 1823 which became popular after Harris dedicated the design to Prince Augustus Frederick, Duke of Sussex, the Grand Master of the United Grand Lodge of England (UGLE). Eventually the Emulation Lodge of Improvement sought to bring a measure of standardisation in tracing board design, and organised a competition in 1845, to which many different designs were submitted. Harris himself submitted at least two different sets to the competition, but one of his designs was the winner. Harris revised the designs in 1849, and these "Emulation" tracing boards are today considered a definitive design within British and Commonwealth Freemasonry.

== Contemporary use ==
In lodges under the UGLE, and many jurisdictions derived from English Freemasonry, tracing boards are an essential part of lodge furniture, sometimes displayed flat on the floor, and sometimes vertically against a pedestal or on the wall. Sets of three boards, usually of older designs, may often be found in special cases for storage and display within lodge rooms. There are sometimes tracing boards in other degrees. The Royal Arch tracing board has fallen into disuse in most places, and examples are now rare. In the Mark Master Mason and Royal Ark Mariner degrees as administered from London, the tracing boards have experienced a great revival in popularity from the end of the twentieth century, and official rituals for the explanations of these tracing boards are again in regular use in English lodges.

As different Masonic jurisdictions established official, or standard, degree rituals the creation of new tracing boards by artists waned, and has since largely disappeared in favour of standard designs. Nonetheless, some masonic artists have experimented with very modern designs for the twenty-first century.

== Publications ==
- Haunch, T. O. (April 2004). Tracing Boards: Their Development and Designers. QC Correspondence Circle Ltd. ISBN 0-907655-95-5.
- Rees, Julian (2009). Tracing Boards of the Three Degrees of Craft Freemasonry Explained. Lewis Masonic. ISBN 978-0-85318-334-1.
