= Lectures of the Three Degrees in Craft Masonry =

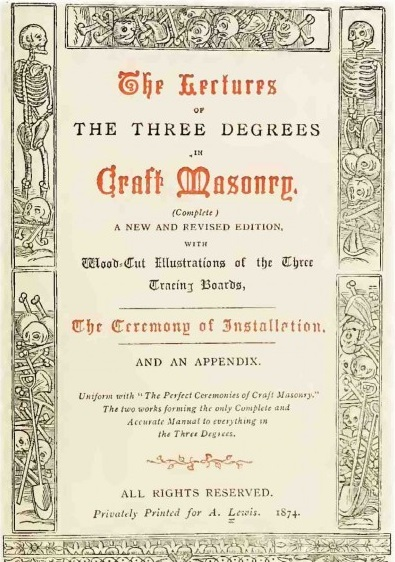
Title page of the Lectures, 1874

The Lectures of the Three Degrees in Craft Masonry is a series of manuals on Freemasonry that are arranged in the form of catechisms to be memorized. They cover rituals and symbolism associated with the three degrees of Craft Freemasonry in question and answer form. During the second half of the 19th century, the Lectures gradually ceased to be used regularly in English Lodges.

== Purpose ==
The question and answer procedure was the traditional way in which Freemasons were instructed in Masonic ritual and symbolism before printed ritual books became more widely available. Usually, the members of a Masonic Lodge would sit around a table and the Worshipful Master would ask set questions of each member in turn to test their knowledge of the Masonic ritual and moral teachings. Replies and questions were stylized and a Freemason would have to demonstrate proficiency in answering the questions about his Masonic Degree before he would be allowed to proceed to the next degree. These catechisms became known as "Lectures of the Craft" and were gradually developed into a comprehensive instructional system that covered not only the ritual and symbolism, but also the spirit and morals of Freemasonry. Like the actual Lodge rituals, also the Lectures were revised from time to time as Freemasonry developed.

== History ==
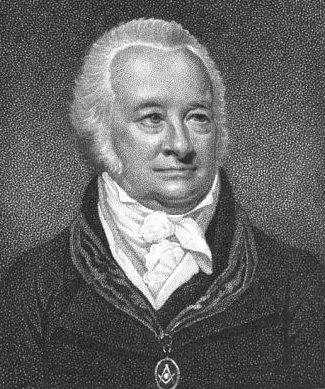
William Preston, from the 1812 edition of "Illustrations of Masonry"

=== Origins of the Lectures ===
From the 18th century onwards, there were different systems of Masonic Lectures in circulation. William Preston's system of Lectures, developed from 1772 onwards, and John Browne's Master Key, first published in full in 1801, were the first to reach a broader audience. By the time the United Grand Lodge of England (UGLE) was formed in 1813 there were at least three systems of Masonic Lectures current in the London area.

=== Union of 1813 ===
At the formation of the United Grand Lodge of England (UGLE) in 1813, the various Masonic rituals then in use in England and Wales were standardized under the supervision of the Duke of Sussex. A new Masonic ritual for use by UGLE was worked out by the "Lodge of Reconciliation" and it was soon realized that the system of Lectures would also have to be adapted, for the purpose of instruction in the new UGLE procedures and to suit the Masonic symbolism to the new UGLE practice.

When the Duke of Sussex was asked what should be done about the Lectures, he replied to the effect that the Worshipful Masters of the various Masonic Lodges should adapt their existing Lectures to the new standardized UGLE ceremonies and give them in their own words. Accordingly, none of the different systems of Masonic Lectures then in circulation ever received formal approval from UGLE in the same way as approval was accorded in 1816 to the new Masonic ritual worked out by the "Lodge of Reconciliation". The result was that the Lectures were not revised and they gradually ceased to be given as part of regular Lodge meetings. Only a few Lodges continued using the Lectures regularly.

=== Grand Stewards' Lodge ===
Over time, the version of the Lectures developed for the Grand Stewards' Lodge in London became the most widely accepted. The system of questions and answers demonstrated regularly by the Grand Stewards' Lodge was based closely on the catechism contained in John Browne's Master Key, which itself represented the standard usage of the Lectures by the former Premier Grand Lodge of England. By 1817, this had been adapted to conform to the new UGLE ritual put forward by the "Lodge of Reconciliation", and arranged into 15 individual sections that were grouped into three Lectures, one for each degree of Craft Freemasonry.

=== Emulation Lodge ===
When the regular demonstrations of the Lectures by the Grand Stewards' Lodge ceased in the 1860s, the Emulation Lodge of Improvement, formed in 1823, became the leading body regularly working them. The Emulation Lodge of Improvement has demonstrated the Grand Steward's Lodge system of Lectures continuously since 1823, although rehearsal of the Emulation Ritual has always been its main work. These lectures are still published by Lewis Masonic to this day.

While some light alterations have been made since the 1860s to the version of the Lectures that was originally developed for the Grand Stewards' Lodge (indeed the Grand Stewards' Lodge made some revisions in the early 1860s), the Lectures still demonstrated by the Emulation Lodge of Improvement are largely those which were worked in 1817 and, except for the necessary corrections to fit them to the new UGLE procedures after 1813, they have very much the same content as the Lectures worked in English Freemasonry in the late 18th century.

== See also ==
- History of Freemasonry

https://www.lewismasonic.co.uk/ritual/craft-ritual/emulation-lectures-of-the-three-degrees-2021-edition-.htm
