= John Harris Jr. (artist) =

English artist

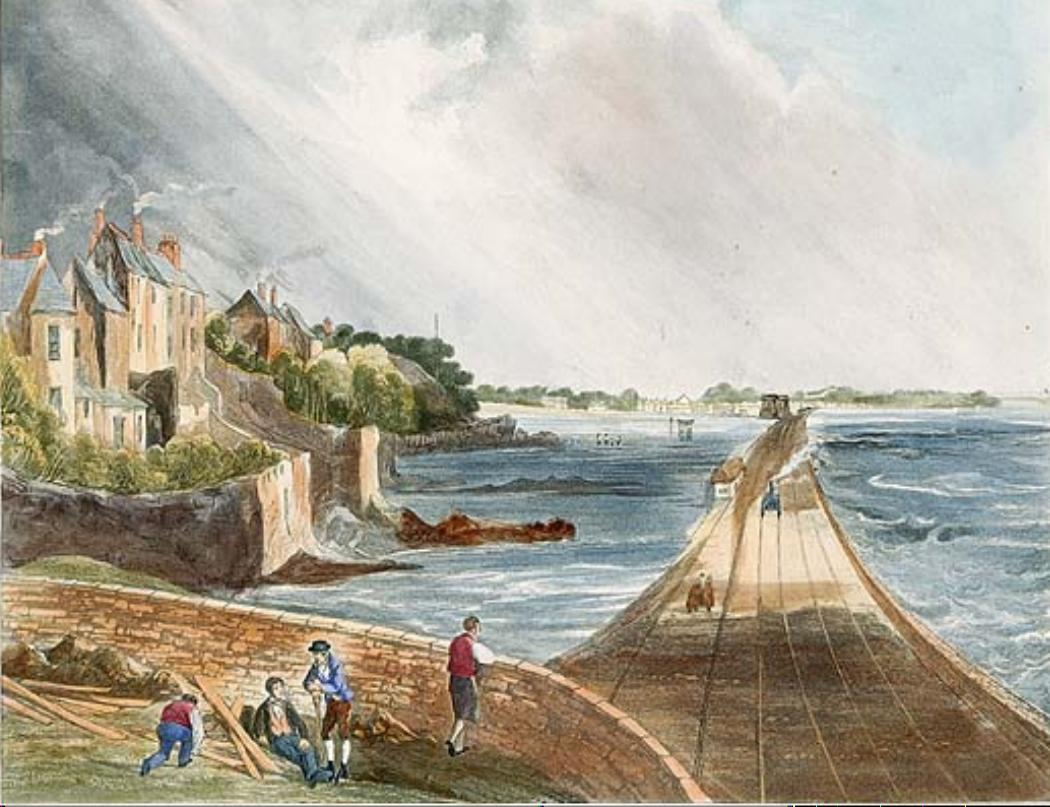
View from Blackrock towards Merrion, by John Harris

John Harris Jr. (17 November 1791 – 28 December 1873), was an English artist who specialised in pen-and-ink facsimile work, and Masonic catechetical designs.

His father was John Harris (1767–1832), the watercolour painter. His son, also John Harris, continued his work after Harris himself became incapacitated, and after his death.

== Facsimiles ==
Harris earned his income as an artist chiefly from the production of facsimiles, used to replace pages (or entire sections) of books which had been damaged or become decayed. Harris himself suggested that the process of replacing damaged pages with facsimile reproductions was first popularised by George Spencer, 2nd Earl Spencer, who commissioned such work through Harris's employer, John Whittaker. The practice of adding pen facsimiles to replace missing pages in early printed books was common in the nineteenth century, especially for "collectors who preferred their works to be prinstine and perfect."

During his time working at the British Museum (from 1820 onwards), Harris repaired or replaced sections of many books in the national collection, and contemporary reports state that his facsimile work was entirely indistinguishable from the original. A British Museum colleague, Robert Cowtan, gave an account of the examination of a book from the national collection by the British Museum's foremost book experts, Messrs Panizzi, Jones, and Watts, and their abject failure to discover the reproduced sections. "After a fruitless search, page by page, the consultation ended in a summons to Mr. Harris himself to point out the leaves that he had supplied." Cowtan also stated of Harris, "In this curious art he is probably unrivalled....and some of the leaves that he has supplied are so perfectly done that, after a few years, he has himself been puzzled to distinguish his own work from the original, so perfect has the facsimile been, both in paper and typography."

It was because of the success of Harris's work that the Trustees of the British Museum enacted a regulation that all facsimile pages added to restored books must be marked with a symbol at the base of the page, so that the librarians of future generations would be able to distinguish original pages from reproductions.

It is known that Harris carried out book restoration work for Prince Augustus Frederick, Duke of Sussex, the Grand Master of English Freemasonry. In 1841 the Duke wrote to Albert, Prince Consort (through the Prince Consort's household Treasurer) warmly commending the work of Harris, and stating that he had "experienced much advantage from his services in my library".

== Tracing boards ==
Harris became a Freemason in 1818, at a time when the United Grand Lodge of England was encouraging all masonic lodges to move from Tracing boards chalked on the floor, or painted onto cloths, towards permanent painted and framed boards, displayed in lodge rooms. Harris quickly became fascinated by masonic tracing boards, and painted large numbers of boards for each of the three degrees of Freemasonry, in multiple different designs. Many of his boards remain extant, and Harris made a significant income from designing and selling the boards. In 1823 he dedicated a set of miniature tracing boards to Prince Augustus Frederick, Duke of Sussex, the Grand Master of the United Grand Lodge, which further enhanced his reputation.

In 1845 the Emulation Lodge of Improvement ran a competition for the design of a standardised set of tracing boards, to be recommended for use in all lodges. Harris submitted designs for all three degrees, and was the immediate winner of the competition. He made slight alterations, and issued a revised form of the designs in 1849, and these "Emulation" tracing boards are today considered a definitive design in much of the English-speaking world of Regular Masonic jurisdictions. The enormous original boards are still in use by the Emulation Lodge of Improvement, and may be viewed weekly, although they are sealed in protective glass cases. Harris's original proof designs for the Emulation boards, and several other designs, are all today in the possession of the Sussex Masonic Museum in Brighton.

In 1957 the original Harris tracing boards, in regular use for well over a century, were found to be falling into a state of decay. They were meticulously restored following an appeal for funds. The boards were found to be painted on mahogany sheets, which were fixed to mahogany panelling by means of 900 countersunk screws (300 per board), with the art painted on the top level and then varnished. During the complex restoration of the cracked and split boards, cracks were filled and stippled with colour-matched paint before a fresh layer of varnish was applied. The restored boards returned to use in October 1957.

== Private life ==
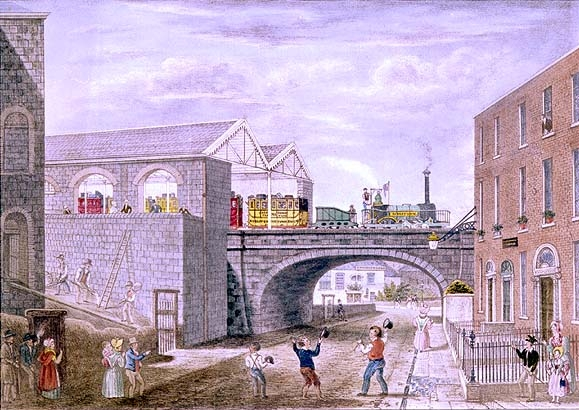
Harris's painting of the opening of the Dublin & Kingstown Railway in 1834.

Harris was married in 1820. He and his wife, Mary, had eight children, five of whom died in infancy. Two sons and a daughter survived to adulthood. Their son, also named John Harris, shared in his father's artistic work.

Harris suffered poor health in his advancing years. Following a stroke in 1850 he began to lose his sight, and in 1856 or 1857 became completely blind. He also suffered a further stroke at about the same time, and was severely paralysed. Unable to work, Harris became impoverished, but was supported by the masonic charitable foundations, chiefly the Asylum for Worthy, Aged, and Decayed Freemasons, which became part of the later Royal Masonic Benevolent Institution (RMBI). In his latter years Harris wrote some poetry, including pieces in praise of masonic charity, and some of his work was published. Harris and his wife lived in the RMBI residential home at East Croydon, where he died on 28 December 1873.

He was buried in Queen's Road Cemetery, Croydon, where his wife was later also interred. Owing to their impoverished lifestyle their grave was not marked with a stone, and its location was eventually lost. Following research the site of the grave was rediscovered in 2016, and Surrey Freemasons, led in particular by the members of the Croydon Lodge of Endeavour No. 7315, purchased the grave plot from Croydon London Borough Council and had a headstone erected. The stone follows the dimensions of a Harris tracing board, topped with a Victorian gothic arch. It is engraved with John and Mary's names, and masonic symbols, together with a coded message written in the masonic cypher used by Harris on his tracing board designs. The stone was dedicated during a Church of England graveside service in September 2018, attended by Freemasons representing the Province of Surrey, the United Grand Lodge of England, and the Emulation Lodge of Improvement.
