= Karl Gotthelf von Hund =

German freemason

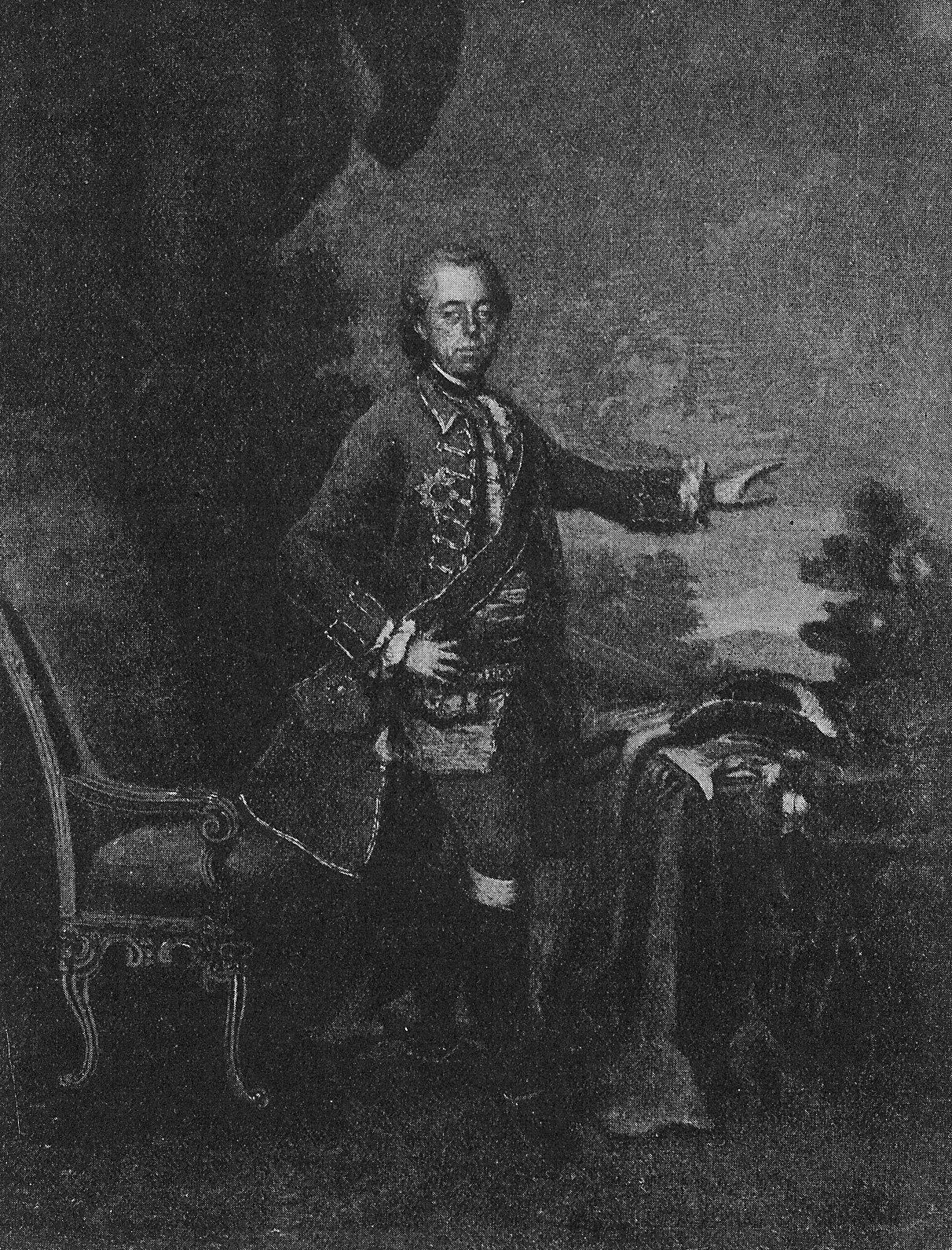
Karl Gotthelf von Hund und Altengrotkau

Karl Gotthelf, Baron von Hund und Altengrotkau (11 September 1722, Unwürde - 8 November 1776, Meiningen) was a German freemason. In 1751, he founded the Rite of Strict Observance.

== Childhood and youth ==
Karl Gotthelf von Hund came from Silesia, descended from Henry von Hund und Altengrotkau (ca 1480). Henry's son was Commander of the Order of Malta in Glatz, where in 1518 and 1523 he held the Office of the Governor. Documents from around 1300 show John and Christopher von Hund, but it is not proven that they belong to the line that later became Altengrotkau. Karl Gotthelf's father, Joachim Hildebrand von Hund was chamberlain and Electoral Saxon landowner. The family of von Hund and Altengrotkau owned their estate from 1607 and from 1704 the estate of Upper Kittlitz in Upper Lusatia. Karl's father died very early, so that his still minor son inherited the estate. The guardianship of the son and his mother fell to Caspar Heinrich von Rodewitz. Karl Gotthelf was the youngest of three children, but his elders died before his birth, so that he was entitled to special care and a good teaching. He studied in Leipzig from 1737 to 1739. Then he joined the Army under the command of Colonel Friedrich von Schoenberg. Because of the death of his beloved, the daughter of his guardian, von Hund decided never to marry. Hund became chamberlain to the elector of Cologne.

== First contacts with Freemasonry ==
In 1741 Hund was at the coronation of Charles VII in Frankfurt, where he was admitted to the Masonic brotherhood. From December 1742 till September 1743 he was in Paris, and there converted to Catholicism under the influence of a noble lady. On 20 February 1743, he became Master of a lodge. On 25 August 1743 he served at the foundation of a lodge as senior warden.

Later, he claimed that it was in Paris in 1743 that he was initiated, by Scottish knights, into the Order of the Knights Templar, and was introduced to the pretender to the British throne, Prince Charles Edward Stuart, as the Grand Master of the (supposedly resurrected) Knights Templar. Present were the Earl of Kilmarnock and other senior Jacobites. He was initiated by the "Knight of the Red Feather", whose identity he pledged to conceal, but he may have tried to hint that it was Charles Edward Stuart. There is no documentary proof of any such Masonic lodge. Hund claimed to have been appointed by these "unknown superiors" of the Templars as "commander in chief" (Provincial Grand Master) of the Order of Province VII (Germany). As proof, he presented an encoded "military chief patent", which remains undeciphered. Hund wrapped himself in silence and in more detailed inquiries repeatedly underlined his discretion with respect to the "unknown superiors", who had supposedly charged him with the revival of the Templar Order in Germany. Hund's relationship to the alleged French Templar Order is unclear, and his surviving diary entries give little information.

== Masonic work ==
In 1749 Hund established the Lodge of Three Columns on his estate at Unwürde in association with the brothers of the neighboring Lodge of Three Hammers at Naumburg. After returning to Germany in 1750 Hund settled in Lower Kittlitz. The castle of Kittlitz, built by him, has an octagonal floor plan, which is interpreted as a Masonic symbol. After several failed attempts, the court of the pretender Charles Edward Stuart was contacted, and the establishment of the seventh province of the Templars taken in hand. From 1751 he founded the Rite of Strict Observance within Freemasonry. He always promoted the idea of a line of descent from the Templars to the Freemasons. First he founded in 1751 on his estate, the Strict Observance chapter of "The three pillars", which initially consisted of only him and his best childhood friend from Schoenberg. In 1755 he created for the community of the Knights Templar a plan of operations for the recruitment of persons of high rank. Its members gave themselves religious-sounding names. Hund had the name Carolus Eques ab Ense (Latin for Charles Knight of the Sword) or Chevalier de l'Épée (same in French).

== The Rite of Strict Observance ==
The new Scottish Rite that Hund introduced to Germany, he named "Rectified Masonry" and, after 1764, the Rite of Strict Observance, while referring to the English system of Freemasonry as the Late Observance.

In 1764 Hund's estate had been badly affected by the Seven Years' War, and his confidence was damaged by his inability to contact his Jacobite superiors for certification of his position and ritual. He was contacted by George Frederick Johnson, who had been accepted by the lodge at Jena as their masonic mentor, and now claimed superiority over all other lodges in Germany and Bohemia. Those who accepted his rule had their own charters and papers burned, and their leaders re-initiated (at some expense) into Johnson's system of higher degrees. Hoping that Johnson was his desired link to his own missing superiors, Hund agreed to meet, and Johnson brought his entire entourage, with representatives of his subordinate lodges. However, Johnson's bizarre behaviour, and his failure to produce promised material, convinced both Hund and his own people that he was a fraud. He was later found to be a German confidence trickster called Johann Samuel Lechte. When their discredited mentor left, his lodges turned to Hund as the unexpected hero of the hour, who now found himself at the head of a movement.

The Rite appealed to German national pride, attracted the non-nobility, and was allegedly directed by "Unknown Superiors". The Rite of Strict Observance was particularly devoted to the reform of Masonry, with special reference to the elimination of the occult sciences which at the time were widely practiced in many lodges, and the establishment of cohesion and homogeneity in Masonry through the enforcement of strict discipline, the regulation of functions, etc.

Despite its initial popularity, growing dissatisfaction among members over the failure to being initiated into the mysteries of the Unknown Superiors led to the Strict Observance being dissolved in 1782. They decided at a convent in Wilhelmsbad, under Jean-Baptiste Willermoz, that the Freemasons were not descended from the Templars, and reconstituted the order as the Rectified Scottish Rite.

== Hund's Legacy ==
From today's perspective Hund was not a charlatan, like many of his contemporaries. It is clear that Hund had been enthusiastic and relatively easy to influence. Even as a young man he loved the poets of antiquity and all the ideals of the chivalric spirit. He worshiped chivalric ideals, which in other high-level systems of Freemasonry of the 18th Century were strongly expressed. Hund preached with enthusiasm, all his mature life, the mistaken view that Freemasonry sprang from the alleged remnant of the Templar Order, and strove to resurrect it. Masonic historians considered Hund to be a man of kindness and brotherhood, who sacrificed everything for his ideals. He could have led a life of prosperity, and risen to prominence in court and state. In all this he resigned in favour of religious thought. He suffered pains, hostility and persecution until his death, always in the mistaken view that he had become an emissary of the Knights Templar. Challenged at the 11th Convention of Brunswick (June 1775) about the "unknown superiors" who allegedly introduced him in Paris to the system of the Strict Observance, Hund is said to have assured his questioners, with tears, that his oath and his conscience forbade reply.

For Freemasonry and the system he established, the Strict Observance, he sacrificed a lot of time, money and almost his entire estate. With what sacrifice he persevered in his teaching is shown when, already very ill, in 1776 he traveled to Meiningen to persuade the reigning Duke Friedrich August to adopt the Strict Observance. Shortly after, he died of "a fever" and was buried in full regalia in the town church of Mellrichstadt (Bavaria). He wore his Army Master ring with the initials N.V.I.O., i.e., "nulla vi invertur ordo" ("No power can overthrow the Order"), the motto of the Strict Observance.

== Bibliography ==
- Eugen Lennhoff, Oskar Posner, Dieter A. Binder: Internationales Freimaurerlexikon. 5. überarbeitete und erweiterte Neuauflage der Ausgabe von 1932. Herbig, München 2006, ISBN 978-3-7766-2478-6.
- Ferdinand Runkel: Geschichte der Freimaurerei. 3 Bände. Reprint von 1932, Edition Lempertz, Königswinter 2006, ISBN 3-933070-96-1. Bd. 1, S. 193 ff.
