= Rite Opératif de Salomon =

Masonic rite

The Rite Opératif de Salomon (Operative Rite of Solomon) is a Masonic rite that appeared in the 1970s as a result of research by Jacques de La Personne, then president of the Rituals Commission and deputy grand orator of the Grand Orient de France. It proposes to the Freemasons who practice it, a very symbolic approach of Freemasonry, with a particular accent put on the ceremonial of the Masonic meetings. This rite is mainly practiced within the Initiatic and Traditional Order of the Royal Art (OITAR) that Jacques de La Personne created in 1974.

== History ==
Jacques de La Personne, who entered Freemasonry at the Grand Orient de France on December 16, 1959, belongs to this generation of Freemasons who are passionate about the study of the French Rite from the sources of the texts, in the movement of brothers like René Guilly, for example. Initiated in the lodge "Les Inséparables du Progrès", he began his work in this workshop of which he became Worshipful Master in 1964. Becoming deputy grand orator and president of the commission of rites of the Grand Orient de France, it is mandated by it to carry out his project that he obtains a patent to create the lodge "Les Hommes" which practices in experimental form the result of his work, namely: the first three degrees of what will become the Operative Rite of Solomon. The lodge was created on February 7, 1972.

The lodge "Les Hommes" still practices this rite. Thereafter, anxious to continue the experience of creating an original rite in the twentieth century in a freer, and wishing to open to the mix, it creates the Initiatory and Traditional Order of the Royal Art in January 1974 and detaches itself from the GODF to constitute an independent structure. The first lodge created in this new framework, "The Founders" became lodge number one of the OITAR2.

For nearly ten years, followed by several brothers and sisters from the GODF, but also from Droit Humain, he worked on the development of the rite both in terms of ritual books (ceremonies of the various degrees, etc.) but also in terms of books called: of operation, setting the uses and instructions of the order and its lodges. In the early 1980s, the project to continue to perfect the rite, within a lodge of research and study: the lodge "Hermes" is born. It is in particular to experiment with a new symbolic structure and in particular a different order of the Masonic degrees. The goal admitted by its designer is to make the second degree of blue masonry (the first three grades) the symbolic pivot of the rite.

== Degrees of the Rite ==
The Rite Opératif de Salomon consists of nine degrees organized into three distinct orders, representing a progressive path of Masonic development. This structured system reflects the order's commitment to comprehensive spiritual and philosophical advancement.

Structure of the Operative Order of Temple Builders
Order Level	Classification	Degrees
First Order (Operative Path - Five Degrees)	Craft Degrees	1. Apprentice (Entered, Registered, Accomplished); 2. Companion (Passed, Practiced, Finished); 3. Master (Elevated, Experienced, Installed); 4. Secret Master (Interior Royalty); 5. Master Mason of the Mark (Humility, relativity of knowledge)
Second Order (Chivalric Path - Two Degrees)	Chivalric Order of Solomon's Temple	6. Knight of the Royal Arch (Discovery of the Lost Word); 7. Rose+Cross Knight (Accomplishment of virtues)
Third Order (Sacerdotal Path - Two Degrees)	Interior Order of the Holy Temple	8. Light Bearers (Universality of tradition); 9. Master of the Ineffable Name (Understanding of the lost word)
Each degree builds upon the previous, creating a comprehensive path of Masonic knowledge and spiritual development.

This hierarchical structure provides a framework for progressive initiation and understanding, with each level building upon the knowledge and experience gained in previous degrees. The journey from Apprentice through the Sacerdotal Order represents both a personal transformation and a deepening engagement with Masonic symbolism and philosophy. The regalia for the Rite Opératif de Salomon are based on the color blue and white.
