= Grand College of Rites =

Masonic organization

- Formation: May 12, 1932; 94 years ago
- Founded at: Washington, D.C., United States
- Purpose: Ritual studies

The Grand College of Rites (officially, the Grand College of Rites of the United States of America) is a Masonic organization.

The Grand College of Rites was established by nine Master Masons in Washington, D.C., on May 12, 1932, for the purpose of controlling and preventing the resurrection of abandoned and unauthorized rituals in the United States.

The college conducts searches around the world for obscure and defunct rituals of extinct Masonic organizations and prints them in a limited volume titled Collectanea, available only to members of the college, so as to establish copyright over them and prevent their resurrection. Its work has been credited with helping stamp out the spread of clandestine and irregular Masonic bodies in the United States.

Among the rituals over which the Grand College claims jurisdiction are those of the Egyptian Masonic Rite of Memphis, Ancient, Free, and Accepted Architects, Ancient and Primitive Rite, and others.

== See also ==
- Masonic Appendant Bodies
- List of Masonic Rites
