= Rite of Strict Observance =

Series of progressive degrees

The Rite of Strict Observance was a Rite of Freemasonry, a series of progressive degrees that were conferred by the Order of Strict Observance, a Masonic body of the 18th century.

== History ==
Baron Karl Gotthelf von Hund (1722–1776) introduced a new "Scottish" Rite to Germany, which he renamed "Rectified Masonry" and, after 1764, the "Strict Observance", while referring to the English system of Freemasonry as the "Late Observance."

The Rite appealed to German national pride, attracted the non-nobility, and was allegedly directed by "Unknown Superiors". The Strict Observance was particularly devoted to the reform of Masonry, with special reference to the elimination of the occult sciences which at the time were widely practiced in many lodges, and the establishment of cohesion and homogeneity in Masonry through the enforcement of strict discipline, the regulation of functions, etc.

By 1768 the Rite of Strict Observance counted some forty lodges.

Despite its initial popularity, growing dissatisfaction among members over the failure to being initiated into the mysteries of the Unknown Superiors led to the Convent of Wilhelmsbad in 1782. The delegates there renounced their Templar origins (not unanimously) and gave greater self-governance to the lodges, resulting in the order fragmenting and the lodges adopting other rites over the next few years.

== Degree structure ==
The degrees of the Rite of Strict Observance were:

- 1° Entered Apprentice (sometimes just called Apprentice)
- 2° Fellow Craft (sometimes just called Fellow)
- 3° Master Mason (sometimes just called Master)
- 4° Scot (sometimes also called Scottish Master)
- 5° Novice (sometimes also called Squire Novice)
- 6° Templar (sometimes also called Knight Templar)
- 7° Professed Knight (sometimes just called Professed)

== See also ==
- Rectified Scottish Rite
- Swedish Rite
- List of Masonic Rites
