= John Yarker =

English Freemason

John Yarker (1833–1913)

John Yarker (17 April 1833 – 20 March 1913) was an English Freemason, author, and occultist. He was born in Swindale, Shap, Westmorland, in the north of England. He moved with his parents to Lancashire and on to Manchester in 1849. Ηe was descended from Reinhold Yarker de Laybourne who lived in the mid 17th century.

== Biography ==
He was made a Freemason of the United Grand Lodge of England at the age of 21 in the Lodge of Integrity, No. 189, Manchester, on 25 October 1854, becoming a Master Mason at the beginning of 1855. Seven years later, in 1862, he demitted (resigned) from Freemasonry.

In 1872 Yarker established the Sovereign Sanctuary of the Ancient and Primitive Rite of Masonry for England and Ireland under the authority of a Patent issued by the American Grand Master of that organization, Harry Seymour. As well as establishing the Ancient and Primitive Rite, Yarker would later become Deputy International Grand Master (1900) and International Grand Master (1902) of the Rite of Memphis-Misraim, succeeding to Giuseppe Garibaldi.

He died in Withington, Lancashire.

Later scholars of Freemasonry and esoteric movements described Yarker as a valuable source of information, but also objected to his tendency to speculate in an attempt to establish an ancient pedigree for Freemasonry.

== Writings ==
- Yarker, John. Notes on the Orders of the Temple and St. John and the Jerusalem Encampment, Manchester. Manchester: n.p., 1869.
- Yarker, John. Notes on the Scientific and Religious Mysteries of Antiquity; The Gnosis and Secret Schools of the Middle Ages; Modern Rosicrucianism; and the Various Rites and Degrees of Free and Accepted Masonry. London: J. Hogg, 1872; rpt. New York: J. W. Bouton, 1878.
- Yarker, John. Masonic Charges and Lectures, A Series Translated from the French. Manchester: Isaac W. Petty & Son, 1880.
- Yarker, John. "English Ghost Stories," Theosophist, Feb 1880, 1: 114.
- Yarker, John. Manual of the Degrees of the Antient and Primitive Rite of Masonry, Issued by the Sovereign Sanctuary, 33rd Degree, in and for Great Britain and Ireland. S.l.: n.p., 1881.
- Yarker, John. "The Beni Elohim," Theosophist, Aug 1881, 2: 237–8.
- Yarker, John. "The Beni Elohim and the Book of Enoch," Theosophist, Apr 1882, 3: 171–2.
- Yarker, John. Genealogy of the Surname Yarker; With the Leyburn, and Several Allied Families, Resident in the Counties of Yorkshire, Durham, Westmoreland, and Lancashire, Including All of the Name in Cumberland, Canada, America, and Middlesex (from the Conquest to the Present Time). Manchester: A. M. Petty, 1882.
- Yarker, John. "Can the Double Murder—Or Produce Results on the Material Body," Theosophist, Mar 1883, 4: 149–50;
- Yarker, John. "The Adwaita Philosophy versus the Semitic Bible," Theosophist, Apr 1883, 4: 175.
- Yarker, John. Recapitulation of All Masonry, or, A Description and Explanation of the Universal Hieroglyph of the Master of Masters. Dublin: Sovereign Sanctuary, 1883.
- Yarker, John. Speculative Freemasonry: A Historical Lecture Upon the Origin of Craft and High Grade Freemasonry, and Showing the Great Antiquity of the Combined System, Delivered Before the Brethren of the Palatine and Jerusalem Chapter, No. 2 on the Roll of the Sovereign Sanctuary of the Antient and Primitive Rite of Masonry in and for the United Kingdom of Great Britain and Ireland, in Assembly at Their Place of Meeting, the Grosvenor Hotel, Deansgate, Manchester, 26 November 1883. Liverpool: Joseph Hawkins, 1883.
- Yarker, John. The Kneph, 1884–1900.
- Yarker, John. Two Lectures on High Grade Masonry. Liverpool: n.p., 1886.
- Yarker, John. The Code of Apex and the Sat Bhai, revised. London: n.p., 1886.
- Invictus [Robert H. Fryar?] and John Yarker, The Letters of Hargrave Jennings, Author of "The Rosicrucians," "Phallicism," &c., &c.: Forming the Unabridged Correspondence with the Editor of the Bath Occult Reprints, between 1879 and 1887, with Frontispiece. Bath: Robert H. Fryar, 1895.
- Thomas Inman and John Yarker, Supernatural Generation. Bath: R. H. Fryar, 1896.
- Yarker, John. "Aureus:" the Golden Tractate of Hermes Trismegistus: Concerning the Physical Secret of the Philosopher’s Stone: In Seven Sections: With an Introductory Essay by J. Yarker. Bath: Robert H. Fryar, 1886.
- Villars de Montfaucon and John Yarker, Sub-Mundanes: Or, the Elementaries of the Cabala, Being the History of Spirits. Bath: R. H. Fryar, 1886.
- Villars de Montfaucon and John Yarker, Continuation of the Comte De Gabalis, or New Discourses Upon the Secret Sciences; Touching upon the New Philosophy: Posthumous Work: Amsterdam, Pierre de Coup, M.D.CCXV. Bath: Robert H. Fryar, 1897.
- Antoine Androl and John Yarker, The Assistant Génies, and Irreconcileable Gnomes, or Continuation to the Comte de Gabalis. La Haye, M.DCC.XVIII. Bath: Robert H. Fryar, 1897.
- L. A. Cahagnet and John Yarker, Magnetic Magic. [Bath]: [Robert H. Fryar], 1898.
- Yarker, John. "Obituary of Dr. Karl Kellner," Ars Quatuor Coronatorum 1905, 18: 150.
- Yarker, John. The Arcane Schools: A Review of Their Origin and Antiquity; with a General History of Freemasonry and Its Relation to the Theosophic, Scientific, and Philosophic Mysteries. Belfast: W. Tait, 1909.
- Yarker, John. The Ancient Constitutional Charges of the Guild Free Masons: To Which Is Added a Comparison with York Freemasonry. Belfast: William Tait, 1909.
- Yarker, John. "The Apocalypse Unsealed" [review], The Equinox 1911, I(6): 164–7.
- Yarker, John. "The Secret Tradition in Freemasonry" [review], The Equinox 1912, I(7): 413–7.
