= List of Masonic rites =

Series of progressive degrees in Freemasonry

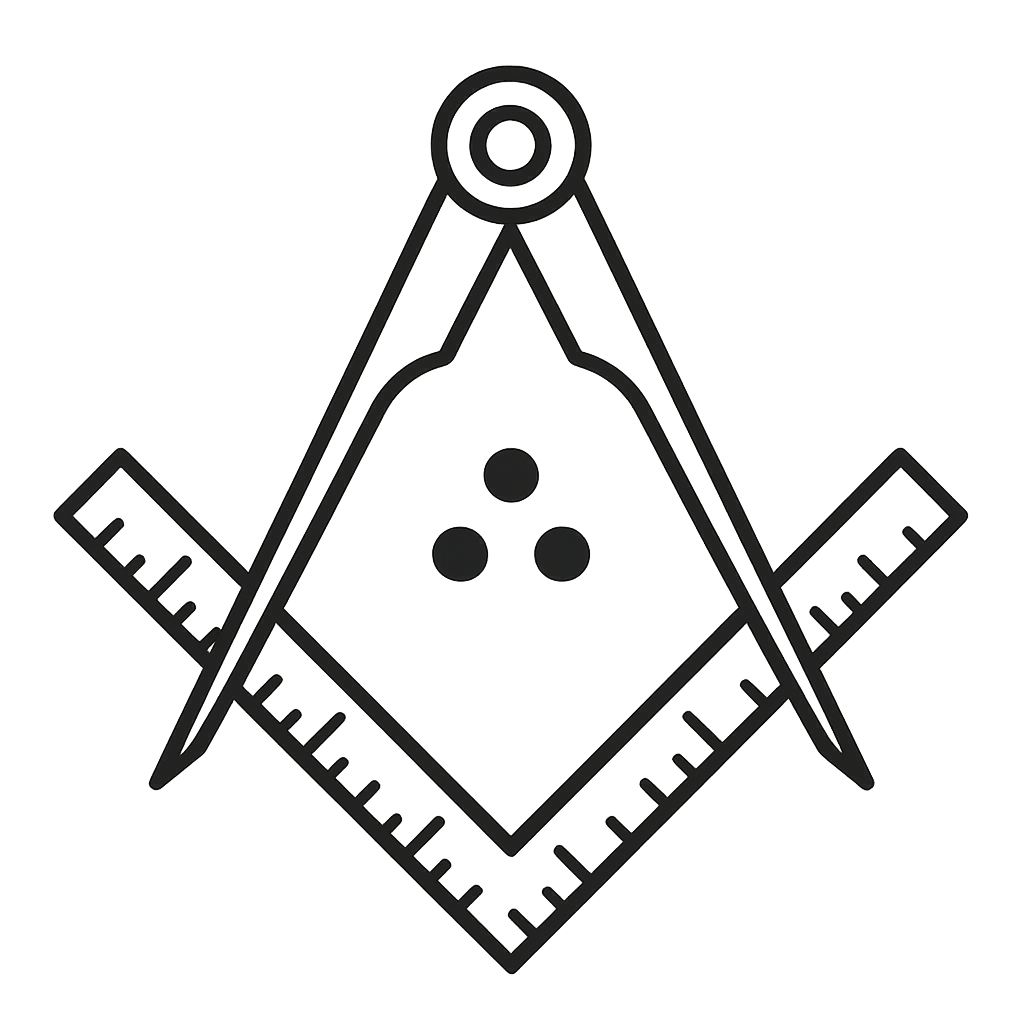
A square and compasses with the Masonic tripunctual abbreviation in its center, sometimes used in observant Freemasonry

A Rite, within the context of Freemasonry, is a comprehensive system of degrees that can initiate and advance a newcomer through various stages of Masonic knowledge and experience. In some cases, a Master Mason can be invited to join a different rite after having reached Mastery to further his knowledge. A rite must encompass the first three blue lodge craft degrees, either as degrees within the rite or as a prerequisite for joining the rite. Rites impart Masonic teachings and lessons throughout a Mason's journey.

== Authority and control ==
Masonic rites are usually under the control of Grand Lodges for the first three degrees then under the control of a concordant body for any upper degrees.

The most practiced rite in the world from the Entered Apprentice degree is the Ancient and Accepted Scottish Rite.

== Masonic rites ==
Some Masonic degree systems no longer exist, and others continue to be in use. In his 1861 book Tuileur Général De La Francmaçonnerie Ou Manuel De L'initié, Jean-Marie Ragon lists 52 Masonic Rites and over 1400 degrees.

=== Extant rites ===
Rite Name	Degrees	Notable Regions	Year Established	Notes
Adonhiramite Rite	13 (Traditional) / 33 (Modern)	Brazil, Portugal, Uruguay, France	1781	Originally 13 degrees ending with Noachite or Prussian Knight. In Brazil, it was later expanded to a 33-degree system. Has been worked in Brazil since the early 19th century.
Ancient and Accepted Scottish Rite	33	Worldwide	1801	Most widely practiced Masonic rite globally in the higher degrees.
Ancient and Primitive Rite	33	Multiple regions	1872	Formulated by John Yarker. A 33-degree reduction of the historic Egyptian-influenced Rite of Memphis.
Portuguese Rite	3	Portugal	1882	National rite of Portuguese Free-Masonry, primarily focused on the three symbolic degrees.
Brazilian Rite	33	Brazil	1914	Created by Lauro Sodré. It incorporates Brazilian national symbols, history, and civic duties into its philosophical lectures.
Irish Rite	3	Ireland, Worldwide		Traditional symbolic working of the Grand Lodge of Ireland.
French Rite (or Modern/Premiere Rite)	7	Worldwide	1725 (the ritual) 1783-1786 (Codified)	The French Rite is the principal rite of French Free-Masonry. Recognized as the oldest active rite practiced worldwide, it comprises three symbolic degrees and four higher philosophical orders. The ritual system is a direct descendant of the Premier Grand Lodge of England's rituals from 1717 (1724). The "Orders of Wisdom" constitute the capstone of the French Rite, representing one of the oldest, most refined, and historically significant systems of Masonic completion in the world. Membership in the Orders of Wisdom is strictly by invitation, offering philosophical instruction that is frequently characterized as profoundly transformative within Free-Masonry.
Moorish Rite	Multiple	United States	20th Century	Influenced by Moorish Science traditions; highly irregular and not recognized by mainstream Free-Masonry.
National Mexican Rite	9	Mexico	1825	National rite of Mexican Free-Masonry, historically tied to 19th-century political and social reform in Mexico.
Primitive Scottish Rite	33	Multiple regions	1770	Established at Namur by Marchot. Practiced by some Grand Lodges and worked exclusively by the Grande Loge Symbolique travaillant au Rite Écossais Primitif
Rectified Scottish Rite	6	Europe, North America, and South America.	1778	Christian-themed rite, focused on Knight Templar spiritual descendance and the doctrine of reintegration; always written as R.E.R. in English.
Standard Scottish Rite	3	Multiple regions (Prominent in France)	19th Century	Standardized version of ancient Scottish workings, historically codified in Scotland but highly popular in France.
Rite Français Moderne Rétabli	7	France	1955	Modern traditional restoration of the older forms of the French Rite, removing later secular revisions.
Rite of Baldwyn	7	Bristol, UK	circa 1780	Historic English rite unique to the Province of Bristol, comprising the Five Royal Orders.
Rite of Memphis	95	Multiple regions	1838	Also known as the Oriental Rite. Egyptian-influenced system founded by Jacques Étienne Marconis de Nègre.
Rite of Memphis-Misraïm	99	Multiple regions	1881	Combines the Memphis and Misraïm traditions into one Egyptian Free-Masonry system, largely credited to Giuseppe Garibaldi.
Rite of Misraïm	90	Multiple regions	1805	Egyptian-influenced rite established in Italy and France by the Bédarride brothers.
Rite Opératif de Salomon	9	Multiple regions	1974	Operative working focusing heavily on Solomonic traditions and esoteric builder symbolism, created in France.
Schröder Rite	3	Germany, Brazil, Multiple regions	1801	German system established by Friedrich Ludwig Schröder, focused purely on the three symbolic degrees with no higher degrees.
Swedish Rite	11	Sweden, Nordic Countries, Germany	1759	Official system of Swedish Free-Masonry. Strictly Christian and heavily influenced by Rosicrucian and Templar traditions.
York Rite	10	United States of America	1797 (Blue Lodge system), 1816 (Knights Templar), 1818-1819 (Cryptic Free-Masonry), 1880 (National Cryptic),	The American York Rite comprises three distinct, unified bodies: the Chapter, the Council, and the Commandery. Primarily practiced within the United States, the rite has almost no direct historical connection to the physical city of York, England. The nomenclature was strategically adopted to claim antiquity by referencing the traditional Masonic legend of Prince Edwin, who purportedly convened the first General Assembly of Free-Masons in York in the year 926. This branding successfully differentiated the system from the Scottish Rite, which similarly lacks Scottish origins. Ultimately, the contemporary system is a distinctively American innovation, formally codified by Thomas Smith Webb then expended during the early American Republic to establish a cohesive, national identity for Free-Masonry.
Élus Coëns / Martinism Rite	11 (Coën) / 3-4 (Martinism)	Multiple regions	1767 (Coën)	Esoteric Christian system. The original Élus Coëns required Free-Masonry, while modern Martinism is a parallel, independent tradition.
Pennsylvania Work (Ancient York Masonry)	3	Pennsylvania, USA	1786	Only U.S. state not practicing the Preston-Webb Ritual. Preserves older "Antients" Grand Lodge workings.
Philosophical Scottish Rite	12	Belgium, France	1776	Established at the Contrat Social Lodge in Paris. Still actively practiced in Belgium.
Eclectic Rite	3	Germany, Switzerland, Uruguay, Brazil	1783	Formed in Frankfurt. Focuses exclusively on the Blue Lodge degrees to strip away higher-degree occultism.
Philosophical French Rite	3	France	1969–2002	Created within Tolérance lodge of Grand Orient de France. Covers three symbolic degrees (Apprentice, Fellowcraft, Master).

=== No longer practiced ===
Rite Name	Degrees	Year Established	Notes
Ancient Reformed rite	-	-	
Rite of Adoption	-	-	
Rite of Strict Observance	7	1751	dissolved in 1782.
Cagliostro Adoption Rite	-	-	
Rite of the Knights of the Two Eagles	-	-	
Amicists Rite	-	-	
African Architect Rite	-	1767	
Rite of the Chapter of Clermont	-	1754	
Chaldean Rite	3	-	
Fesster Rite	9	1765	
Clerks of the Relaxed Observance Rite	10	-	
Rite of Brother Henoch	4	-	
Indian Rite	3	-	
Chastannier Rite	-	1767	Benedict
Rite of the Negotiates	3	1780	Pythagorean masonic rite
Rite of the Benevolent Knights	-	-	Of the Holy City of Jerusalem
Brothers of the Rose-Croix	-	-	
Brotherhood of Moravian brothers	-	1739	Order of the mustard seed
English Conclave of Templar-Kadosh Rite	-	-	
Primitive Scottish Rite (Marchet)	33	-	From Advocate Marchet de Nivelles
Rite of Reformed Scots	-	1766	By Tschoudy
Rite of Reformed Scots of Saint-Martin	7	-	
Egyptian Rite (Cagliostro)	-	1782	
Rite of Elect Cőens	9	1754	Martinez Paschalis
Rite of the Elect of the Truth	14	1779	Three classes
Eons Rite	-	-	Zoroastrian Masonry
Rite of the Knights of the Polar Star	-	-	
Fessler Rite	9	1797	
Rite of the Brothers	-	-	
Order of Palladium	-	1737	subject of the Taxil hoax
Rite of the Black Brothers	-	-	
Rite of the perfect Egyptian initiates	7	-	Lyon France, Crota-Repoa
Rite of Universal Harmony	-	1782	
Rite of the Grand Lodge of the Three Globes	17	1740	Berlin
Zinnendorf Rite	7	1770	
Heredom Rite	25	1758	Also known as Perfection
Rite of the Invisibles	-	-	
Rose Croix Rectified of Schroeder	7	1766	
Hermetic Rite of Avignon	-	-	
Rite of Liberty	-	1740	Founded in Paris
Rite of the Decorated Masters	-	-	Strict Observance
French Noahides Rite	-	-	Napoleonic Masonry
Rite of the Templar Orient	-	-	
Haitian rite	3	-	Blue Lodge
Rite of the Land of Palestine	-	-	
Pernetty Rite	-	1760	Also known as Enlightened of Avignon
Persian Philosophical Rite	7	-	
Philalethes Rite	12	1773	Seekers of Truth
Rite Primitif de Narbonne	3	1779	Rite of the Primitive Philadelphians
Schroepffer Rite	-	-	Magic, evocations
Sophisians Rite	7	1801	
Rite of Swedenborg	8	-	Illuminated of Stockholm
Rite de la Vieille Bru	9	1748	Faithful Scotchman from Toulouse
Rite of the Disciples of Hermes	-	-	-
Manichaean Brothers Rite	-	-	-
Pantheists Rite	-	-	Also known as Socratic Lodge
Rite of the Knights of the Pure Truth	-	-	
Xerophagists Rite	-	-	-
Rite of the Illuminated Zodiac	-	-	

== Masonic Orders ==
Order Name	Year Established	Notes
Ordre Initiatique et Traditionnel de l'Art Royal	1973	Still active in 2024, Traditionalist Order, Practices the Rite Opératif de Salomon
Order of the Apocalypse	-	-
Order of Noachites	1757	M. de St. Gelaire
Knight of the Holy City Order	-	-
Architects of Africa	-	Also known as African Brotherhood or Chaos Order
Order of the Eagles and the Sun	-	-
Assanites Order	-	The Old Man of the Mountain
Order of Cuchiara	1512	Italy, also known as Trowel Order
Bonze Order	-	-
Cauldron Order	1512	Italy
Charles XIII Order	-	Bernadotte, King of Sweden
Knights of Asia Order	-	Initiated Brothers in 5 degrees
Scandinavian Order	-	-
Adepts Order	-	-
Knights of the Desert Order	-	-
Diamond Order	17th century	Invulnerable Knights
Awakened Order	18th century	-
Moravian Brothers Order	-	The Mustard Seed
Grand Duke Order	-	-
Lanturlus Order	1771	Instituted by Marquis de Croismarc
Hassanites Order	-	The Old Man of the Mountain
Illustrious Neapolitan Grand Masters Order	-	-
Magicians Order	18th century	-
Masters of 1804	1804	Political masonic Order
Palladium Order	18th century	Sovereign Council of Wisdom
Perfect Initiates of Asia Order	-	-
Unknown Philosophers Order	-	In 2 points
Sacred Sophisiros Order	-	-
Saint-Joachim Order	1760	Christian Freemasonry
Seven Sages Order	17th century	Companions of Ulysses
Tobacological Order	18th century	Also known as Prizers

== Masonic Academies ==
Academy Name	Degrees	Location	Notes
Academy of the Rose	4	-	-
Russian-Swedish	-	-	Alchemical Masonry of Schroder
Academy of the Ancients	-	Warsaw	Also known as Academy of Secrets
Academy Areopagite	-	-	Of the Knights Kadosch
Academy of the Sublime Masters	-	-	Of the Luminous Ring
Academy of the True Masons	6	Paris	Established 1861

== Diffusion of Rites (Blue Lodge level) ==
=== Europe ===
==== France ====
Grand Lodge	Type	Rites Practiced	Notes
Grand Orient de France (GODF)	Oldest and largest French Grand Lodge	French Rite; Rectified Scottish Rite; Ancient and Accepted Scottish Rite; Ancient and Primitive Rite of Memphis-Misraïm; Philosophical French Rite	-
Grande Loge de France (GLDF)	Second largest Grand Lodge	Ancient and Accepted Scottish Rite	-
Grande Loge Nationale Française (GLNF)	Third largest, only one in regularity with U.G.L.E.	French Rite; Rectified Scottish Rite; Ancient and Accepted Scottish Rite; Emulation Rite; York Rite; Standard Scottish Rite	-

==== Italy ====
Grand Lodge	Type	Rites Practiced	Notes
Grande Oriente d'Italia (GOI)	Oldest and largest Italian Grand Lodge	Ancient and Accepted Scottish Rite (AASR); French Rite (Modern Rite); York Rite; Egyptian Rite	-
Gran Loggia Regolare d'Italia (GLRI)	-	Emulation Rite	-
Serenissima Gran Loggia d'Italia (SGLI)	-	Ancient and Accepted Scottish Rite (AASR); York Rite	-
Gran Loggia d'Italia degli ALAM (GLdI)	-	Ancient and Primitive Rite of Memphis-Misraim; Ancient and Accepted Scottish Rite (AASR)	-

=== United States ===
State/Region	Grand Lodge	Blue Lodge Rites Practiced	Notes
General	Grand College of Rites	N/A	Focuses on collection and publication of texts from defunct masonic degrees and quasi-Masonic rituals.
Alabama	Grand Lodge of Alabama	York Rite (Preston/Webb)	Single ritual jurisdiction
Alaska	Grand Lodge of Alaska	York Rite (Preston/Webb)	Single ritual jurisdiction
Arizona	Grand Lodge of Arizona	York Rite (Preston/Webb)	Single ritual jurisdiction
Arkansas	Grand Lodge of Arkansas	York Rite (Preston/Webb)	Single ritual jurisdiction
California	Grand Lodge of California	York Rite (Preston/Webb); AASR (Craft Degrees)	Multiple ritual jurisdiction
Colorado	Grand Lodge of Colorado	York Rite (Preston/Webb)	Single ritual jurisdiction
Connecticut	Grand Lodge of Connecticut	York Rite (Preston/Webb)	Single ritual jurisdiction
Delaware	Grand Lodge of Delaware	York Rite (Preston/Webb)	Single ritual jurisdiction
District of Columbia	GLDC	Emulation Rite; Ancient and Accepted Scottish Rite (Craft Degrees); York Rite (Preston/Webb); French Rite (Premiere Rite); McBride Ritual; Rectified Sottish Rite (Craft degrees)	Most diverse ritual jurisdiction in the US
Florida	Grand Lodge of Florida	York Rite (Preston/Webb)	Single ritual jurisdiction
Georgia	Grand Lodge of Georgia	York Rite (Preston/Webb)	Single ritual jurisdiction
Hawaii	Grand Lodge of Hawaii	York Rite (Preston/Webb); AASR (Craft Degrees)	Multiple ritual jurisdiction
Idaho	Grand Lodge of Idaho	York Rite (Preston/Webb)	Single ritual jurisdiction
Illinois	Grand Lodge of Illinois	York Rite (Preston/Webb)	Single ritual jurisdiction
Indiana	Grand Lodge of Indiana	York Rite (Preston/Webb); Emulation Rite	Multiple ritual jurisdiction
Iowa	Grand Lodge of Iowa	York Rite (Preston/Webb)	Single ritual jurisdiction
Kansas	Grand Lodge of Kansas	York Rite (Preston/Webb)	Single ritual jurisdiction
Kentucky	Grand Lodge of Kentucky	York Rite (Preston/Webb)	Single ritual jurisdiction
Louisiana	Grand Lodge of Louisiana	York Rite (Preston/Webb); AASR (Craft Degrees)	Multiple ritual jurisdiction
Maine	Grand Lodge of Maine	York Rite (Preston/Webb)	Single ritual jurisdiction
Maryland	Grand Lodge of Maryland	York Rite (Preston/Webb)	Single ritual jurisdiction
Massachusetts	Grand Lodge of Massachusetts	York Rite (Preston/Webb)	Single ritual jurisdiction
Michigan	Grand Lodge of Michigan	York Rite (Preston/Webb)	Single ritual jurisdiction
Minnesota	Grand Lodge of Minnesota	York Rite (Preston/Webb)	Single ritual jurisdiction
Mississippi	Grand Lodge of Mississippi	York Rite (Preston/Webb)	Single ritual jurisdiction
Missouri	Grand Lodge of Missouri	York Rite (Preston/Webb)	Single ritual jurisdiction
Montana	Grand Lodge of Montana	York Rite (Preston/Webb)	Single ritual jurisdiction
Nebraska	Grand Lodge of Nebraska	York Rite (Preston/Webb)	Single ritual jurisdiction
Nevada	Grand Lodge of Nevada	York Rite (Preston/Webb)	Single ritual jurisdiction
New Hampshire	Grand Lodge of New Hampshire	York Rite (Preston/Webb)	Single ritual jurisdiction
New Jersey	Grand Lodge of New Jersey	York Rite (Preston/Webb)	Single ritual jurisdiction
New Mexico	Grand Lodge of New Mexico	York Rite (Preston/Webb)	Single ritual jurisdiction
New York	Grand Lodge of New York	York Rite (Preston/Webb); AASR (Craft Degrees)	Multiple ritual jurisdiction
North Carolina	Grand Lodge of North Carolina	York Rite (Preston/Webb)	Single ritual jurisdiction
North Dakota	Grand Lodge of North Dakota	York Rite (Preston/Webb)	Single ritual jurisdiction
Ohio	Grand Lodge of Ohio	York Rite (Preston/Webb); Emulation Rite	Goose and Gridiron Lodge No.1717 with special dispensation
Oklahoma	Grand Lodge of Oklahoma	York Rite (Preston/Webb)	Single ritual jurisdiction
Oregon	Grand Lodge of Oregon	York Rite (Preston/Webb)	Single ritual jurisdiction
Pennsylvania	Grand Lodge of Pennsylvania	Pennsylvania Rite	Unique version of the Ancient Ritual only practiced in Pennsylvania
Rhode Island	Grand Lodge of Rhode Island	York Rite (Preston/Webb)	Single ritual jurisdiction
South Carolina	Grand Lodge of South Carolina	York Rite (Preston/Webb)	Single ritual jurisdiction
South Dakota	Grand Lodge of South Dakota	York Rite (Preston/Webb)	Single ritual jurisdiction
Tennessee	Grand Lodge of Tennessee	York Rite (Preston/Webb)	Single ritual jurisdiction
Texas	Grand Lodge of Texas	York Rite (Preston/Webb)	Single ritual jurisdiction
Utah	Grand Lodge of Utah	York Rite (Preston/Webb)	Single ritual jurisdiction
Vermont	Grand Lodge of Vermont	York Rite (Preston/Webb)	Single ritual jurisdiction
Virginia	Grand Lodge of Virginia	York Rite (Preston/Webb)	Single ritual jurisdiction
Washington	Grand Lodge of Washington	York Rite (Preston/Webb)	Single ritual jurisdiction
West Virginia	Grand Lodge of West Virginia	York Rite (Preston/Webb)	Single ritual jurisdiction
Wisconsin	Grand Lodge of Wisconsin	York Rite (Preston/Webb); AASR (Craft Degrees)	Multiple ritual jurisdiction
Wyoming	Grand Lodge of Wyoming	York Rite (Preston/Webb)	Single ritual jurisdiction

Color Key:

- Red background indicates Single Ritual Jurisdiction
- Green background indicates Multiple Ritual Jurisdiction

Notes:

- All jurisdictions allow AASR and York Rite as upper degrees after the Blue Lodge level
- The Pennsylvania Rite is a unique variation of the Ancient Ritual
- The District of Columbia has the most diverse selection of approved rituals
- Special dispensations may exist in certain jurisdictions for specific lodges

== Masonic Rite Origins ==
Rite Name	Origin Location	Year Established	Original Purpose/Context
Ancient and Accepted Scottish Rite	Charleston, South Carolina/ France	1801	Evolved from Rite of Perfection
Rite of Memphis	France	-	Oriental and Egyptian traditions
Swedish Rite	Sweden	-	Christian-oriented Masonry
York Rite	England	-	Based on English craft traditions
French Rite	France	1724 (blue degrees) 1783(Codified)	Oldest Rite
Philosophical French Rite	France	1969-2002	Developed within Tolérance lodge
Pennsylvania Rite	Pennsylvania, USA	-	Derived from Ancient Grand Lodge of England
Rectified Scottish Rite	Lyon, France	-	Christian Rite

A key feature that distinguishes these rites is their relationship with the blue lodge degrees. Some rites incorporate these degrees directly, while others require them as prerequisites. The diversity of rites reflects the rich historical development of Freemasonry across different cultures and regions.

== See also ==
- Scottish Rite
- Chamber of Reflection
- Grand College of Rites
- Ancient and Primitive Rite
- French Rite
- National Mexican Rite
- Rectified Scottish Rite
- Rite of Baldwyn
- Masonic myths
