= York Rite =

Masonic body and degree system

In Anglo-American Freemasonry, York Rite, sometimes referred to as the American Rite, is one of several Rites of Freemasonry. It is named after York, in Yorkshire, where the Rite was supposedly first practiced.

A Rite is a series of progressive degrees that are conferred by various Masonic organizations or bodies, each of which operates under the control of its own central authority. The York Rite specifically is a collection of separate Masonic Bodies and associated Degrees that would otherwise operate independently. While the corresponding bodies and degrees are present worldwide, the term is primary used by American freemasons.

The three primary bodies in the York Rite are the Chapter of Royal Arch Masons, Council of Royal & Select Masters or Council of Cryptic Masons, and the Commandery of Knights Templar, each of which are governed independently but are all considered to be a part of the York Rite. There are also other organizations that are considered to be directly associated with the York Rite, or require York Rite membership to join such as the York Rite Sovereign College but in general the York Rite is considered to be made up of the aforementioned three. The Rite's name is derived from the city of York, where, according to one Masonic legend, the first meetings of Masons in England took place.

The York Rite is also one of the concordant bodies of Freemasonry that a Master Mason may join to further his knowledge of Freemasonry. But the York Rite is not found as a single system worldwide, and outside of the United States there are often significant differences in ritual, as well as organization. However, in most cases, provided that the Grand Body in question regards the parent "Craft" jurisdiction as regular, each distinct Order has recognized fraternal inter-relations with the respective Grand Body within the York system.

== York Rite bodies ==
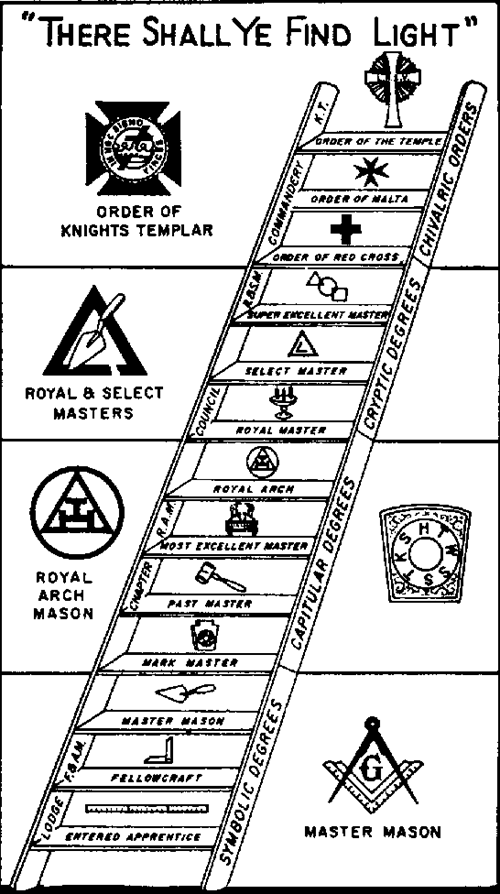
York Rite Degree Ladder

Since the York Rite is actually a grouping of separate organizations joined in order, each body operates with relative autonomy. And though they are referred to as one rite it is common for individuals to be member of some bodies and not others. For example, in many jurisdictions Cryptic Masonry can be skipped allowing the person to be a member of just the Royal Arch and Knights Templar. It is also common for non-Christians to join only the Royal Arch and Council of Royal & Select Masters, as the Knights Templar require members to be willing to defend the Christian faith, if needed. Membership in the Royal Arch is always required and must be kept in order to maintain membership in the other two bodies.

Details on the individual bodies are as follows:

=== Royal Arch Masonry ===
The Triple Tau. (Grand Emblem of Royal Arch Masonry)

Royal Arch Masonry is the first order a Master Mason joins in the York Rite. The Chapter works the following degrees:

- The Mark Master Mason degree is in some respects an extension of the Fellow Crafts' second degree. In some jurisdictions the degree is conferred in a Fellow Craft Lodge, that is, the second degree of the Blue Lodge.
- The (Virtual) Past Master degree is conferred because of the traditional requirement that only Past Masters of a Blue Lodge may be admitted to Holy Royal Arch. Because there are so many applicants for this degree, Virtual Past Master is required to qualify them for it in many U.S. jurisdictions. Other places, such as Pennsylvania and UGLE Masonry, do not have this requirement or procedure. Much of the work is the same given to install the Worshipful Master of a Blue Lodge.
- In the Most Excellent Master degree the building of King Solomon's Temple, which figures so prominently in Blue Lodge, has been completed. In England the degree is conferred by the Order of Royal and Select Masters, along with three other degrees.
- The Royal Arch Mason (or Holy Royal Arch) degree is said by many to be the most beautiful degree in all of Freemasonry. Following a convocation of the Supreme Grand Chapter in England on November 10, 2004, there are currently significant ritual differences between what is worked in England and that worked in many U.S. jurisdictions. Fraternal inter-relations remain as before. Freemasons who reach this degree may continue to Cryptic Masonry or go straight to Knights Templar where permitted—requirements vary in different jurisdictions.

=== Cryptic Masonry ===
One variation of the Royal & Select Masters' Emblem, of which there are many.

Membership in the Council of Royal & Select Masters or the Council of Cryptic Masons is not required for membership in the Knights Templar in some jurisdictions, so it can be skipped. In others it is required. It is called Cryptic Masonry or the Cryptic Rite because a crypt or underground room figures prominently in the legends told in the degrees.

- Royal Master
- Select Master
- Super Excellent Master

In some jurisdictions, a Most Excellent Master degree is offered between Select Master and Super Excellent Master, while other jurisdictions do not have the Super Excellent Master degree.

=== Knights Templar (Grand Encampment of Knights Templar of the U.S.A.) ===
A crowned Passion Cross laid upon the Cross pattée inscribed with "In Hoc Signo Vinces" resting upon crossed swords is often used in to represent the Knights Templar

The Knights Templar is the final order joined in the York Rite. Unlike other Masonic bodies which only require a belief in a Supreme Being regardless of religion, membership in the Knights Templar is open only to Christian Masons who have completed their Royal Arch and in some jurisdictions their Cryptic Degrees. This body is modeled on the historical Knights Templar to carry on the spirit of their organization. Throughout history it has been claimed that Freemasonry itself was founded by the Knights Templar or that the Knights Templar took refuge in Freemasonry after their persecution. The Grand Encampment of the United States acknowledges the existence of these theories but states that there is no proof to justify such claims.

A local Knights Templar division is called a Commandery and operates under a state level Grand Commandery as well as The Grand Encampment of the United States. This is unique among Masonic bodies as most report to the state level alone. The Knights Templar confer three orders, and one passing order as opposed to the standard degree system found elsewhere in Freemasonry:

- The Illustrious Order of the Red Cross
- The Passing Order of St. Paul (or the Mediterranean Pass)
- The Order of the Knights of Malta (or simply Order of Malta)
- The Order of the Temple

=== Honorary Bodies ===
In addition to the Capitular Degrees, Cryptic Degrees, and Chivalric Orders, there are several Honorary Bodies (sometimes called Invitational Bodies) that are associated with the York Rite and for which membership in a Royal Arch Chapter is requisite. Membership is by invitation only and usually only extended to those who have contributed in some significant way to the York Rite. They consist of:

- Allied Masonic Degrees
- Order of Knight Masons
- Order of Saint Thomas of Acon
- York Rite Sovereign College
- Knights of the York Rite Cross of Honor
- Holy Royal Arch Knight Templar Priests
- Red Cross of Constantine

== Equivalent independent bodies ==
=== Mark Master ===
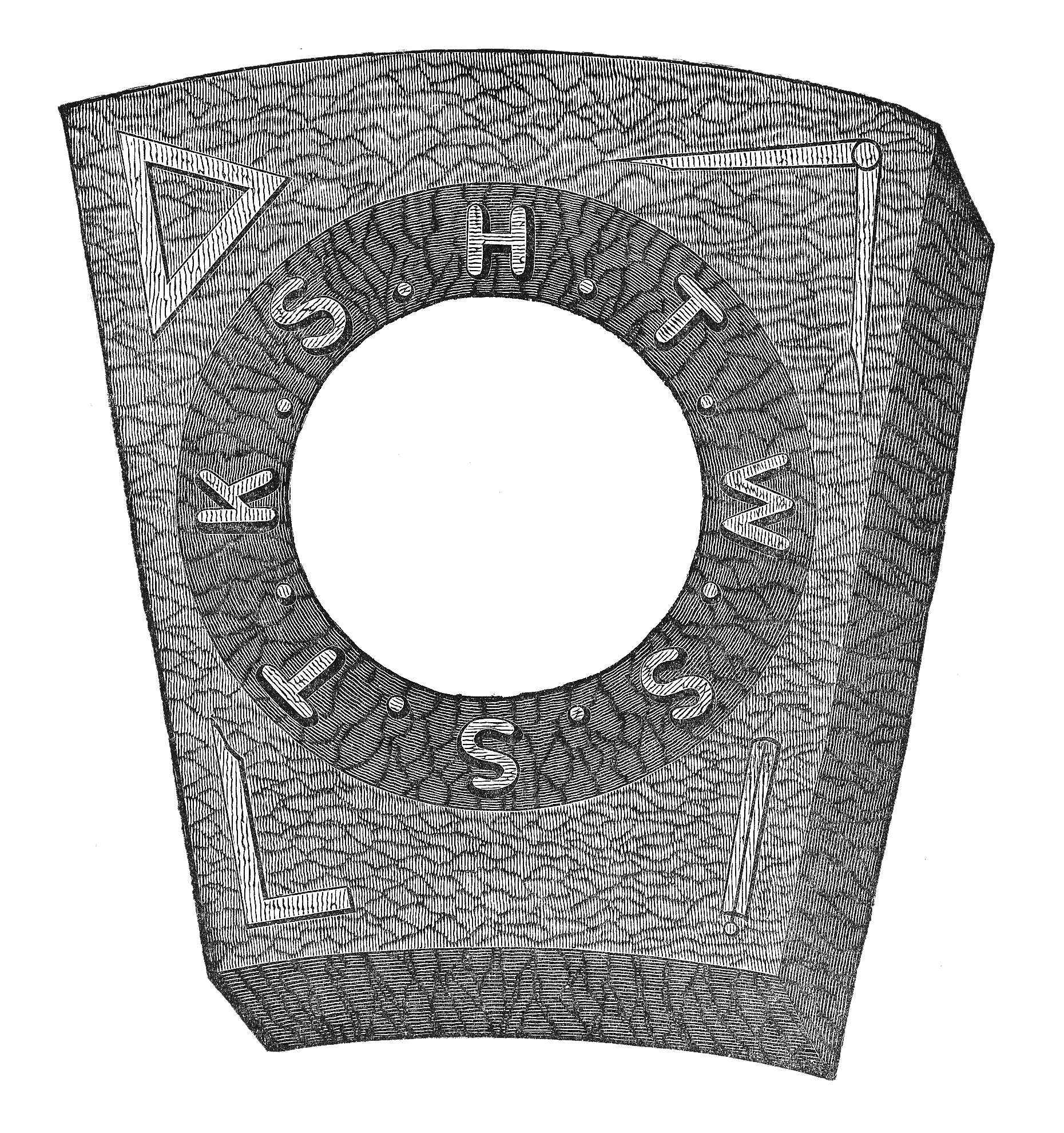
The keystone, the symbol of a Mark Master Mason.

- England, India, and parts of Europe and Australasia – The Mark degree is conferred in a separately warranted Lodge of Mark Master Masons. The candidate for Advancement is required to be a Master Mason. A further degree may conferred; one not present in the York Rite, that of Royal Ark Mariner; although strictly speaking this degree is conferred in a Lodge of Royal Ark Mariners – said lodge being 'anchored' or 'moored' to the parent Mark Lodge. In the U.S., this degree forms part of the Allied Masonic Degrees. In Canada, the Royal Ark Mariner degree is conferred by a Council of Royal and Select Masters.
- Scotland – The Mark degree is conferred in a Craft lodge and is seen as the completion of the Fellow Craft Degree, but the candidate for Advancement is required to be a Master Mason. The Mark may alternatively, and exceptionally, be conferred in a Holy Royal Arch Chapter as a prerequisite for Exaltation to the HRA. If a Candidate has already received his Mark Degree in his Craft Lodge, then his initiation into the Chapter is preceded by a short ceremony of Affiliation to the Mark Lodge associated ("moored") to that Chapter.

=== Royal and Select Masters ===
In England and Wales, the degrees of Select Master, Royal Master, Most Excellent Master and Super-Excellent Master are conferred in a separately warranted organization, the Order of Royal and Select Masters.

=== Royal Arch ===
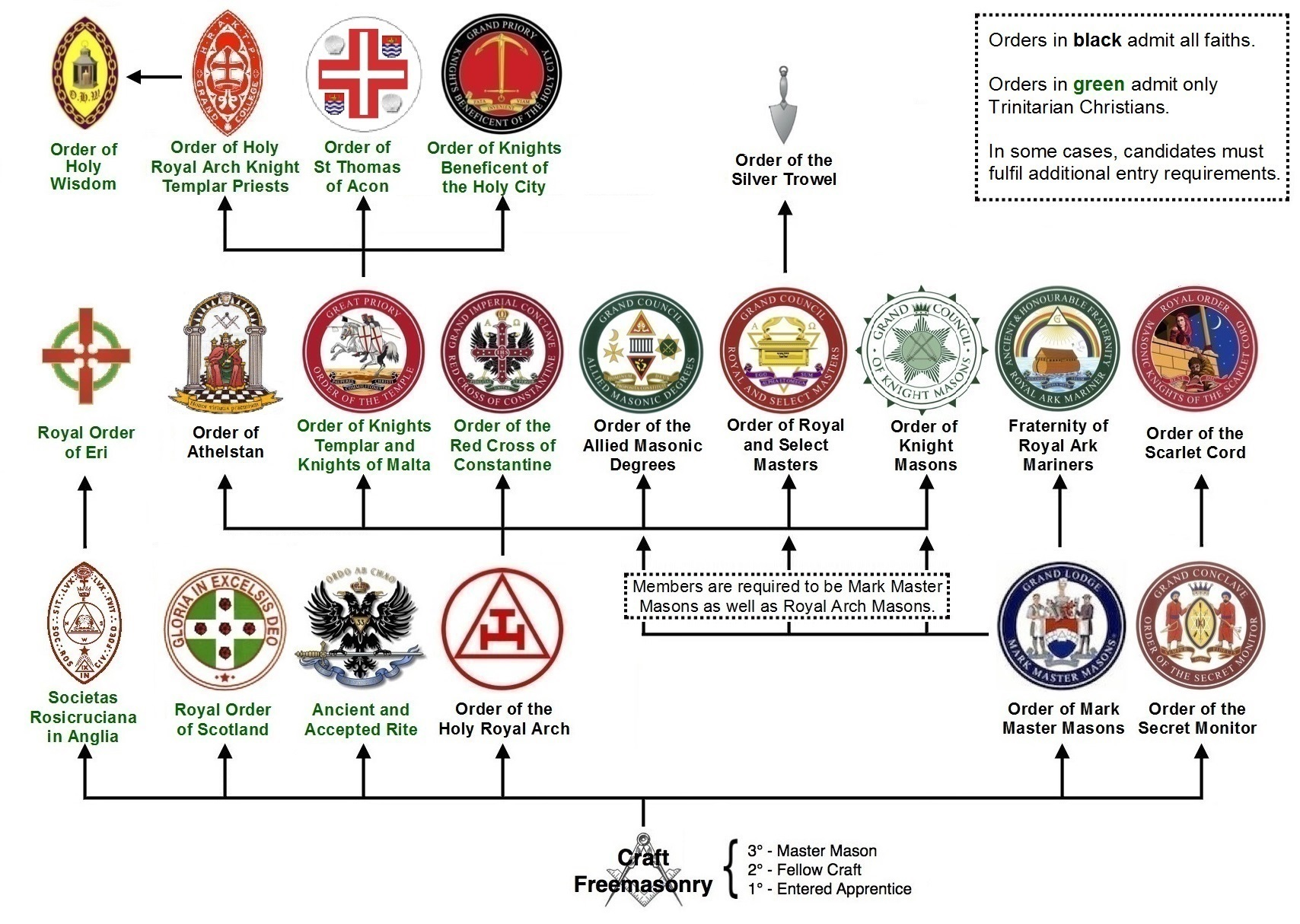
The position of the Royal Arch among the Masonic appendant bodies in England and Wales

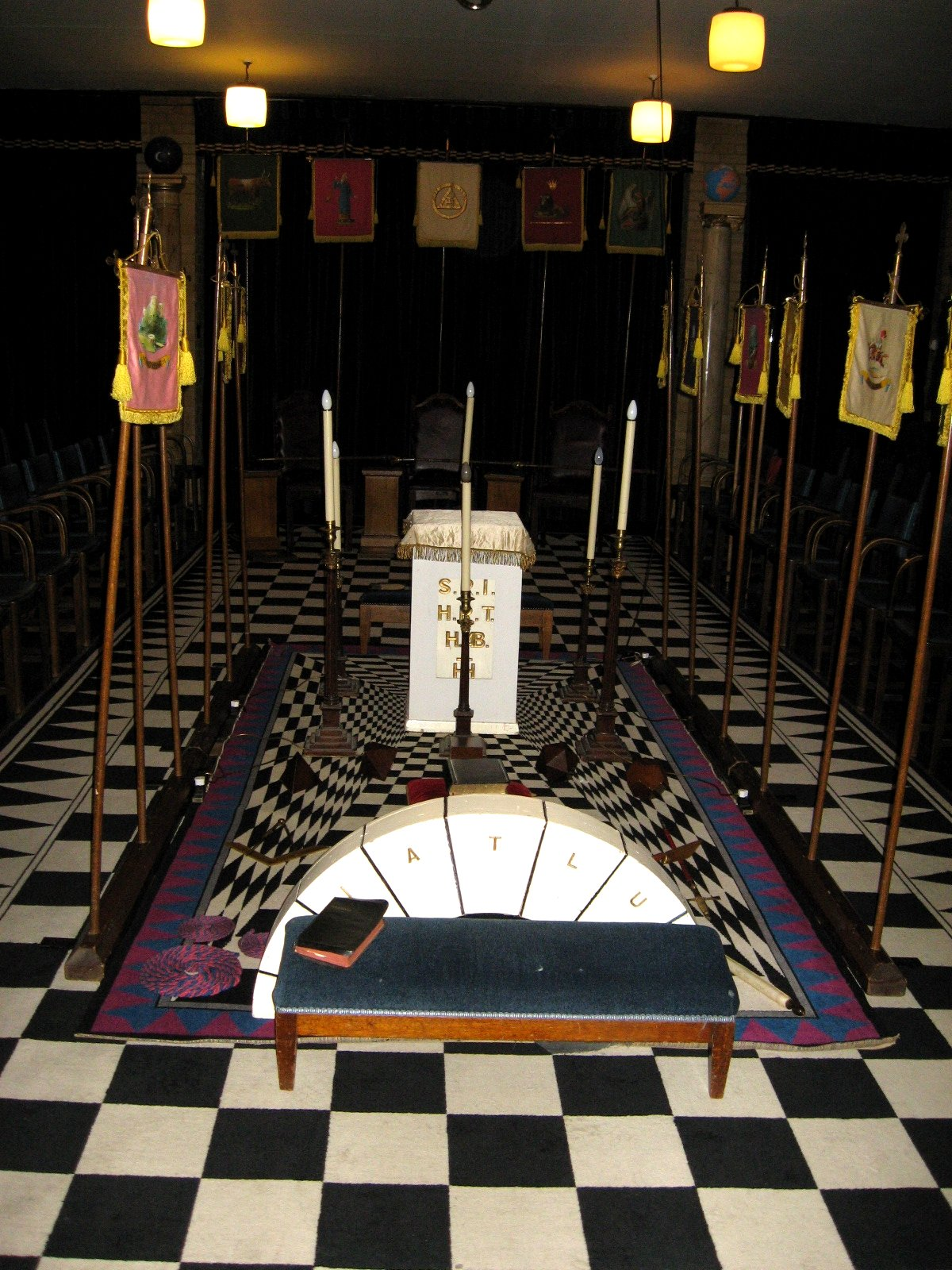
A lodge room set out for use by a Royal Arch Chapter

The Royal Arch is affiliated with various constitutions worldwide, many of which place different emphasis on the order.

- England, Europe and Australasia – A Royal Arch Chapter is required to be sponsored by a Craft Lodge and bears the same number, and in almost all cases the same name; however, the HRA is a separate Order from Craft Freemasonry. Supreme Grand Chapter is governed from the headquarters of the United Grand Lodge of England, but the administration remains distinct – though many officers of the Grand Lodge hold the equivalent office in the Grand Chapter. In these countries the Order of the Royal Arch consists of a single 'Royal Arch' degree, although there are three related ceremonies, one for the installation into each of the three Principals' chairs. As a compromise, at the union of two rival Grand Lodges in 1813, one of which considered the Royal Arch a 'Fourth Degree', whilst the other almost totally ignored it. English Freemasonry recognized the Royal Arch as part of "pure, ancient masonry," but stated that it was not an additional degree, but merely the "completion of the third degree." However, this was a compromise position, and one which was in opposition to normal masonic practice, and consequently on November 10, 2004, after much deliberation by a special working party, the Grand Chapter overturned this compromise position at its regular meeting in London, and declared the Royal Arch to be a separate degree in its own right, albeit the natural progression from the third degree. Words in the ritual which propounded the earlier compromise position were removed, by mandatory regulation.
- Ireland – The Royal Arch degree under the Irish Constitution is unique, and while it is regular and recognized, it bears little resemblance to the same degree in the sister Constitutions of England and Scotland. The Royal Arch Degree under the Irish Constitution contains a legend concerning the first Temple, not the second. The elaborate "Passing of the Veils" ceremony is essential to the Royal Arch Degree in the Irish system and after it is completed it is followed immediately by the Royal Arch degree itself, containing the story of the restoration of Solomon's Temple under King Josiah. The three presiding officers of a Royal Arch Chapter are called the Excellent King, High Priest and Chief Scribe, instead of First, Second and Third Principal. Irish Royal Arch Chapters are also permitted to meet as Lodges of Mark Master Masons, and they are governed by the Supreme Grand Royal Arch Chapter of Ireland.
- Scotland – The degree is conferred in a Royal Arch Chapter which is within a wholly different administrative structure, the Supreme Grand Chapter of Scotland. Due to a difference in ritual, Royal Arch Masons exalted in England may not attend Scottish Royal Arch Chapters without completing the Scottish exaltation ceremony. Before receiving the Royal Arch Degree the Candidate must first have the Mark degree and the degree of Excellent Master. However, those Exalted in Scotland may attend Chapter in England, or indeed any Chapter, provided it be in Amity.

=== Knights Templar ===
==== England and Wales ====
The Cross pattée, a symbol commonly associated with both the historic and modern Knights Templar.

Officially known as The United Religious, Military and Masonic Orders of the Temple and of St John of Jerusalem, Palestine, Rhodes and Malta, of England and Wales, this order is colloquially known as the Knights Templar. Local bodies of Knights Templar are known as Preceptories; local bodies of Knights of St Paul are known as Chapters; local bodies of Knights of Malta are known as Priories; all operate under a Grand or Great Priory, often with an intermediate level of Provincial Priories. Although some jurisdictions maintain a separate Great Priory of the Temple and Great Priory of Malta, as, for example, in England, the Grand Master and other officers of both Great Priories hold simultaneous equal office in both bodies. Three degrees are administered in this system:

- The Degree of Knight Templar (Order of the Temple)
- The Degree of Knight of St. Paul (incorporating the Mediterranean Pass)
- The Degree of Knight of Malta (Order of Malta)

Membership is by invitation and candidates are required to be Master Masons, holders of the degree of the Holy Royal Arch and to sign a declaration that they profess the Doctrine of the Holy and Undivided Trinity.

== See also ==
- French Rite - The Oldest Masonic Rite in three degrees and four Orders known as the Orders of Wisdom.
- Scottish Rite – Rite of Freemasonry
- Rite of Baldwyn – Rite of Freemasonry - A rite of seven degrees, practiced only in Bristol, UK.
- List of Masonic Rites – Series of progressive degrees in Freemasonry
- Masonic bodies – Auxiliary organization of Freemasonry
