= Freemasons' Hall, Bristol =

Masonic temple in City of Bristol, England

Freemasons' Hall
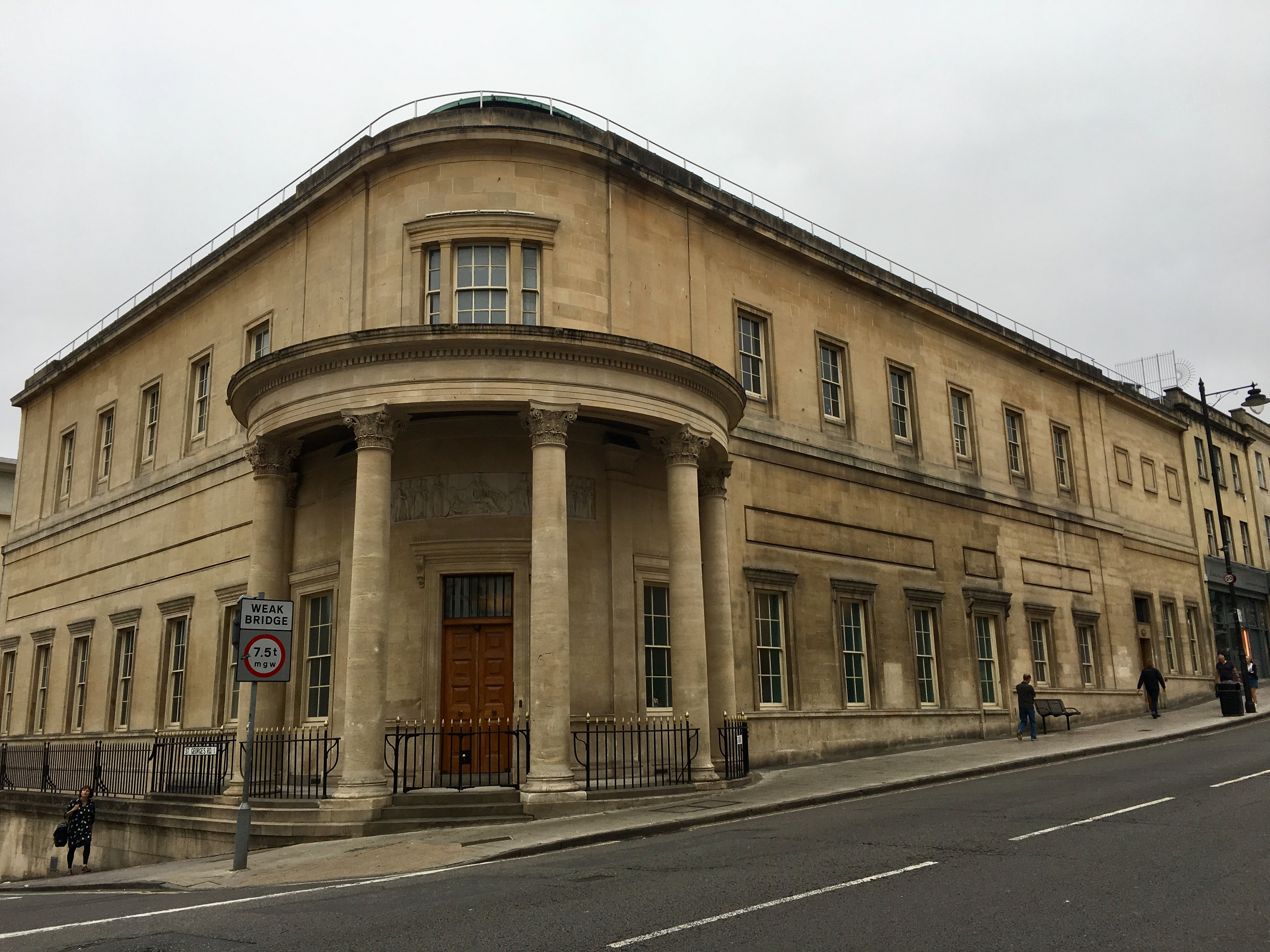
- Freemasons' Hall from the opposite side of Park Street

- Location within Bristol
- Alternative names: Masonic Hall

General information
- Location: Park Street, Bristol, England
- Coordinates: 51°27′13″N 2°36′08″W
- Year built: 1821

Website
- Official website

Listed Building – Grade II*
- Official name: Freemasons' Hall and attached cast iron railings
- Designated: 8 January 1959
- Reference no.: 1282205

Freemasons' Hall, Bristol, also known as the Masonic Hall, is a building on Park Street in the city of Bristol, England. It is a Grade II* listed building initially built in 1821. It is now the home of Freemasonry in Bristol and is the seat of the Provincial Grand Lodge of Bristol, as well as a number of other organisations and side orders including the Rite of Baldwyn. It is the home of 37 Craft Lodges, 15 Royal Arch Chapters, seven Mark Lodges, and three Royal Ark Lodges and is one of the few masonic provinces which enjoy all lodges meeting in the same building. The Bristol Masonic Society also meets there.

== History ==
The building was initially built as The Philosophical Institution for the Advancement of Science, Literature and Art, later becoming a museum. The Philosophical Institution was in operation from 1823 to 1871 and during that time merged with the Bristol Library Society, eventually moving site multiple times and becoming what is now Bristol City Museum. In 1871 it was purchased by the Freemasons of Bristol and converted for their use. It was bombed during the Second World War and burnt extensively. It was rebuilt after the war and reopened in 1955.

== The building ==
Built from limestone with a copper-clad roof, Freemasons' Hall is sited on the corner of Park Street and St George's Road in Bristol. The main entrance to the building is elevated behind cast iron railings with a gate and bud finials and is surmounted by a frieze depicting a classical Greek scene by EH Baily. This opens into a circular reception area which in turn leads to the lounge and main staircase of the building with access to all floors.

The building, also known as the Masonic Hall, contains a members-only bar, cloakrooms, meeting rooms, three dining rooms, a library, and a number of temples and chapter rooms.

Traditionally a building which has been closed to non-members, more recently Freemasons' Hall has been opened to the public as part of the Bristol Open Doors programme. This attracted new attention from the local press and was well received by curious locals. As an attempt to modernise and attract new members, journalists have been given tours of the building during Open Doors events and the visits filmed along with question and answer style sessions.

== Gallery ==
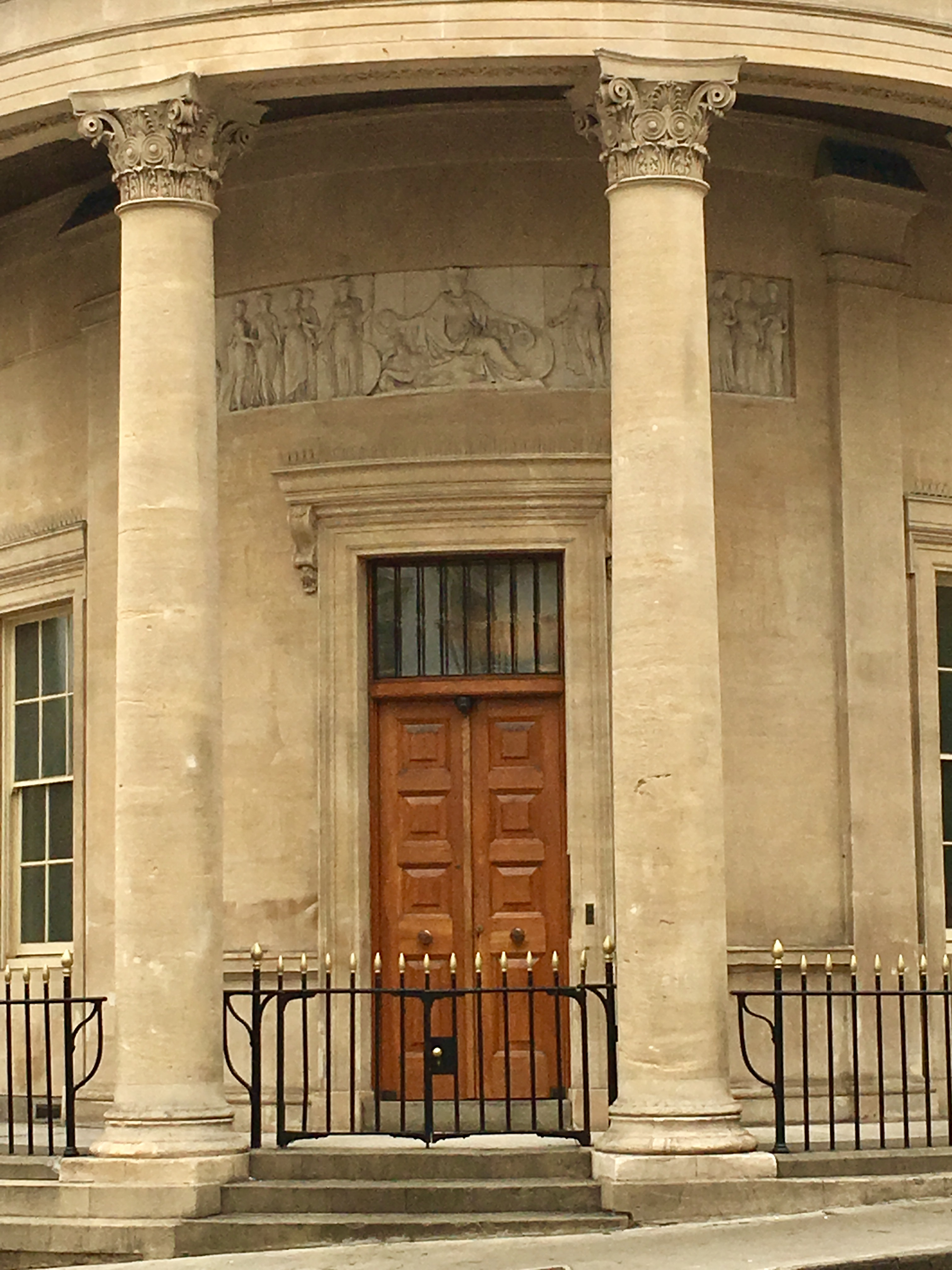
Detailed image of the main entrance including the railings

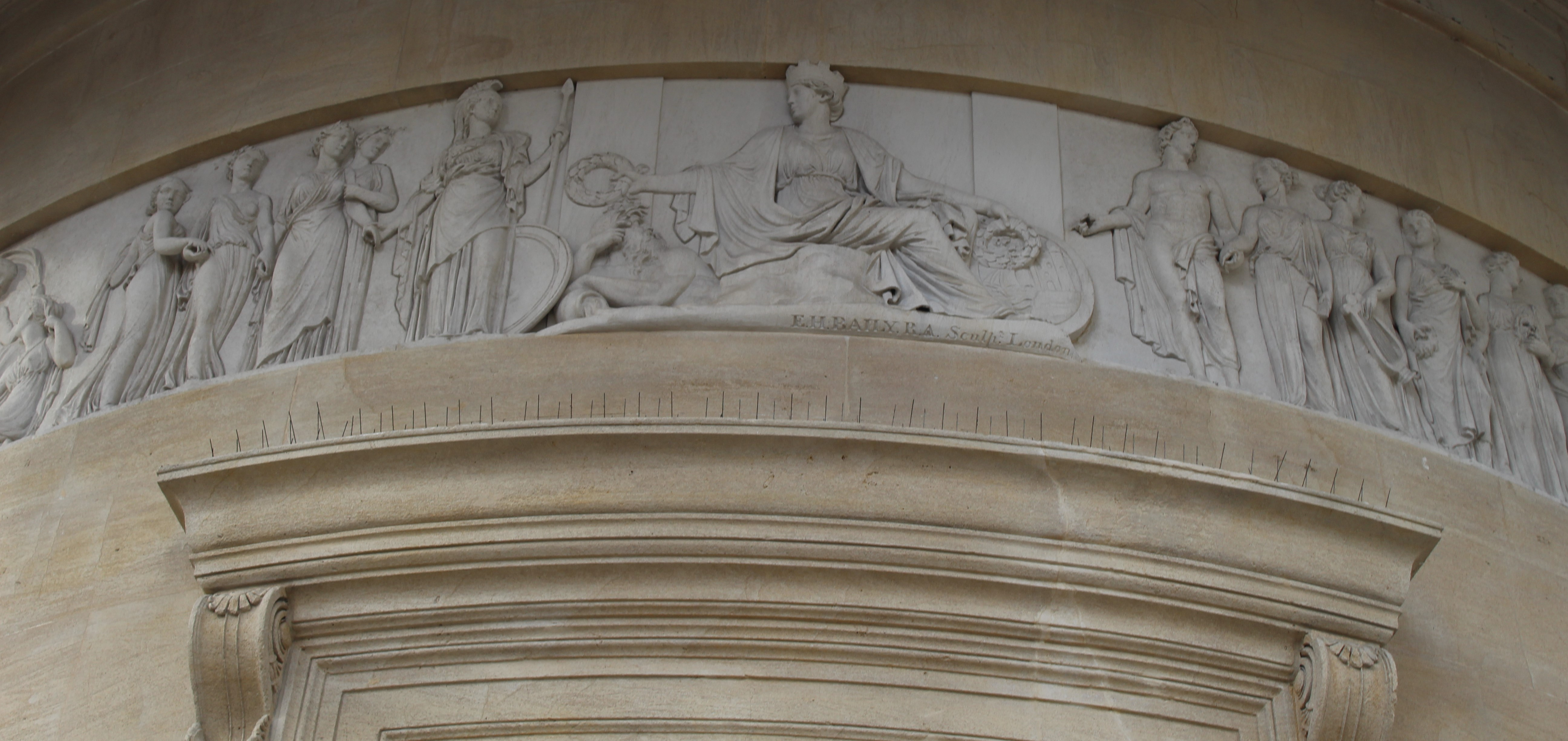
The frieze above the main entrance by EH Baily

== See also ==
- Grade II* listed buildings in Bristol
