= African Architect Rite =

Masonic rite

The African Architect Rite is a Masonic rite that is also known as the Rite of the African Brothers or the Crata Repoa Rite. It was established in 1767 in Prussia under the auspices of Frederick II the Great and is known for its distinctive structure and degrees.

== History ==
The African Architect Rite was founded in Prussia in the late 18th century. The Grand Master of the rite was Karl Friedrich von Koppen, who was a member of the Strict Templar Observance.

=== Prussian structure ===
In Prussia, the rite is organized into 7 classes, each with its own distinct characteristics and symbolism. These classes are as follows:

- 1st Pastophoris.
- 2nd Néocoris.
- 3rd Melanophoris.
- 4th Chistophoris.
- 5th Balahata.
- 6th Astronomer of the Gate of God.
- 7th Prophet or Saphenath Pancah.

=== French structure ===
In France, around 1770 or 1778, the structure of the rite expanded to include 11 degrees, guided by the teachings of "Frère Bailleul". These degrees are divided into two temples:

==== First Temple ====
The first temple consists of 3 blue degrees.

==== Second Temple ====
The second temple includes degrees from 4th to 8th, where members progress through various stages of knowledge and understanding. These degrees are:

- 4th - Architecte ou Apprenti des Secrets Egyptiens (Architect or Apprentice of Egyptian Secrets)
- 5th - Initié aux Secrets Egyptiens (Initiated into Egyptian Secrets)
- 6th - Frère Cosmopolite (Cosmopolitan Brother)
- 7th - Philosophe Chrétien (Christian Philosopher)
- 8th - Maître des Secrets Egyptiens (Master of Egyptian Secrets)

The rite also includes higher degrees beyond the second temple:

- 9th - Armiger
- 10th - Miles
- 11th - Eques

One of the significant aspects of the African Architect Rite is its symbolic content, especially in the third degree known as the "Porte de la Mort" (Gate of Death). In this degree, the symbolism revolves around the murder of a Master, often associated with Osiris, without resurrection. The candidate remains in darkness until the fourth degree (Chistophoris), where they receive the "bouclier d'Isis" (shield of Isis). The fifth degree (Balahate) features a representation of Horus killing Typhon, a symbolic representation that echoes the ancient Egyptian Triad of Osiris, Isis, and Horus.

The African Architect Rite's primary aim is to reveal the secrets of ancient Egypt, offering insights into the mysteries of this ancient civilization. Additionally, the rite provides a unique perspective on Alchemy, focusing on the art of decomposing substances and combining metals.

== See also ==
- Freemasonry
- Masonic Rites
