= Rite of Baldwyn =

Rite of Freemasonry

The Rite of Baldwyn or Rite of Seven Degrees is one of several Rites of Freemasonry. It exists and is only practised in the Masonic Province of Bristol, England in Freemason's Hall. A Rite is a series of progressive degrees that are conferred by various Masonic organizations or bodies, each of which operates under the control of its own central authority. The Rite of Baldwyn specifically is a collection of separate Masonic Bodies and associated Degrees that would otherwise operate independently. The three primary bodies in the York Rite are the degrees of Craft Freemasonry, the Supreme Order of the Holy Royal Arch, and the Camp of Baldwyn (also called The Five Royal Orders of Knighthood).

== Composition ==
Craft Freemasonry

- Iº − Craft Freemasonry
  - Entered Apprentice
  - Fellowcraft
  - Master Mason

Holy Royal Arch

- IIº − Supreme Order of the Holy Royal Arch

Camp of Baldwyn

- IIIº − Knights of the Nine Elected Masters
- IVº − The Ancient Order of Scots Knights Grand Architect
  - Order of Scots Knights Grand Architect
  - Order of Scots Knights of Kilwinning
- Vº − Knights of the East, the Sword and Eagle
- VIº − Knights of St John of Jerusalem, Palestine, Rhodes and Malta
  - Knights of St John of Jerusalem
  - Knights Templar
- VIIº − Knights of the Rose Croix of Mount Carmel

== History ==
One of the earliest records relating to the Baldwyn Rite is a Charter of Compact which was drawn up in 1780. In 1786 Thomas Dunckerley became Provincial Grand Master of Bristol and in 1791 also Grand Master of the Knights Templar. In 1843, the degree of 'Knight of the Rose Croix' was passed to the jurisdiction of the Supreme Council 33° for England, Wales and its Districts and Chapters Overseas, which governs the Ancient and Accepted Rite in England in Wales.

Another Charter of Compact was established in 1862, reading "Under the Banner of the Grand Conclave of Masonic Knights Templar of England and Wales" where it was agreed to give precedence to the Baldwyn Preceptory as a Provincial Grand Commandery with the powers to work all knighthood degrees of the Baldwyn Rite, including that of 'Knight Templar' and 'Knight of Malta'. The Ancient and Accepted Rite's claim to the Rose Croix degree was also disputed, and the Treaty of Union of 1881 ensured that the Rose Croix degree as practised in the Baldwyn Rite was recognized as independent.

== Teachings ==
The Rite of Baldwyn considers the craft degrees, as worked by the United Grand Lodge of England, to compose the first degree, and that the Bristol workings are the oldest in England. The Holy Royal Arch is considered to compose the second degree. The Royal Arch degree as worked in Bristol for the Baldwyn Rite is the only one in England to employ the ceremony of 'Passing the Veils'. This was historically employed throughout England and is still commonly found in many other jurisdictions. The Baldwyn Encampment works the IIIº to Vº under its own sovereign powers, and these degrees are peculiar to it alone. After the Vº, the candidate takes the Knight Templar and Knight of Malta degrees in a Baldwyn Preceptory which is under warrant from the Great Priory of England. They constitute the VIº of the Rite. The final degree, that of VIIº, is the Knight of the Rose Croix of Mount Carmel, which is worked in Bristol under warrant from the Supreme Council 33°. After the VIIº, the candidate is, in effect, a full member of the Baldwyn Rite.

== Organisation ==
The Grand Superintendent of the Rite of Baldwyn is, by virtue of his office, always the Provincial Prior of the Knights Templar in the Masonic Province of Bristol. Furthermore, the Camp of Baldwyn is treated as a District in itself for administrative purposes within the Ancient and Accepted Rite for England and Wales, and the Grand Superintendent is the Inspector General (i.e. presiding officer) for that District under the Rite (being automatically granted the 33° as such). Admission to the Rite of Baldwyn is by invitation only, and a candidate must have received the Holy Royal Arch degree in Bristol. Visiting Knights Rose Croix of the Ancient and Accepted Rite may attend a Baldwyn Rose Croix Chapter only if they are also Knights Templar, a requirement unknown outside Bristol. The rituals of the Bristol Rite are not copied and do not exist in published form. In December 2007, one of the degrees of the Bristol Rite was performed outside England for the first time ever. The Entered Apprentice degree was exemplified at the Grand Lodge of New York by members of Beaufort Lodge No. 103.

== Regalia ==
The Masonic regalia worn in the I°, II° and VI° of the Baldwyn Rite are generally the same as those worn by Craft Freemasons, Companions of the Holy Royal Arch and Knights Templar elsewhere. Members of the III°, IV°, V° and VII° wear a special breast jewel unique to the Baldwyn Rite, which comprises a Maltese Cross of silver, which is suspended from a black ribbon. Members of the VII° also wear a special apron with a pelican emblem, which used to be worn in the 18° of the Ancient and Accepted Rite but has been discontinued there.

== See also ==
- List of Masonic Rites
