= Ancient and Primitive Rite =

Masonic Rite

The Ancient and Primitive Rite, also called the Order of the Ancient and Primitive Rite of Memphis-Mizraim, is a Masonic Rite first popularized by John Yarker. It has been considered irregular by Masonic organisations such as the United Grand Lodge of England since at least 1860.

== History ==
John Yarker's Ancient and Primitive Rite grew out of the Rite of Memphis-Misraim, which itself was a combination, formed in 1881, of the Rite of Memphis and the Rite of Misraïm, both of which appeared in France at the beginning of the 19th century.

Yarker had been introduced to the Rite of Memphis in 1871 during a visit to New York,. As well as establishing the Ancient and Primitive Rite, Yarker would later become Deputy International Grand Master (1900) and International Grand Master (1902) of the Rite of Memphis-Misraim. He formed the Ancient and Primitive Rite with 33 degrees by eliminating duplicative degrees from the Rite of Memphis-Misraïm.

Yarker's Rite claimed a history going to Napoleon Bonaparte's armies in Egypt, and traced the development of the Rite until his present day. He professed also that "Its Rituals embrace all Masonry, and are based on those of the Craft universal; they explain its symbols, develope [sic] its mystic philosophy, exemplify its morality, examine its legends, tracing them to their primitive source, and dealing fairly and truthfully with the historical features of Symbolical Masonry. They contain nothing in their teaching but what Mahommedan, Christian, Jew, Buddhist, Brahmin, or Parsee may alike acknowledge." Until Yarker's death in 1913, there was never more than a total of 300 members.

== Degrees ==
The Rite of Memphis confers a set of degrees, numbered from 4° through 32°:

=== First Series: Chapter ===
==== Class I: Intro ====
- 1° – Entered Apprentice
- 2° – Companion
- 3° – Master Mason

==== Class II: College ====
- 4° – Discreet Master
- 5° – Sublime Master
- 6° – Knight of the Sacred Arch
- 7° – Knight of the Secret Vault

==== Class III: Chapter ====
- 8° – Knight of the Sword
- 9° – Knight of Jerusalem
- 10° – Knight of the Orient
- 11° – Knight of the Rose Croix

=== Second Series: Senate ===
==== Class IV: Senate ====
- 12° – Knight of the Red Eagle
- 13° – Knight of the Temple
- 14° – Knight of the Tabernacle
- 15° – Knight of the Serpent
- 16° – Knight Sage of Truth
- 17° – Knight Hermetic Philosopher

==== Class V: Areopagus ====
- 18° – Knight Kadosh
- 19° – Knight of the Royal Mystery
- 20° – Knight Grand Inspector

=== Third Series: Sublime Council ===
==== Class VI: Consistory ====
- 21° – Grand Installator
- 22° – Grand Consecrator
- 23° – Grand Eulogist
- 24° – Patriarch of Truth
- 25° – Patriarch of the Planispheres
- 26° – Patriarch of the Vedas

==== Class VII: Council ====
- 27° – Patriarch of Isis
- 28° – Patriarch of Memphis
- 29° – Pontiff of the Mystic City
- 30° – Perfect Pontiff, Sublime Master of the Great Work

=== Official ===
==== Grand Tribunal ====
- 31° – Grand Defender
- 32° – Prince of Memphis
- 33° – Grand Sovereign

== Bibliography ==
=== References ===
- Prescott, Andrew. The Cause of Humanity: Charles Bradlaugh and Freemasonry
- Boris Nicolaevsky, "Secret Societies and the First International," in The Revolutionary Internationals, 1864–1943, ed. Milored M. Drachkovitch (Stanford, 1966), 36–56.

== See also ==
- List of Masonic Rites
- Rite of Memphis-Misraim
