= Emulation Lodge of Improvement =

Masonic ritual

Emulation Lodge of Improvement is a Lodge of Instruction which first met on 2 October 1823, and is held under the sanction of Lodge of Unions No. 256 in the English Constitution. It restricts admission to Master Masons in good standing. The aim of the lodge is to preserve Masonic ritual as closely as is possible to that which was formally accepted by the newly formed United Grand Lodge of England in 1816 and as amended since.

== History ==
After the Union of 1813 (in December of that year) that formed the United Grand Lodge of England, it was necessary that the ritual be standardised, with approval of the Grand Lodges of Ireland and Scotland. A result of this was the International Compact, which governs relations between the three Grand Lodges.

== Emulation Ritual ==
The ritual to be used in United Grand Lodge of England and in Lodges under that constitution were produced by the Lodge of Reconciliation, formed following the union of the Antients and Moderns Grand Lodges in 1813, approved and confirmed by Grand Lodge in June 1816. This has formed the basis of Emulation Working since its inception in 1823. It has been the policy of the committee of the Emulation Lodge of Improvement to preserve the ritual as nearly as possible in the form in which it was approved by Grand Lodge, allowing only those changes approved by Grand Lodge to become established practice. The ritual, however, takes its name from the Emulation Lodge of Improvement, not the other way around.

The most notable changes were made in 1964, when an alternative form of reference to the ancient penalties was approved, and again in 1986 when a resolution from UGLE decreed that the so-called ‘blood oaths’, or symbolic penalties, were to be removed from the obligations taken by candidates for the three degrees or installation as a master.

== Lectures of the Craft ==
When the regular demonstrations of the "Lectures of the Craft" by the Grand Stewards' Lodge ceased in the 1860s, the Emulation Lodge of Improvement also became the leading body regularly working these. The Emulation Lodge of Improvement has demonstrated the system of Lectures in question and answer form continuously since 1823, although rehearsal of the Emulation Ritual has always been its main work.

== The silver matchbox ==
When a Brother acts as Master for any of the demonstrated ceremonies and delivers the work without need of prompt or correction, he is awarded an inscribed silver matchbox on the first occasion, with additional inscriptions added for each of the four Emulation ceremonies worked.
