= Masonic ritual and symbolism =

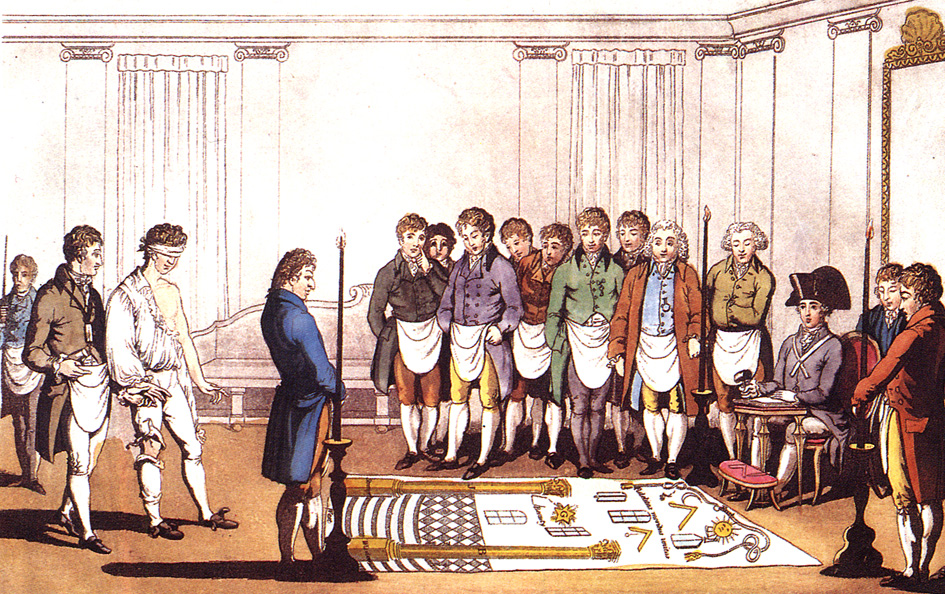
A masonic initiation. Paris, 1745.

Masonic ritual is the scripted words and actions that are spoken or performed during the degree work in a Masonic lodge. Masonic symbolism is that which is used to illustrate the principles which Freemasonry espouses. Masonic ritual has appeared in a number of contexts within literature (for example: "The Man Who Would Be King", by Rudyard Kipling, and War and Peace, by Leo Tolstoy).

== Purpose ==
Freemasonry has been described as a "Beautiful and profound system of morality, veiled in allegories and illustrated by symbols". The symbolism of Freemasonry is found throughout the Masonic lodge, and contains many of the working tools of a medieval or renaissance stonemason. The whole system is transmitted to initiates through the medium of Masonic ritual, which consists of lectures and allegorical plays.

Common to all of Freemasonry is the three grade system of Craft or Blue Lodge freemasonry, whose allegory is centred on the building of the Temple of Solomon, and the story of the chief architect, Hiram Abiff. Further degrees have different underlying allegories, often linked to the transmission of the story of Hiram. Participation in these is optional, and usually entails joining a separate Masonic body. The type and availability of the Higher Degrees also depends on the Masonic jurisdiction of the Craft lodge that first initiated the mason.

Broadly stated, two of the most common Masonic rites, which are groupings of rituals, are the Scottish Rite and the York Rite.

== Lack of standardisation ==
Freemasons conduct their degree work, often from memory, following a preset script and ritualised format. There are a variety of different Masonic rites for Craft Freemasonry. Each Masonic jurisdiction is free to standardize (or not standardize) its own ritual. However, there are similarities that exist among jurisdictions. For example, all Masonic rituals for the first three degrees use the architectural symbolism of the tools of the medieval operative stonemason. Freemasons, as speculative masons (meaning philosophical rather than actual building), use this symbolism to teach moral and ethical lessons, such as the four cardinal virtues of Fortitude, Prudence, Temperance, and Justice, and the principles of "Brotherly Love, Relief (or Morality), and Truth" (commonly found in English language rituals), or "Liberty, Equality, Fraternity" (commonly found in French rituals).

== Symbols in ritual ==
A Third Degree tracing board

In most jurisdictions, a Bible, Quran, Tanakh, Vedas or other appropriate sacred text (known in some rituals as the Volume of the Sacred Law) will always be displayed while the lodge is open (in some French and other Continental lodges, the Masonic Constitutions are used instead). In lodges with a membership of mixed religions it is common to find more than one sacred text displayed. A candidate will be given his choice of religious text for his Obligation, according to his beliefs. The United Grand Lodge of England (UGLE) alludes to similarities to legal practice in the UK, and to a common source with other oath taking processes.

The Obligations of Freemasonry are promises as to conduct. For example, the candidate swears to help those in need, to not defraud others, and to “keep the secrets of Freemasonry” (usually defined as the passwords and handshakes by which Masons recognize each other). These Obligations are among the oldest parts of the ritual, dating back to those sworn by operative stone masons in the Middle Ages. However, in recent years the penalties attached to the Obligations have come under criticism as being violent. In England the penalties were removed from Masonic obligations, while in the USA they are explained as being purely symbolic. Masonic obligations are not meant to cancel the legal or religious duty of the Mason.

In keeping with the geometrical and architectural theme of Freemasonry, the Supreme Being is referred to in Masonic ritual by the titles of the Great Architect of the Universe, Grand Geometrician or similar, to make clear that the reference is generic, and not tied to a particular religion's conception of God.

Some lodges make use of tracing boards: painted or printed illustrations depicting the various symbolic emblems of Freemasonry. They can be used as teaching aids during the lectures that follow each of the three degrees, when an experienced member explains the various concepts of Freemasonry to new members.

Solomon's Temple is a central symbol of Freemasonry which holds that the first three Grand Masters were King Solomon, King Hiram I of Tyre, and Hiram Abiff – the craftsman/architect who built the temple. Masonic initiation rites include the reenactment of a scene set on the Temple Mount while it was under construction. Every Masonic lodge, therefore, is symbolically the Temple for the duration of the degree and possesses ritual objects representing the architecture of the Temple. These may either be built into the hall or be portable. Among the most prominent are replicas of the pillars Boaz and Jachin through which every initiate has to pass.

== Fraternal modes of recognition ==
Historically, Freemasons used various signs (hand gestures), grips or "tokens" (handshakes), and passwords to identify legitimate Masonic visitors from non-Masons who might wish to gain admission to meetings. These signs, grips, and passwords have been exposed multiple times; today Freemasons use dues cards and other forms of written identification.

== Overlap with symbolism in the Church of Jesus Christ of Latter-day Saints ==
Worship in temples of the Church of Jesus Christ of Latter-day Saints shares a commonality of symbols and signs with Freemasonry. However, the meanings and purposes of each are very different for the Freemasons and the Latter-day Saints.

Speaking in 1877 at the St. George Temple, Brigham Young related LDS temple worship to the story of Hiram Abiff and Solomon's Temple, though he believed the ceremony had not been practiced in its fullness.

== Perceived secrecy of Masonic ritual ==
Freemasons often say that they "are not a secret society, but rather a society with secrets". The secrets of Freemasonry are the various modes of recognition – grips (handshakes), words (akin to modern passwords), and signs (hand gestures) that indicate one is a Freemason. While these and the rest of masonic ritual have all been exposed multiple times through the years, Freemasons continue to act as if they were secret, and promise not to discuss them with outsiders more out of tradition than a need for actual secrecy.

Over the years, a variety of exposures have been published which purport to represent Masonic ritual, including Masonry Dissected by Samuel Prichard in 1730, Three Distinct Knocks in 1760, Jachin and Boaz in 1762, and Morgan's Exposure of Freemasonry in 1826.

Nonetheless there is a perception of more extensive secrecy among non-Freemasons. This perception of secrecy has led to the creation of many Masonic conspiracy theories.

== See also ==
- Chamber of Reflection
- Grand College of Rites
- Church of St Edmund, Rochdale
- Observant Freemasonry
- List of Masonic rites

== Sources ==
- Goodwin, S.H. (1920), Mormonism and Masonry: Origins, Connections and Coincidences Between Mason and Mormon Temple/Templar Rituals
