= Rectified Scottish Rite =

Christian Masonic rite

The Rectified Scottish Rite (RER), also known as Order of Knights Beneficent of the Holy City or Knights Benefactor of the Holy City (Chevalier bienfaisant de la Cité sainte), is a Christian Masonic rite founded in Lyon (France) in 1778.

== Origins ==
The Rite was mainly elaborated by Jean-Baptiste Willermoz. This famous Mason reformed the French branch of the Rite of Strict Observance at the Congress of Gauls in 1778, including some items coming from the Elect Cohen Order and denying the Templar legacy. This date may be considered as the birth of the Rectified Scottish Rite. It came from several initiatory systems of the 18th century:

- The Order of Knight Masons of the Elect Cohens of the Universe, of Martines de Pasqually,
- The Templar Strict Observance, Knight Masonry born in Germany in the middle of the 18th century then spread in the rest of Europe,
- Scottish Masonry (all the existing higher degrees, when it was not yet structured),
- Craft Masonry in 3 degrees (entered apprentice, fellowcraft, master mason) as it was in use in French Freemasonry (Grand Orient de France) at this time and that became the French Rite. It might be noted that during this period, the Grand Orient of France was still in regularity and amity with English Freemasons, and there exists some evidence to suggest that English Masons, living in France, may have also introduced or practised some early ritual forms of degrees which are now constituted in the York Rite. In fact, many Grand Orient lodges practised at least the Mark Master and Royal Arch degrees, either as "side degrees" or as portions of the second and third craft degrees respectively. (UGLE Series Lecture, 22 OCT 1997) If these were present, they ceased to be included with historical Rectified Scottish Rite practices after the outbreak of the French Revolution in 1789, when the rite took its sojourn in Switzerland.

The evolution and transformation of this system during the 1778 (Lyon) and 1782 (Wilhelmsbad) congresses created the Rectified Scottish Rite in 1782.

Since then, rituals have remained the same, except the possible removal of the "York" influences just seven years later as mentioned above. It is a Christian rite which contains the doctrine of the Traité de la réintégration des êtres, Martines de Pasqually's major book.

== Organization ==
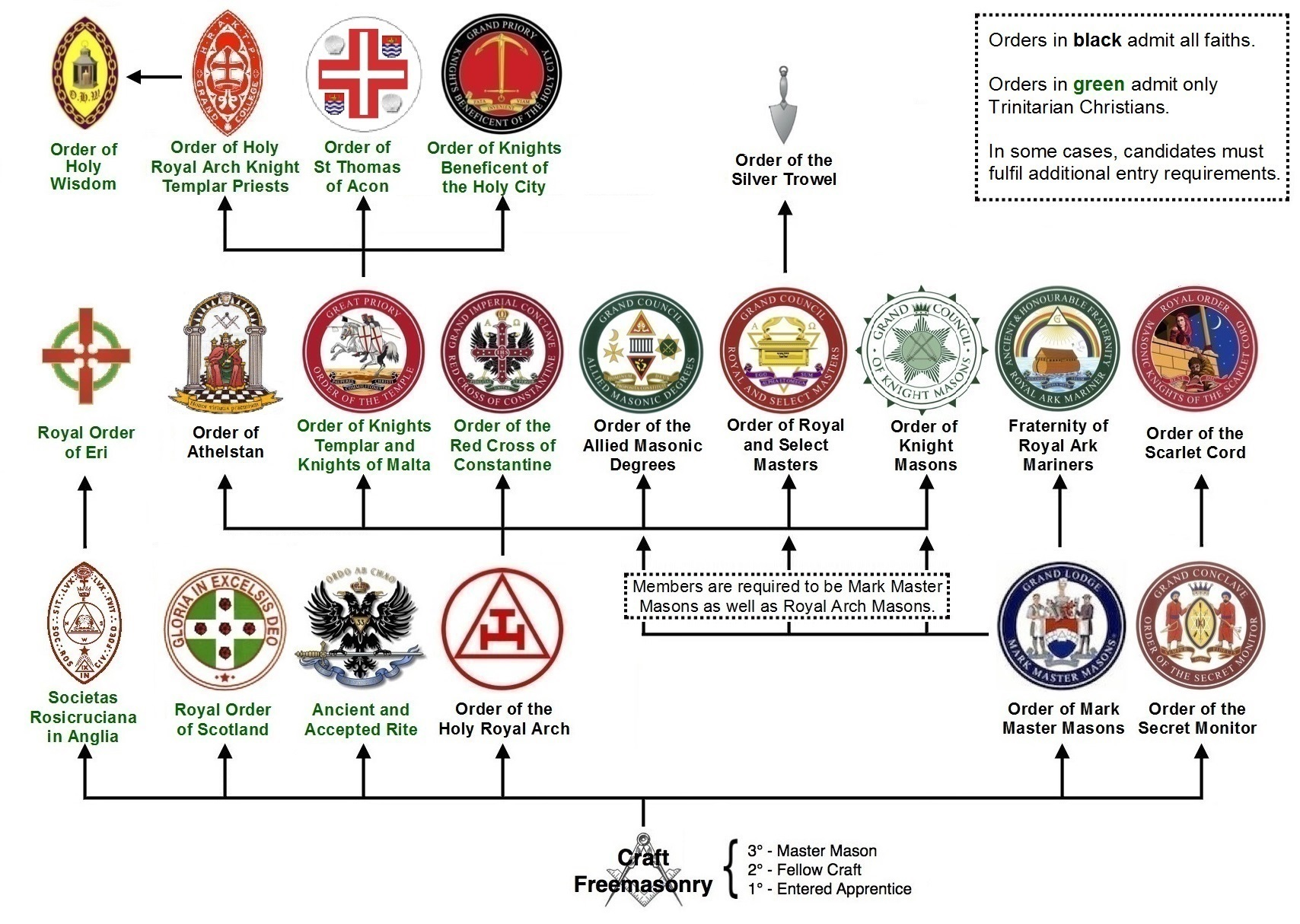
The position of the Order of Knights Beneficent of the Holy City among the Masonic appendant bodies in England and Wales

- Blue or Craft Lodges (lodges of St John)
  - Entered Apprentice
  - Fellow Craft
  - Master Mason
- Green Lodges (Lodges of St Andrew)
  - Scottish Master of St Andrew
- Inner Order
  - Squire Novice
  - Beneficent Knight of the Holy City (Chevalier Bienfaisant de la Cité Sainte) or CBCS, sometimes used as a short name for the rite
- Secret Class
  - Profes
  - Grand Profes

== The RER in the World ==
In England and Wales, the Rectified Scottish Rite is administered from Mark Masons' Hall, London.

== See also ==
- List of Masonic Rites
