= Freemasonry in France =

Free-Masonry in France (French: Franc-maçonnerie) has been influential on the worldwide Masonic movement due to its founding of Continental Freemasonry.

There are many and varied Masonic rites and obediences in France. The main male-only masonic organisations are the Grande Loge de France and the Grande Loge Nationale Française, the main female-only organisation is the Women's Grand Lodge Of France, and the main mixed organisations are now the Grand Orient de France and Le Droit Humain. In addition, organisations like the SRIA also operate in France, with colleges across the country.

== Historiography ==
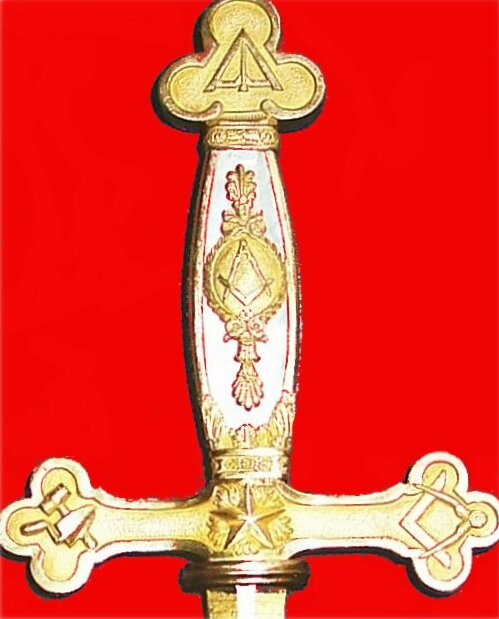
Masonic symbols (sword of Lafayette).

In the 18th century, Paris and Lyon were the two major centers of French Free-Masonry. Each of them hosted more than 20 lodges.

Until the mid-20th century, the history of Free-Masonry was excluded from classic-style history syllabi in universities. Particularly in France, Masonic historiography was thus almost entirely divided between authors who were vehemently pro- or anti-Free-Masonry (with the former often being masons themselves). Since then, Free-Masonry's political influence has diminished, and its historical conflict with France's Roman Catholic church (also now less politically powerful) has been if not resolved then at least appeased. This climate has been more favourable to the application of classic historical principles and methods to Masonic historiography, allowing it to develop and form a discipline of its own, "Masonology", devoted to a wider and more neutral study of the highly varied cultural and intellectual universe formed by European Free-Masonry in general and French Free-Masonry in particular.

French Free-Masonry offers the historian several documents (manuscripts, diplomas, engravings, caricatures, journal articles and other printed material) as well as a large number of objects relating to both ritual (Masonic aprons, tablets, vessels, medals) and everyday life (pipes, clocks, tobacco boxes and faience decorative art) that have been put on show in many museums and permanent exhibitions. However, the main sources in this area remain the manuscripts, especially the manuscripts cabinet at the Bibliothèque nationale de France and the municipal library of Lyon. In 2001, the Russian government repatriated (among other things) all the Masonic archives which had been confiscated by the Nazis during their occupation of Europe - these had been held at Moscow since 1945.

== Course ==
=== Ancien Régime ===
==== Origins ====
According to a tradition dating to 1777, the first Masonic lodge in France was founded in 1688 by the Royal Irish Regiment of Foot Guards, (later known as the Regiment of Walsh of the famed Irish Brigade of France) which followed James II of England into exile, under the name "La Parfaite Égalité" of Saint-Germain-en-Laye. Historians believe this to be probable, but it has never been proven conclusively. The same can be said of the first lodge of English origin, "Amitié et Fraternité", founded in 1721 at Dunkirk. The first lodge whose existence is historically certain was founded by some Englishmen in Paris "around the year 1725". It met at the house of the traiteur Huré on rue des Boucheries, "in the manner of English societies", and mainly brought together Irishmen and Jacobite exiles. It is quite probable that it was this lodge that in 1732 received official patents from the Grand Lodge of London under the lodge-name "Saint Thomas", meeting at the sign of the "Louis d'Argent", still on the rue des Boucheries.

In 1728, the Freemasons decided to recognise Philip Wharton, 1st Duke of Wharton (1698–1731) as "Grand Master of the Freemasons in France". Wharton lived in Paris and Lyon from 1728 to 1729, and had already been Grand Master of the Grand Lodge of London in 1723. His appointment as French Grand Master, which was before the transformation of the "Grand Lodge of London" into the "Grand Lodge of England in 1738", is considered by some historians to be the point of departure for French Free-Masonry and a declaration of its independence from British Free-Masonry. Wharton was succeeded as Grand Master of the French Freemasons by the Jacobites James Hector MacLean (1703–1750) and then Charles Radcliffe, Earl of Derwentwater (1693–1746).

While the existence of a Grand Master in France was attested to as early as 1728, it took another ten years for a true assembly of representatives from all the "English" and "Scottish" lodges to form the first Grande Loge de France on 24 June 1738 and establish Louis de Pardaillan de Gondrin (1707–1743), second Duke of Antin, as "general and perpetual Grand Master in the kingdom of France". It was this Grand Lodge that gave birth to the French Masonic jurisdictions that still exist today.

==== 1730s ====
In December 1736, the chevalier de Ramsay pronounced a discourse in which he propounded the idea of a chivalric origin for Free-Masonry. This idea later had a definite influence on the instigation in French Free-Masonry from 1740 to 1770 of a large number of Masonic Upper Degrees, which later regrouped around different Masonic rites.

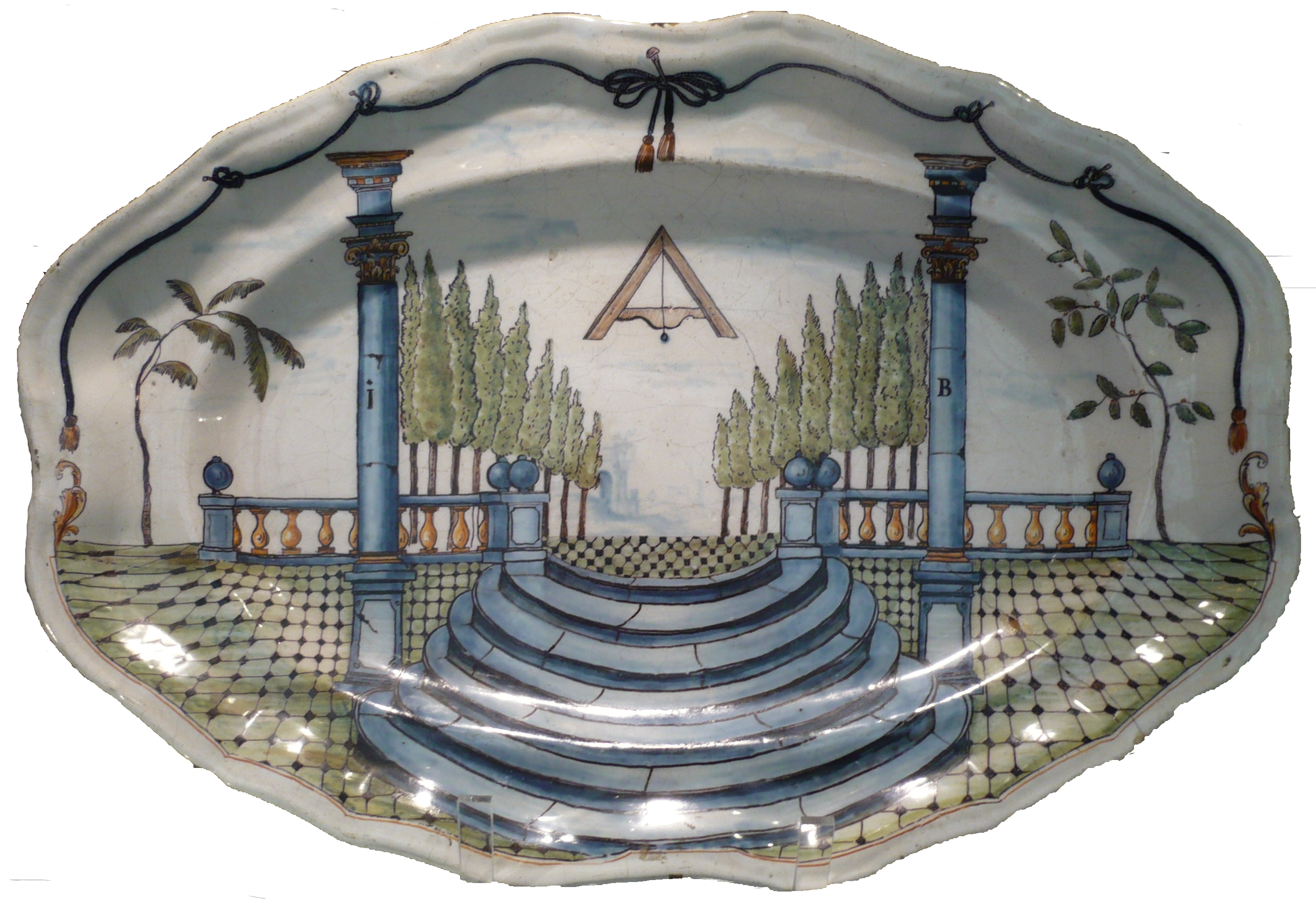
18th century Masonic plate from France.

The first revelation of Masonic secrets to the French public dates to 1737, and the following year these were published in the La Gazette de Hollande under the title La réception d'un frey-maçon ("The reception of a Freemason"), drawing on investigations by René Hérault, lieutenant of police, and the testimony of a Miss Carton, a dancer at the Opéra, to whom a Mason had told the secrets. The police interest reflects the absolute monarchy's fears of the dangers it could incur from a "society admitting people of all estates, conditions, religions, and in which may be found a large number of foreigners". It therefore forbade "all traiteurs, cabaretiers, aubergistes and others from receiving the aforesaid assemblies of freys-maçons". However, this did not stop them from meeting, under the protection of figures from the high nobility, such as the duke of Antin. Other investigations occurred from 1740 to 1745, giving rise to highly detailed police reports that now constitute a precious source for historians of Free-Masonry. These investigations were also accompanied by arrests and light sentences, until Free-Masonry definitively became part of French social life, with condemnations and sentences emanating from the monarchy ending around the end of the 18th century.

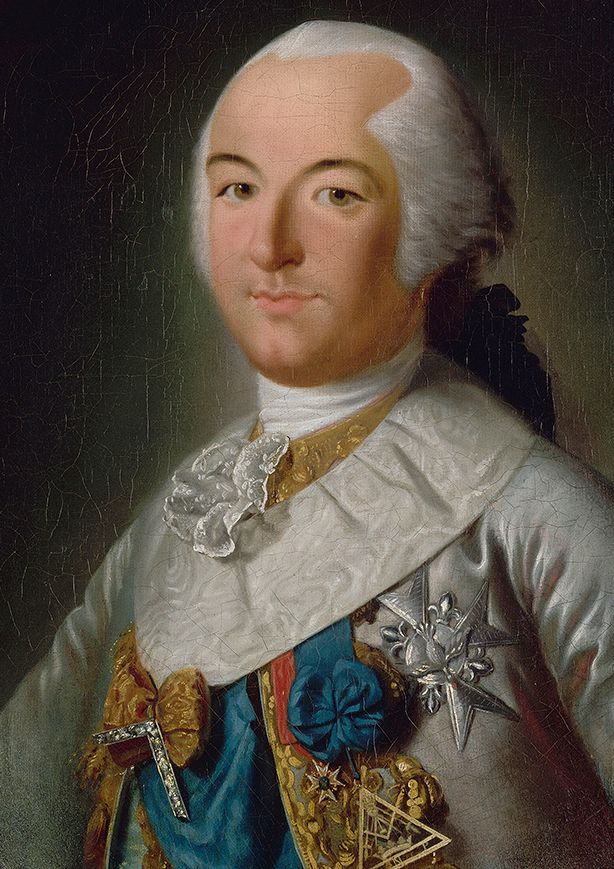
Philippe d'Orléans as Grand Master of the Grand Orient de France.

The year 1738 also saw the condemnation of Free-Masonry in the papal bull In eminenti apostolatus of Pope Clement XII. This was the signal for a wave of anti-Masonic persecutions across European countries more loyal to the see of Rome, but not in France, where the bull was refused registration by the Parlement of Paris for political reasons. French Free-Masonry was mainly Catholic in composition, including several priests, and remained so until the French Revolution.

==== 1740 to 1788 ====
In the 1740s, an original and mixed-sex form of Free-Masonry, known as "Masonry of Adoption" arose among the high French aristocracy, of which the duchess of Bourbon-Condé, sister of the duke of Chartres, was Grand Mistress. In 1743, after the death of the duke of Antin, Louis de Bourbon-Condé (1709-1771), count of Clermont, prince of the blood and future member of the Académie française, succeeded him as "Grand Master of all regular lodges in France". He remained in office until he died in 1771. Around 1744, there were around 20 lodges in Paris and 20 in the provinces. Lodges in the provinces were most often founded by Masons out of Paris on business or via the intermediary of military lodges in regiments passing through a region - where a regiment with a military lodge left its winter quarters, it was common for it to leave behind the embryo of a new civil lodge there. The many expressions of military origin still used in Masonic banquets of today date to this time, such as the famous "canon" (cannon, meaning a glass) or "poudre forte" (strong gunpowder, meaning the wine).

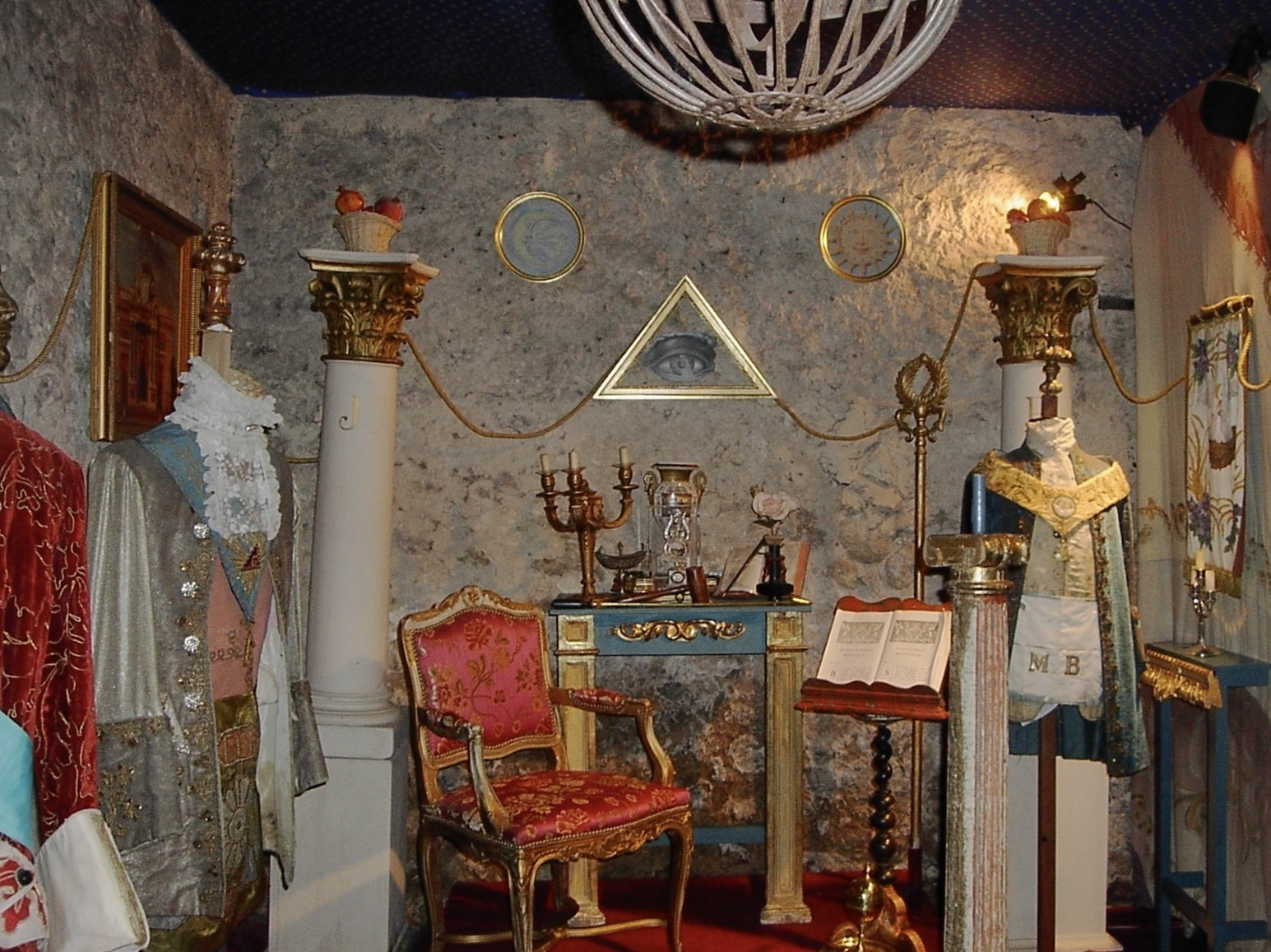
18th century Masonic temple at the Château de Mongenan (Portets, Gironde).

In 1771, Louis Philippe d'Orléans (1747-1793) succeeded the comte de Clermont as grandmaster. Under his authority and with the support of the provincial lodges for action against the hegemony of the lodges in Paris, the Grande Loge de France was reorganised and in 1773 changed its name to the Grand Orient de France, which accounted for 600 lodges. Only some "Vénérables", mainly Parisians, refused to give up being president-for-life of their lodges, resisting this reform by forming a "Grand Lodge of Clermont" which lasted until May 1799.

=== 1789 to 1815 ===
==== Revolution ====
Lodges in France in 1789.

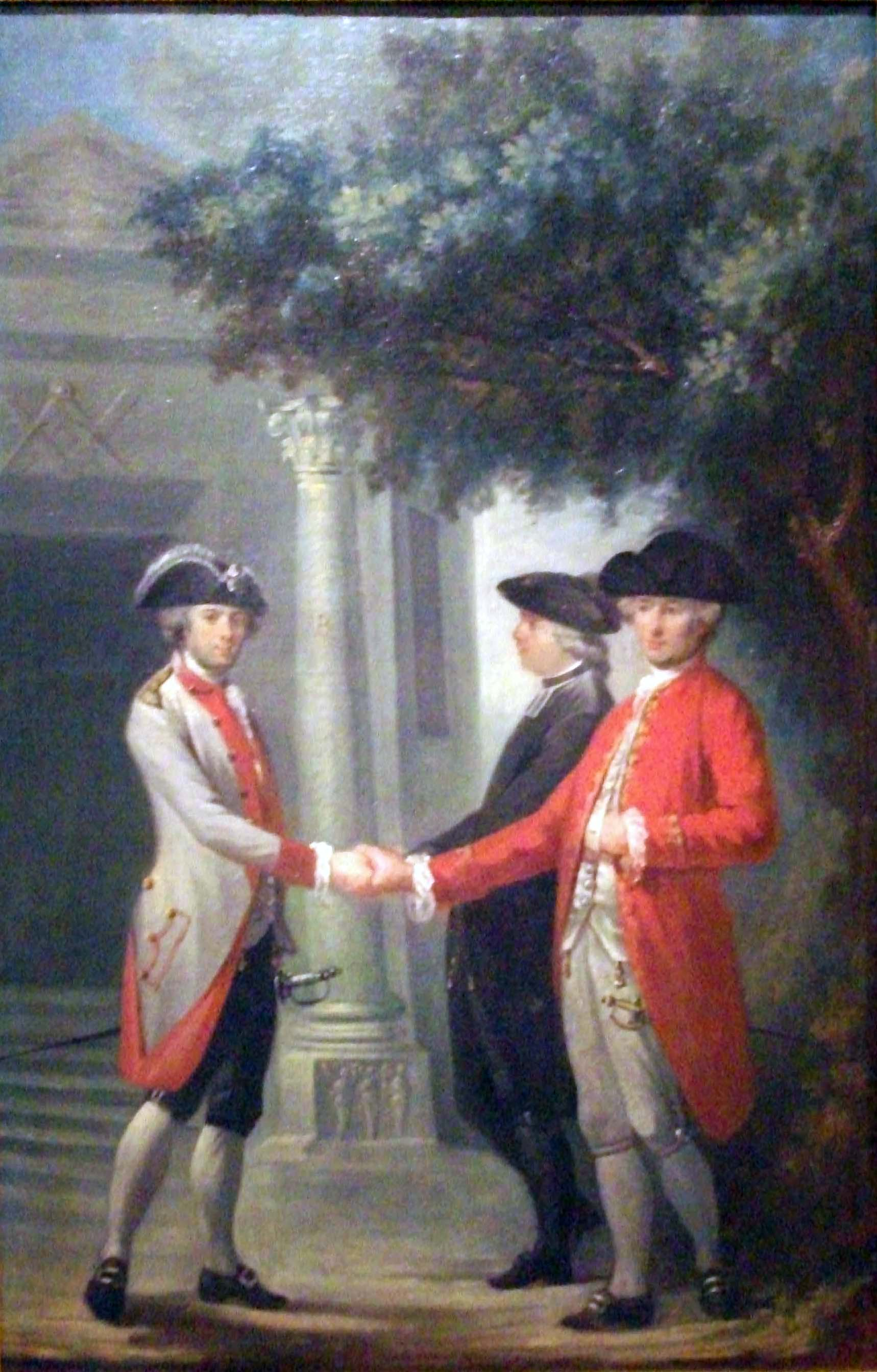
Nicolas Perseval, The Union of the Three Orders, c. 1789 - The painter has depicted the union of the orders taking place in front of the entrance to a Masonic Temple.

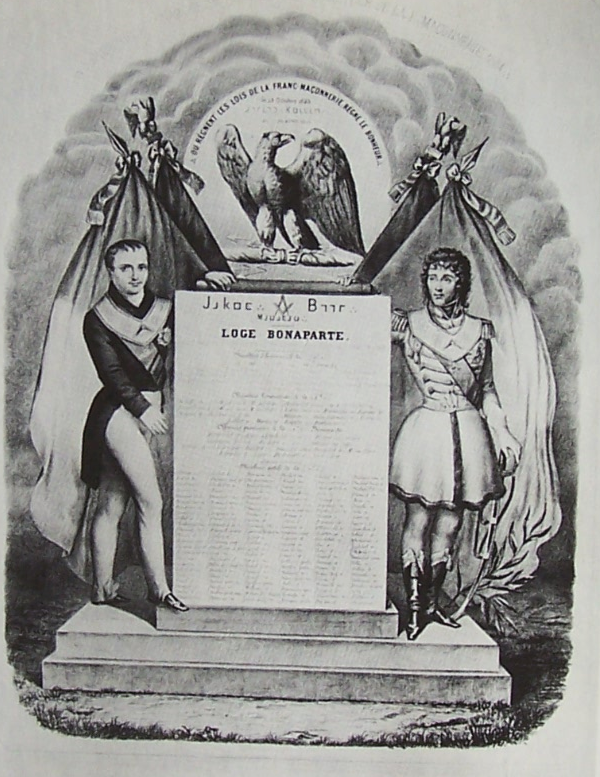
Table of the "Bonaparte" lodge, c.1810.

After the French Revolution, the Jesuit Augustin Barruel wrote that Freemasons had actively prepared the 1789 revolution, which has been used to back theories of a Masonic plot. This thesis was often reprised later, notably during the French Third Republic, by Catholic authors (using it to oppose both the Republic and Free-Masonry) and by Freemasons (to reinforce their pro-Republican stance and their positive image with the Republican government). In reality, there were Freemasons in both the Republican and monarchical camps. The Duke of Luxembourg, right-hand man to the Grand Master and moving-force behind the creation of the Grand Orient de France, emigrated in July 1789 and an aristocratic lodge known as "La Concorde" fled from Dijon as early as August 1789. Having become "Philippe-Égalité", the Grand Master of the Grand Orient himself publicly renounced Free-Masonry in 1793 shortly before being executed by guillotine.

Even though the Grand Orient proclaimed its attachment to the democratic form of government from January 1789 onwards, it was forced to cease its activities by the Terror between 1793 and 1796, and of the nearly 1000 lodges active on the eve of the Revolution only 75 were in a fit state to resume their activities in 1800. Nevertheless, by their functioning in the years before the Revolution, these lodges had assumed a certain independence from the State and the Church, probably giving rise to new aspirations. Among active Freemasons in the Revolutionary period were Mirabeau, Choderlos de Laclos, and Rouget de l'Isle, writer of the national anthem "La Marseillaise". In the French Egyptomania which followed their invasion of Egypt in 1799, around 1810 the Rite of Misraïm and "Egyptian" Free-Masonry appeared among French troops based in Italy, later spreading to France in 1814.

==== First Empire ====
The plebiscite of 6 November 1804 legitimized the First French Empire of Napoleon I. In the following days, Masons learned that his brother Joseph Bonaparte had been named Grand Master of the Grand Orient de France, with its administration effectively placed in the hands of Jean-Jacques-Régis de Cambacérès. One legend states that Napoleon himself had been a Mason, but comments he made on Saint Helena seem clear proof of the opposite:

[Free-Masonry is] a pile of imbeciles who assemble for good cheer and the execution of many ridiculous follies. Nevertheless, they carried out good actions from time to time.

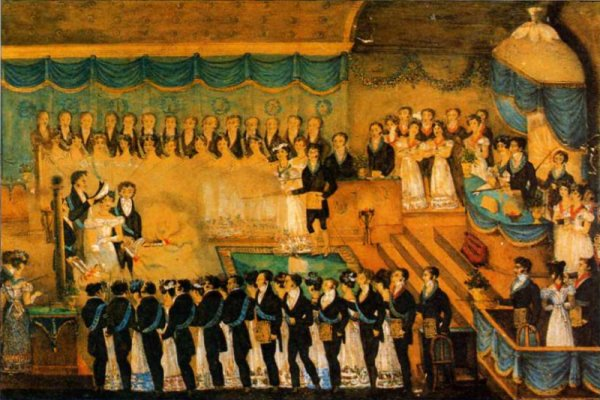
A young woman received into a lodge of adoption during the First French Empire.

During the First Empire, the Grand Orient de France was under strict control from the political authorities and little by little gathered almost all of French Free-Masonry (which had newly developed and quickly reached 1,200 lodges, mainly military ones) under its aegis. Nevertheless, in 1804 count Alexandre de Grasse-Tilly (1765–1845) came to France from his birthplace in the Antilles with powers assigned him by the Supreme Council of Charleston, founded in 1802. He established a Supreme Council of France and contributed to the creation of a "General Scottish Grand Lodge of France", under the protection of Kellerman. State centralism demanded the merger of these two institutions, which happened some years later.

=== 1815 to 1850 ===
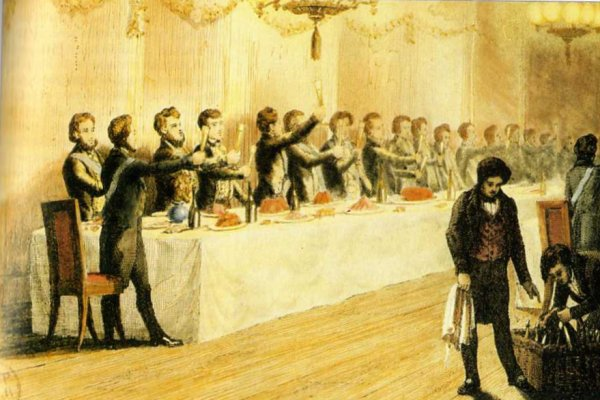
Masonic banquet around 1840.

In 1814, at the start of the Bourbon Restoration, the count of Grasse-Tilly reawakened the conflict between the Grand Orient de France (wanting to be the unified centre of all French Free-Masonry) and the Supreme Council of France (jealous of the independence of the Ancient and Accepted Scottish Rite) which then lasted until the end of the century. The First Empire's final fall the following year majorly weakened French Free-Masonry, which had been one of the Empire's key pillars, with the number of lodges falling to 300 around the end of the year 1820.

Throughout the 19th century French Free-Masonry little by little made itself more democratic and more politicised - several Freemasons were among the revolutionaries of the July Revolution and, with the exceptions of Lamartine and Ledru-Rollin, all the members of the provisional government of 1848 were also Freemasons. Lodges also became more and more anticlerical as Catholics left them in the wake of repeated papal excommunications (these had come into force in France through Napoleon's 1801 concordat).

=== Second Empire ===
In 1851, Napoleon III put an end to the Second French Republic and initiated the Second French Empire. As his uncle had done before him, he offered his protection to French Free-Masonry. He got the Grand Orient de France to agree to elect Prince Murat as its Grand Master but it did not wish to be represented by Murat. In 1862 they gained permission to elect a different representative and Napoleon III decided to name his successor himself - this was Maréchal Magnan, who was not already a Mason and so had to go through all 33 ranks of Scottish Rite Free-Masonry in rapid succession to take up the post. The imperial decree had forgotten to mention the other French Masonic Rite, and so the "Scottish Rite", under the academician Jean Viennet (1777–1868), only just managed to maintain its independence.

Two years later, the emperor newly authorised the Grand Orient to elect its Grand Master. Magnan was elected and remained Grand Master until he died in 1865 (the archbishop of Paris gave Magnan's absolution before his coffin, which was draped with Masonic insignia, for which he was criticised by the Pope). Learning its lesson from this authoritarian period, the Grand Orient suppressed the role of Grand Master at the end of the Second Empire, putting its leadership instead in the hands of a "President of the Council of the Order".

In 1869, there was a dispute between the Grand Orient and the Grand Lodge of Louisiana in the United States over the Supreme Council of Louisiana which the Grand Lodge of Louisiana did not recognize. This was a prelude to the schism of Continental Free-Masonry.

=== Paris Commune ===
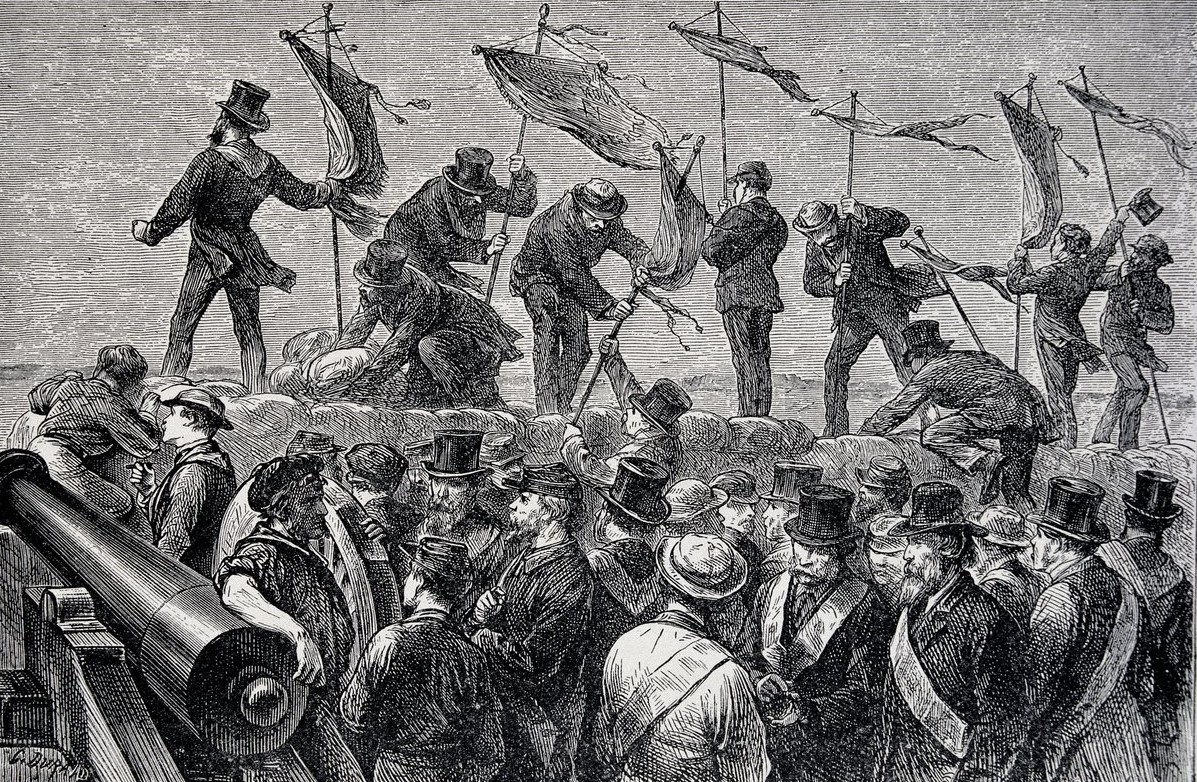
On April 29, 1871, the Freemasons demonstrated peacefully and planted their banners on the fortifications at Porte Maillot, in order to ask the Versailles troops to stop the bombardments of Paris and to negotiate.

In 1870, the Grand Orient de France numbered around 18,000 Freemasons and the Scottish Rite around 6,000. March 1871 saw the start of the Paris Commune, in which Parisian Freemasons were heavily involved. Thirifocq, a militant socialist and member of the "le libre Examen" lodge of the Supreme Council of France, demanded that Masonic banners be set up on Paris's ramparts and that they should be "avenged" should they be torn by the bullets of the anti-Commune forces. Many Freemasons figured among the revolutionaries, including Jules Vallès and Élisée Reclus.

On 29 April 1871, several thousand Freemasons of both obediences gathered behind dozens of banners for a large demonstration before the Versailles forces. This demonstration was followed by a meeting between two emissaries of the Commune (including Thirifocq) and Adolphe Thiers, which failed, and in the crushing of the Commune by the Versaillans. Unlike the Parisian lodges, those in the provinces did not support the Commune, on whose fall the Grand Orient officially disavowed the action of the Parisian lodges and rallied to Thiers and the French Third Republic, in which it was to play a leading role.

=== 1875–1899 ===
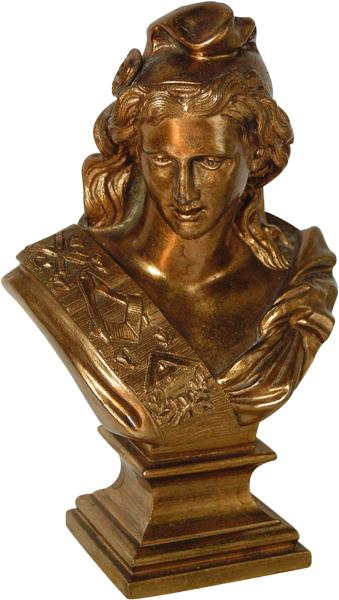
Jacques France (1879), Masonic Marianne.

On 8 July 1875, Jules Ferry (future minister of public education of the republic) and Émile Littré (author of the eponymous dictionary) were initiated in the "la Clémente Amitié" lodge. The French Republic wished to open secular schools throughout its territory and so entered into an open conflict with the Catholic Church, which opposed the opening of secular schools. It was in this context that the Grand Orient, which at this time made its support for the Republic official, decided in 1877 to abolish its requirement that its members believe in the existence of God and the immortality of the soul and for its lodges to work "for the Glory of the Great Architect of the Universe". In theory each lodge remained free to choose whether or not to continue respecting this former landmark of Free-Masonry, but (in a climate poisoned by 30 years of open conflict between the Republic and the former state religion of Catholicism) in practice all references to religion would be phased out of the rituals of the Grand Orient.

The decision to admit Atheists was not universally approved in France and led, in 1894, to a schism in French Free-Masonry. The lodges wishing to require a belief in Deity broke off from the Grand Orient and formed Grande Loge de France (the second organization of that name).

As for the Scottish Rite of the Supreme Council of France, the traditional obligation was not suppressed, but Grand Commander Crémieux in 1876 brought back into force that his jurisdiction should not impose "any form to the Grand Architect of the Universe". The Supreme Council also faced a secession by lodges of the three upper degrees, which intended to move out from under its patronage. In the end, it granted them their independence, merging them into the Grande Loge de France.

From 1893 to 1899, France saw the formation of the first mixed-sex mainstream Masonic obedience, which rapidly became international - the Ordre mixte international du Droit humain, which also adopted the Ancient and Accepted Scottish Rite.

=== 1900–present ===
==== 1900–1918 ====
French Free-Masonry began the 20th century with the Affaire Des Fiches, a scandal that left lasting traces and which bore witness to its implication in the politics of the era. It began in 1901 when general André, minister for war and Freemason, asked for the philosophical and religious convictions of some 27,000 officers, to help their advancement. Hundreds of Freemasons across the country sent in this information. In 1904, the press seized on the affair, causing a huge scandal and leading to the dismissal of General André.

In 1913 two lodges ("le Centre des Amis" and the "Loge Anglaise 204") left the Grand Orient and founded the "National Independent and Regular Grand Lodge", which was immediately recognised by the United Grand Lodge of England and until the 1960s remained mainly driven by Englishmen or Americans resident in France. In 1948 changed its name to the Grande Loge Nationale Française, which it still bears today.

Though the pacifist current, which appeared in France before World War I, also manifested itself in Free-Masonry, as in other countries, this current disappeared with the start of the war, and the first cabinet of the "Union sacrée" included 9 Freemasons. An international conference in January 1917 held at the Grande Loge de France included many European obediences. It launched an appeal for the creation of the League of Nations, and a similar conference in June that same year, representatives from 16 Allied or neutral obediences at the Grand Orient de France had the same objectives.

==== 1918–1945 ====
After losses in the First World War, Free-Masonry resumed its growth - the Grand Orient de France rose from 23,000 members in 1919 to 33,000 in the 1930s, whilst the Grande Loge de France rose from 6300 members to 16,000 in the same period.

Although a request by Antonio Graziadei to specifically forbid members of the Communist party from also being Freemasons had been rejected as the condition seemed "too obvious", the continued masonic connections of many French communists led to a specific condemnation by Leon Trotsky in 1922, and an ultimatum that they should publicly sever such links by the new year. Most socialist Freemasons who had chosen the French Communist Party after the split at the congress of Tours then left the party. Some of the lodges closed down in Russia by the Bolsheviks were re-formed in France by Russian refugees - "Astrée" within the Grande Loge, "l'étoile du Nord" and "la Russie libre" within the Grand Orient.

In the inter-war period, French Free-Masonry occupied a major place in the political appearance of the Republic and was strongly implicated in its struggles. It was thus particularly affected by the Republic's fall during the Battle of France in 1940. The Vichy regime and the German occupying forces united in October 1940 to organise an important anti-Masonic exhibition which toured throughout France. Its general theme affirmed the existence of a plot against France which had led to the country's fall and which, according to the theses of the Action française had been organised by "the Jew, the Protestant, the Mason and the Foreigner". A secret-societies service was set up in 1941, which studied articles confiscated from such societies and published "Les documents maçonniques", a review which saw in Free-Masonry one of the principal causes of France's defeat. A law of 1941 also applied the "statute on the Jews" to Freemasons. An anti-Masonic film, titled "Forces occultes", was produced and shown in Paris in 1943.

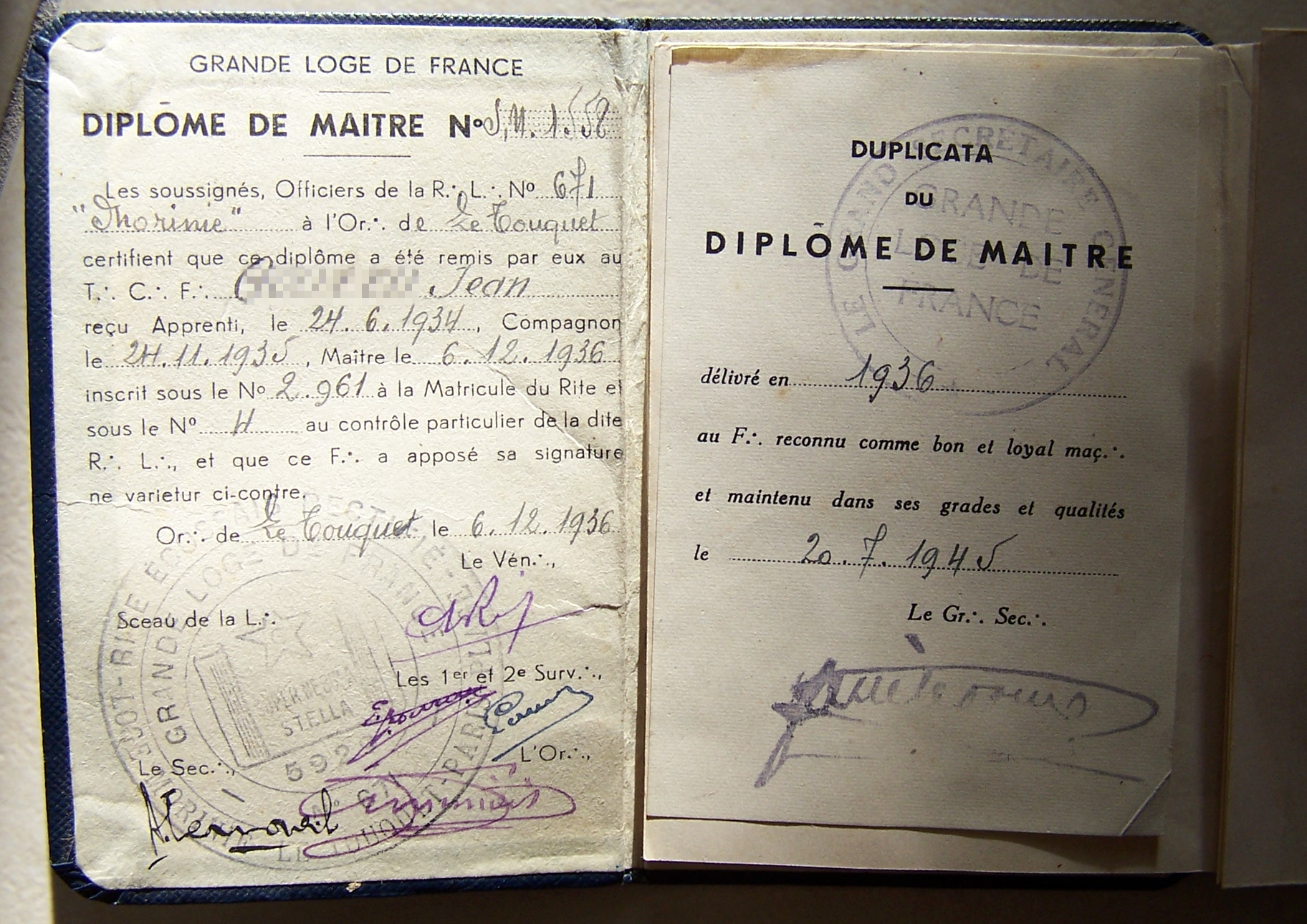
Flyleaf of a Masonic diploma witnessing to a purge, 1945.

A thousand French Freemasons were also deported or killed during the Second World War, mostly for involvement in French Resistance activities or due to their Jewish origins, with Masonic Temples pillaged and their archives confiscated. However, fellow-feeling that arose between Gaullists, Communists, and Freemasons working in the Resistance against a common enemy meant that, in the post-war period, the Communist condemnation of Free-Masonry diminished considerably in France.

When lodges revived after France's liberation, purge committees were often spontaneously put in place. However, the total number of active French Freemasons had fallen by two-thirds and French Free-Masonry took twenty years to regain its pre-war numbers and never recovered the political and social influence it had had under the First Empire, during the 1848 Revolution and under the Third Republic, preferring instead to turn to philosophical reflections that became ever more spiritual in nature. Also in 1945, the Freemasons of the lodges of adoption within the Grande Loge de France formed a "Women's Masonic Union of France" ("Union maçonnique féminine de France"), which in 1952 became the Grande Loge féminine de France. In 1959, this obedience abandoned the rite of adoption in favour of the Scottish Rite.

==== Postwar splits and unifications ====
In 1958, some brothers of the Grande Loge nationale française disagreed with its non-recognition of other French obediences and split to form the "Grande Loge nationale française dite « Opéra »", which has since then become the Grande Loge traditionnelle et symbolique Opéra (GLTSO). In 1964, the Grande Loge de France signed an accord with the Grand Orient de France, which provoked a break within itself and within the Supreme Council of France. Grand Commander Charles Riandey, accompanied by hundreds of brothers, thus left the Supreme Council to form another under the aegis of the Grande Loge nationale française, known as the "Supreme Council for France".

Since the 1970s, there have been several splits which have given rise to many small obediences, as well as many micro-obediences and independent lodges. Though the seriousness of some of them is unanimously recognised, others' conformity to Masonic traditions is not always well-established. Some authors see in this tendency a reflection of the individualist atomisation and rejection of institutions which (according to them) now characterise modern-day French society. On 20 February 2002 the Grand Masters, Grand Mistresses and Presidents of nine Masonic obediences met in Paris to sign the founding text of "French Free-Masonry" ("Maçonnerie française"), an expression originated as a 'brandname' by the Grand Orient de France. Its text went as follows:

[...]

Away from partisan controversies, engaged in an initiatory journey that emancipates consciences, the French Masonic obediences together affirm :

- The primacy of a balanced equilibrium on the initiatory journey, the practice of a symbolic method, and engagement in society as a citizen;
- The rejection of all dogmatism and all segregation;
- The refusal of all integrisms and all extremisms;
- The will to work for the betterment of the human condition, to the progress of individual and collective liberties;
- The defence and promotion of absolute liberty of conscience, thought, expression, and communication;
- The defence and promotion of secularism, an essential liberty which allows all others;
- Research into dialogue for peace, fraternity, and development

They decide to work together for the betterment of Man and Society.

In October 2002, this collection of obediences created the Masonic Institute of France (Institut maçonnique de France, or IMF), with the aim of "promoting the cultural image of French Free-Masonry across the historic, literary and artistic inheritance and its diversity" and of "rediscovering, deepening and making better-known to all interested members of the public the cultural and ethical values of Freemasonry". The IMF is both a foundation for Masonic culture and a study and research centre. It organises an annual salon on Mason books and awards a literary prize to an author who is not a Mason but defends ideas and values close to those of Free-Masonry. However, in July 2006, the Grande Loge de France decided to leave the association formed in 2002, and the Grand Orient de France decided to annul the 'brand name' "Maçonnerie Française" with the INPI.

In France, there are some 11 Grand Lodges, few of which officially recognize the legitimacy of the others. However, in June 2005, the Grande Loge Nationale Française and the Grande Loge de France took steps to improve their fraternal working relations by signing a "Protocole Administratif", allowing them to cooperate at a level below official recognition.

== Obediences ==
- Grand Orient de France
- Grande Loge de France
- Grande Loge Nationale Française
- Grand Lodge Mondial of Misraïm
- Women's Grand Lodge Of France
- Le Droit Humain
- Universal Mixed Grand Lodge
- Mixed Grand Lodge of France
- Grand Loge Ecossaise de France
- Grande Loge Traditionnelle et Symbolique Opéra (French Wiki)
- Loge Nationale Française (French Wiki)
- Grande Loge Unie de France

== Critiques and scandals ==
In the 18th century, the Pope banned Freemasonry, for reasons linked to the situation in Tuscany that were more political than religious. The relevant bull, In eminenti apostolatus was not however registered by the parliament of Paris and was never enacted in France. At the end of the 19th century, in the struggle between the French Republic and the Catholic Church, Free-Masonry and its then-powerful networks definitively backed the state, leading to the Affaire Des Fiches, and even came to be called "the church of the Republic".

In 2026, members of a lodge in Puteaux were put on trial for a murder-for-hire plot.

== See also ==
- Taxil hoax
- Freemasonry under the Second French Empire
- Grand Priory of the Gauls

== Bibliography ==
=== Works used in this article ===
- Dachez, Roger (2003). Histoire de la franc-maçonnerie française. Que sais-je?. Paris: Presses universitaires de France. ISBN 2-13-053539-9.
- Mitterrand, Jacques; Hutin, Serge; Guichard, Alain (1992). "Franc-maçonnerie". Encyclopédie Universalis. Vol. 9. ISBN 2-85229-287-4.
- Naudon, Paul (1981). Histoire générale de la franc-maçonnerie. Paris: Presses universitaires de France. ISBN 2-13-037281-3.
- Franc-maçonnerie, avenir d'une tradition. Musée des Beaux-Arts de Tours. 1997. ISBN 2-84099-061-X.
- Daniel Ligou, ed. (2000). Histoire des Francs-Maçons en France. Vol. 1. private publisher. ISBN 2-7089-6838-6.
- Daniel Ligou, ed. (2000). Histoire des Francs-Maçons en France. Vol. 2. private publisher. ISBN 2-7089-6839-4.
- Garibal, Gilbert (1994). Être franc-maçon aujourd'hui. Vol. 2. Marabout. ISBN 2-501-02029-4.
- <Please add first missing authors to populate metadata.> (1997). "Les francs-maçons". Historia. 48. ISSN 0018-2281.
- Christian Guigue (2013). La Formation Maçonnique. Christian Guigue. ISBN 978-2-9506708-9-2.
- "Les francs-maçons". L'Histoire. 256. 2001. ISSN 0182-2411.

=== Documentaries ===
- Grand Orient les frères invisibles - script by Alain Moreau, directed by Patrick Cabouat, produced by France 5 / Program 33.

=== Other authorities in this area ===
- Cumming, Ian. "Free-Masonry and Education in Eighteenth Century France." History of Education Journal (1954): 118–123. online
- Gould, Robert Freke (1887). Gould's History of Free-Masonry Throughout the World, Volume III. Charles Scribner's Sons.
- Halpern, Avner. "Free-Masonry and party building in late 19th-Century France." Modern & Contemporary France 10.2 (2002): 197–210.
- Jacob, Margaret C. Living the Enlightenment: Free-Masonry and Politics in Eighteenth-Century Europe (1991) excerpt
- Jacob, Margaret C. The Origins of Freemasonry: Facts and Fictions (U of Pennsylvania Press, 2007).
- Jacob, Margaret, and Matthew Crow. "Free-Masonry and the Enlightenment." in Handbook of Free-Masonry (Brill, 2014) pp. 100–116. online
- Jacob, Margaret. "The Radical Enlightenment and Freemasonry: where we are now." REHMLAC: Revista de Estudios Históricos de la Masonería Latinoamericana y Caribeña 1 (2013): 11–25.online.
- Jaunaux, Laurent/ Concise History of the French Regular Freemasonry, Philalethe Society, 2001
- Loiselle, Kenneth. "Freemasonry and the Catholic Enlightenment in Eighteenth-Century France." Journal of Modern History 94.3 (2022): 499–536. online
- Loiselle, Kenneth. "Living the Enlightenment in an Age of Revolution: Freemasonry in Bordeaux 1788-1794." French History 24.1 (2010): 60–81. online
- Snoek Jan A.M. and Henrik Bogdan. "The History of Freemasonry: An Overview" in Bogdan and Snoek, eds. Handbook of Freemasonry (Brill, 2014) ch. 2 pp 13–32. online

==== In French ====
- Pierre Chevallier, Histoire de la franc-maçonnerie française, 3 volumes, Fayard, 1974.
