= Éliane Brault =

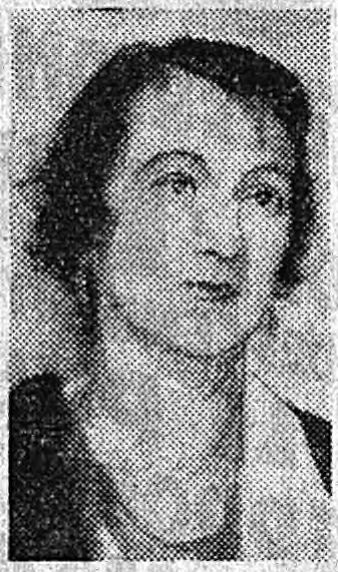
- Portrait of Éliane Brault
- Born: Éliane Anita-Élisabeth Brault; 18 September 1895; 9th arrondissement of Paris
- Died: 25 August 1982 (86 years old); Paris
- Resting place: Père Lachaise Cemetery
- Occupations: Politician, journalist, french resistance member
- Organization(s): Grande Loge de France (1920–1945) Union maçonnique féminine de France (1945–1948); Le Droit Humain (1948–1973); Universal Mixed Grand Lodge (1973) Suprême Conseil mixte de France (1980)
- Political party: Radical Party (1930s) French Section of the Workers' International (from 1945); Unified Socialist Party (from 1949) Union progressiste (1951–56)
- Spouse(s): Jean Sabourdin (m. 1910–1918); Louis Gaillié (m. 1923–1933)
- Children: Alexandre Gaillié; Roger Sabourdin
- Father: Alexandre Brault

Éliane Brault (18 September 1895 — 25 August 1982) was a French Resistance member, a political personality and a French journalist, also known for her commitment to feminism and her involvement in Freemasonry, especially within the Universal Mixed Grand Lodge, of which she was the first Grand Mistress.

== Biography ==
Éliane Brault was born in the 9th arrondissement of Paris to a rich family. Her father, Élie-Simon Alexandre Brault (1868–1898), was a lawyer at the Court of Appeal of Paris and also a doctor at Hôpital Saint-Louis. He'd just completed his month as an aide-major in the south when he caught typhoid fever by treating soldiers from the 22nd Chasseurs Alpins Battalion; he died a month later, a victime du devoir professionnel (victim of professional duty), at the age of thirty-one. Her mother, Isabelle Moses (1867–1942), was born in Lima to a Jewish Peruvian middle-class family that had converted to Catholicism.

During World War I, she married her childhood friend, Jean Sabourdin (1890–1918), who died in the front. It was in 1917, with Sabourdin, that she gave birth to her first son, Roger Sabourdin. She remarried in 1923; this time, she married a lawyer, Louis Gallié (1883–1974), with whom she had her second son, Alexandre Brault Gallié (1925–1971). In 1933, Éliane Brault and Louis Gallié divorced.

On top of her political and Masonic commitments, Éliane Brault showed an interest in the cause of childhood and adolescence throughout her life; she was Deputy Director of the School of Rehabilitation in Clermont, Oise, in 1936, inspector of a number of institutions in 1937, Secretary General of the Higher Council for Children and, a member of the Higher Council of Assistance publique (public assistance). In 1938, she published her recommendations in the Revue d'hygiène et de médecine sociale (the Journal of Hygiene and Social Medicine).

=== Radical Party ===
Her second husband, Louis Gallié, and Émile Borel, a pacifist, introduced her to the Radical Party, which she went on to join in 1925. She was committed to her work with the party, which she did largely with Marcelle Kraemer-Bach, a lawyer and member of the French Union for Women's Suffrage. She worked as a speaker and journalist for the papers Le Radical, La France radical, Le Républicain jacobin and L’Ère nouvelle. She was a member of the journalists' union and, through her articles and speeches, expressed her expectation of a society where the principles of freedom as well as equality of rights and labour are applied indistinctly. She had recognised expertise and she was one of the five women members of the party's bureau before 1940. She was elected in 1933—an election which was considered a feminist success against her opponents within the party. She worked towards a policy of social works and solidarity.

In 1934, amidst political crisis and the rise of the extreme right, Éliane Brault started l'Action démocratique des femmes (the Democratic Action of Women) and regularly marched in demonstrations in support of the Republic. In 1935, she founded la Fédération des femmes radicale (the Federation of Radical Women), of which she became president. After a trip to the Soviet Union, she became interested in the Soviet regime's position on women and children. It was because of this interest that she became closer to the Communist Party. The 1936 elections were a success for her and left-wing politics in France as many radical and socialist members of the Popular Front won their elections. She was part of the fight against fascism, and openly supported the Spanish Republicans as well as the victims of fascism throughout Europe. With the fall of Léon Blum's government in April 1938, she joined the left wing of the Radical Party. In 1939, she used her influence to open the borders and welcome children who had to flee from, or were orphaned by, Franco's regime.

=== Free France ===
After France's defeat in 1940 and the establishment of the Vichy regime, which excluded Jews and Freemasons from public office, Éliane Brault was the subject of denunciation in the extreme right-wing newspaper, Je suis partout. Being an anti-fascist, Freemason and of Jewish descent, she was relieved of her duties 1 October 1940. Due to having already made contact with the Resistance, she was arrested January 1941, and imprisoned in Marseille in February of the same year. She managed to escape and fled to Algeria and, afterwards, Casablanca where the British would allow her to go to London.

Upon arrival in London, she joined the Free French forces. She began organising a body of french doctors and nurses, taking command as a captain. With part of her group, she joined the 1st Free French Division in Beirut, where she remained at the disposal of command. She helped fighting the Nazi invasion of Russia and found the pilots of the Normandie-Niemen. In April 1944, she returned to Algiers and followed the French corps in the Italian Campaign where, from General Jean de Lattre de Tassigny, she received authorisation to create a unit of "liaison-relief" intended to give first aid and bring essential aid to liberated populations and combat zones.

After taking part in the Provence landings and the Battle of Alsace with her unit, she was summoned to assist in the perilous evacuation of Thann. She crossed the Rhine and stayed in the Black Forest until November 1945.

=== Postwar ===
At the end of the war, she resumed her duties at the Ministry of Public Health and Population. She received a certificate of higher administrative studies at École nationale d'administration, allowing her to work under the direction of the ministry until her retirement. She left the Radical Party and joined the French Section of the Workers' International (SFIO), where she committed herself to social work.

She continued her political commitment to the Unified Socialist Party and worked with various left-wing movements, such as the MRAP, Association France-URSS (France-USSR Association) and, the International Women's Democratic Federation. In the forefront of the socialist movement, she gradually moved away from the party; as she approached her retirement, she put an end to her political activities. However, she did continue her republican commitments, joining le Société des amis de l'école laïque (the Society of Friends of the Secular School), and she devoted time to Association France-Israël. As soon as she retired, she invested herself mostly in Freemasonry.

=== Freemasonry ===
Éliane Brault began her long Masonic career in the Masonry of Adoption at the Grande Loge de France. She was initiated 28 June 1927—thirty-two years old—at the adoption lounge, Union et Bienfaisance, then quickly became secretary. She also took part in the creation of Le Général Peigné in 1930. She was made a Worshipful Master from 1934 until the start of the Second World War. Furthermore, she attended the lodges La Nouvelle Jérusalem (the New Jerusalem) and Minerve (Minerva).

In 1945, she rejoined La Nouvelle Jérusalem within the Women's Grand Lodge of France. Later, she joined the Marie Bonnevial lodge at Le Droit Humain (DH). As the DH does not recognise the Rite of Adoption, she agreed to be initiated with the Ancient and Accepted Scottish Rite. She was successive secretary-general and vice president of the national council and the grand inspector of the order until 1969.

Feeling her role in DH was too heavily constraining and looking for a less symbolist approach which, according to her, tends to move away from societal reflection, she founded the Universal Mixed Grand Lodge (GLMU) in 1973, of which she became the first president, splitting from the other Freemasons. The GLMU worked with values close to those of the Grand Orient de France while being mixed. In 1980, she founded the Supreme Conseil Mixte de France (the Supreme Mixed Council of France) which gradually accepted the Scottish Rite. During this period, she wrote several books on Freemasonry and participated in radio programs.

=== End of life ===
Éliane Brault died 25 August 1982, in Paris at the age of 86. She was cremated, in accordance with her will, and her ashes were deposited in the Père Lachaise Cemetery.

=== Awards ===
For her actions in World War II, she won the Escapees' Medal and the Croix de Guerre 1939–1945. In 1936, she was made Knight of the Legion of Honour and, in 1947, she was promoted to the rank of Officer within the Legion.

=== Family ===
Her son, Roger Sabourdin, married Gratienne Nada, daughter of René Nada (Pathé Studios director), in 1938 at Notre-Dame-de-Lorette. The groom's witnesses were Marc Rucart and Paul Bastid; the bride's witnesses were Gratien Candace and Pierre Calvet, head of the film department of the Army.

== Publications ==
Éliane Brault published a number of books regarding the experiences and battles throughout her life.

- À l'ombre de la croix gammée (préf. Hassolt Davis), Le Caire, R. Schindler, 1943
- U.R.S.S., terre inconnue, une Française revient de Russie, 1946
- La Franc-maçonnerie et l'émancipation des femmes, 1953
- L'Épopée des A.F.A.T., 1954
- Maria Deraismes, 1962
- Psychanalyse de l'initiation maçonnique, 1965
- Le mystère du Chevalier de Ramsay, Prisme, 1973

== Bibliography ==
- Françoise Moreillon and the CNHRM of the GLFF (Catherine Jeannin-Nallet), "Pionnières I : fille d'Ève et de Marianne", Voix d'initiées, Conform Edition, no. 8, 2015 (ISBN 978-2917075296)
- Gaujac, Paul. "DES CORPS FÉMININS AUX AFAT: Afrique Du Nord 1943–1944.” Guerres Mondiales Et Conflits Contemporains, no. 198, 2000, pp. 109–122. [JSTOR].
