= Grand Priory of the Gauls =

Grand Lodge initiated by the French Freemasons

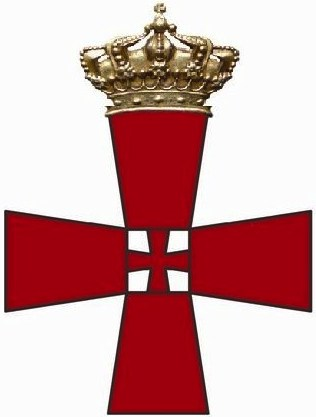
- Seal of the Grand Priory of Gaul GPDG
- Founders: Camille Savoire
- Types: Grand Lodge
- Country: France
- Website: gpdg.org

The Grand Priory of the Gauls is a Masonic Grand Lodge founded on March 23, 1935, originally named the Great Directory of the Gauls. Initiated by French Freemasons, particularly Dr. Camille Savoire, its goal was to revive the Rectified Scottish Rite, which had declined in France since the 1830s. The foundation followed unsuccessful efforts to establish an autonomous jurisdiction within the Grand Orient de France.

Amid a period when French Freemasonry was closely linked to political and social issues during the Third Republic, the new organization aimed to create a less politicized environment. It emphasized spiritual openness, avoided political and religious debates in lodge work, and sought to reestablish ties with “regular” Freemasonry. Camille Savoire and Édouard de Ribaucourt pursued different strategies to reach these objectives.

Despite its initial efforts, the organization struggled to gain a foothold, especially after being suspended during World War II. Its postwar reactivation did not lead to widespread recognition within French Freemasonry.

In the latter half of the 20th century, the Grand Priory underwent significant changes, expanding its membership and structure. These developments led to doctrinal disagreements, resulting in splits and the formation of other obediences practicing the Rectified Scottish Rite. From 1958 to 2000, it served as a high-degree body for the French National Grand Lodge. Over time, it evolved into a plural Christian order, incorporating other Masonic and chivalric rites from Anglo-Saxon traditions.

Renaming itself to include “Ordres unis,” it adopted the title Ordre des francs-maçons et chevaliers chrétiens de France. In 2006, it formalized its constitution on the principles of belief in God, adherence to the Christian faith, and oaths based on the Gospel of John.

== Historical background ==
=== Extinction of the Rectified Scottish Rite in France ===
The Wilhelmsbad Convent of 1782, which established the Rectified Scottish Rite (RER), had limited impact in France. By 1786, only the regions of Lyon and Alsace had a small number of Freemasons practicing the Rite, and relations between them were strained. The French Revolution subsequently halted all Masonic activities.

By 1797, Jean-Baptiste Willermoz, then nearly 70, remained virtually the sole French practitioner of the RER. Efforts to revive the Rite under the First Empire and up to 1843 led to the formation and reactivation of various lodges and directorates, but none achieved lasting establishment in France. Willermoz observed a “general chill” toward the Rite by 1820, and his death at age 94 marked a symbolic end to its presence in the country.

However, the RER continued in Switzerland, maintained by the Independent Grand Priory of Helvetia in Basel. By the early 1820s, approximately ten Swiss lodges practiced the Rite, including the “Union des Cœurs” lodge in Geneva, which later provided Camille Savoire and Édouard de Ribaucourt with the necessary rituals in 1910.

=== Masonic landscape under the Third Republic ===
During the French Third Republic, Freemasonry played a prominent role in political and social affairs. Closely aligned with the Radical Party, many Freemasons were actively involved in public life and contributed to shaping Republican ideology. Often referred to as the “Church of the Republic,” Freemasonry held significant influence and enjoyed broad electoral support. The Masonic landscape was marked by two major, closely linked but competing obediences, along with smaller groups that emerged from ideological splits, often reflecting more traditional or spiritual perspectives.

Committed to secularism, French Freemasonry opposed clericalism and supported Republican policies promoting secular education and the separation of church and state. Its stance evolved over time—from pacifism before First World War, to supporting national unity during the war, and later defending secular values between 1920 and 1924. It also supported the League of Nations before shifting focus back to symbolic and initiatory practices following the League’s decline.

The main obediences practiced distinct rites: the Grand Orient de France followed the French Rite, while the Supreme Council of France and the Grande Loge de France, established in 1904, practiced the Ancient and Accepted Scottish Rite. In 1877, the Grand Orient de France removed the requirement to believe in God, prompting the United Grand Lodge of England to declare itself the sole authority on “Regular Masonic jurisdiction,” which led to the isolation of French and other European liberal obediences from Anglo-Saxon Freemasonry.

== Great Directory of the Gauls / Grand Priory of the Gauls ==
=== Terminology ===
At its founding in 1935, the organization was officially named the Great Directory of the Gauls, as stated in the letters patent issued by the Independent Grand Priory of Helvetia (GPIH). However, the names Independent Grand Priory of the Gauls and Grand Priory of the Gauls quickly appeared in correspondence between the two bodies.

The convocation dated March 23, 1935, outlined the revival and installation of a “prefecture” in Paris and the issuance of letters patent authorizing the creation of workshops under the Rectified Scottish Rite and the organization of the Grand Priory of the Gauls.

In 1936, a treaty of friendship formalized the relationship between the GPIH and the Great Directory. Camille Savoire signed the agreement as Grand Prior, representing the Independent Grand Priory of the Gauls. After the original patents were lost, Julien Ribesky, Savoire's successor, requested an ampliation, which the GPIH granted, confirming that no changes had affected the legitimacy of the Grand Priory’s authority since its founding and the resumption of its activities in 1947.

Despite the original name, historians of Freemasonry consistently refer to the organization as the Grand Priory of the Gauls when discussing this period.

=== 1910 - 1935: revival of the Rectified Scottish Rite ===
Camille Savoire and Édouard de Ribaucourt, (Note: Another Freemason, Gustave Bastard, took part in these early actions, but left few Masonic traces.) Freemasons affiliated with the Grand Orient de France (GODF), sought to establish a Masonic space within France that could reconnect with foreign obediences. These international ties had been largely severed after the 1877 GODF convention removed the requirement to believe in God, distancing French Freemasonry from Anglo-Saxon obediences and contributing to its international isolation. The initiative also aimed to retain members opposed to political activism and attract new intellectual and social elites who were disillusioned by the politicization of certain Masonic circles.

Drawing on contacts developed through European travels and professional engagements, Savoire approached the Grand Lodge Alpina of Switzerland, which maintained recognition and preserved the Christian-based Rectified Scottish Rite (RER). Through this connection, Savoire, Ribaucourt, and Gustave Bastard were initiated into the grade of Chevalier Bienfaisant de la Cité Sainte, (Note: By “equivalence” of rank from the 33º degree of the REAA for Savoire, even though Ribaucourt is only 31º and Bastard 30º.) the highest degree of the RER, on June 9, 1910. Two days later, the Independent Grand Priory of Helvetia (GPIH) established a commandery of the RER in Paris and issued letters patent to authorize its reactivation in France.

Upon returning to France, they reactivated the lodge Le Centre des Amis, the last Parisian lodge to have practiced the RER in the 19th century. Although initially rejected by the GODF’s Order Council, the proposal was later accepted following discussions with the GPIH. The council approved the revival of Le Centre des Amis and authorized its operation under the Rectified Scottish Rite. (Note: The lodge is symbolically constituted in the French Rite and the Rectified Scottish Rite.) A treaty of alliance and friendship between the GODF and GPIH was signed in Paris and Geneva on April 15 and 18, 1911. The lodge was formally installed on April 28, 1911, by Gaston Bouley, President of the GODF Order Council, with Édouard de Ribaucourt as its first Worshipful Master.

==== Édouard de Ribaucourt: the choice of the United Grand Lodge of England ====
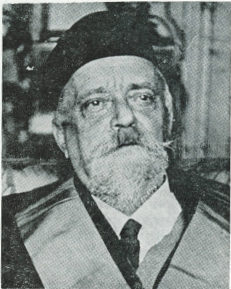
Édouard de Ribaucourt.

In the months following its reactivation, Le Centre des Amis operated without conflict. By 1911, the lodge had 32 members, adhered to the rules of the Grand Orient de France (GODF), and did not conflict with the principle of absolute freedom of conscience. However, in 1913, tensions emerged over the Rectified Scottish Rite (RER) rituals. The GODF’s Council of the Order handed the rituals to the lodge, but omitted references to the “Great Architect of the Universe,” and associated invocations.

At the GODF convent on September 16, 1913, Édouard de Ribaucourt proposed reinstating the use of the “Great Architect” formula. (Note: The change only concerns the 4th degree ritual.) He argued that these invocations, arranged by former Grand Commander Antoine Blatin, were compatible with freedom of conscience. His speech concluded with an implicit warning that he would leave the obedience if the request was denied. The proposal was rejected due to its explicitly religious language and perceived incompatibility with the GODF's secular principles.

Following the rejection, de Ribaucourt left the GODF and, through Swiss Freemason Gleward Roehrich—a former Grand Officer of the United Grand Lodge of England (UGLE)—sought recognition for a new Masonic body: the “Independent and Regular Grand Lodge for France.” UGLE granted recognition on November 20. De Ribaucourt, serving as First Grand Master, announced the recognition at a Centre des Amis meeting on December 9.

Despite this success, few lodges joined the new obedience. The obedience primarily attracted English-speaking Freemasons in France, who formed lodges practicing the Emulation Rite in English. As a result, the RER became marginal, and the group was often referred to as the “English Grand Lodge of France.” At the time of de Ribaucourt's death, only one lodge continued to work the RER within the obedience, reflecting its limited impact.

Camille Savoire remained with the GODF and continued his Masonic involvement through the Grand College of Rites.

=== 1936 - 1947: Camille Savoire and the Grand Directoire des Gaules ===
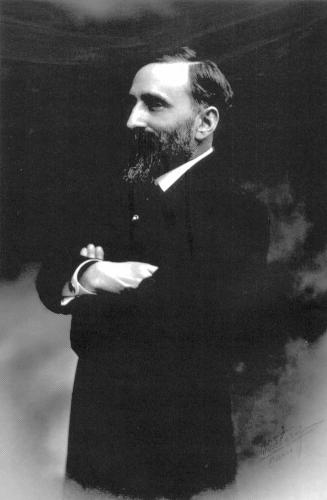
Camille Savoire.

On September 15, 1923, Camille Savoire became Grand Commander of the Grand College of Rites of the Grand Orient de France, a position he held until 1935. During his tenure, he reorganized the institution and launched the Bulletin du Grand Collège des Rites, first published annually and later biennially. The publication served as a comprehensive record of the work conducted by the chapters and areopagi.

Under his leadership, several lodges were authorized by the GODF’s Council of the Order to practice both the French and Rectified Scottish Rites in cities including Le Touquet, Rouen, Bordeaux, Marseille, and Montpellier. He also consecrated a 4th-grade lodge in Bordeaux based on the “La Concorde” lodge.

On September 16, 1933, Savoire led the Grand College of Rites to establish a section of the Great Directory of the Rectified Scottish Rite, assuming the role of Grand Prior. In collaboration with Arthur Groussier, President of the Council of the Order, he supported a treaty to create a Grand Directoire des rites autonomes, a high-degree jurisdiction. Savoire also proposed a national unification of high-grade Masonic bodies through the establishment of a Grand Priory to oversee the Rectified Rite. However, these proposals were rejected at the 1934 GODF convent, and Savoire faced strong opposition. This marked the end of his efforts to develop the Rectified Rite within the GODF.

In response, Savoire pursued alternative approaches. Leveraging his ties with the Independent Grand Priory of Helvetia (GPIH), he negotiated the formation of an independent body to represent the Rectified Scottish Rite in France. As a result, on November 24, 1934, several French Freemasons, including Aimé Machon, Grand Chancellor of the Grand College of Rites, received the degree of Chevalier Bienfaisant de la Cité Sainte (CBCS) from the GPIH. The number of CBCS holders in France became sufficient to support the creation of a new Masonic organization. (Note: A “prefecture” had to be created by at least 18 CBCS according to the codes of 1778.)

On February 12, 1935, Aimé Machon resigned from the Grand College of Rites of the Grand Orient de France (GODF) and issued a convocation for March 23 to initiate the revival and installation of a Rectified Scottish Rite (RER) prefecture in Paris. The convocation outlined plans to issue Lettres-Patentes authorizing the creation of workshops in the RER and the organization of the Grand Priory of the Gauls.

On March 20, Camille Savoire informed GODF Chairman Adrien Pouriau of the planned consecration and proposed three options: the practice of the RER within the GODF with full ritual autonomy; a treaty of mutual recognition with inter-visitation rights; or a complete separation under mutual non-recognition, while maintaining respect for historical ties. The GODF Council of the Order reviewed the proposals on April 14 and rejected them, (Note: The board's response comes 20 days after the date of consecration.) asserting that the RER was already practiced by several lodges within the GODF and did not warrant regulatory changes.

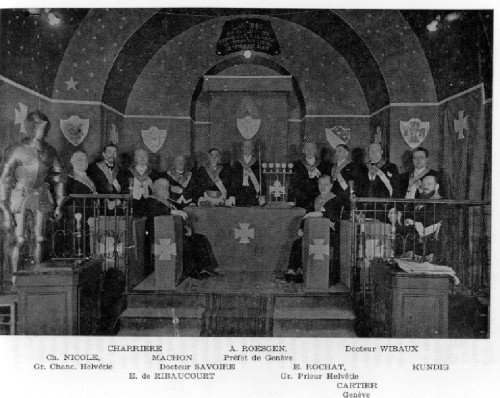
Foundation of the Grand Directory of the Gauls in March 1935.

The Prefecture of Geneva was formally established on March 23, 1935, at the Villa l'Acacia in Neuilly-sur-Seine. Presided over by Ernest Rochat, Grand Prior of the Independent Grand Priory of Helvetia (GPIH), the meeting resulted in Camille Savoire receiving Lettres-Patentes authorizing the creation of the Great Directory of the Gauls. As Grand Prior, Savoire was granted authority to organize the Grand Priory of the Gauls.

On September 9, 1936, Savoire and Rochat signed a treaty of alliance and friendship between the Great Directory of the Gauls and the Independent Grand Priory of Helvetia, establishing formal jurisdictional recognition. The treaty was signed by Rochat for the GPIH and by Savoire for the newly formed Independent Grand Priory of the Gauls. (Note: Or Great Directory of the Gauls.)

Savoire resigned from the GODF and the Grand College of Rites on April 17, 1935, after 43 years of membership. He presided over the Grand College for the last time on May 14, delivering a written statement explaining his departure. His decision was motivated by opposition to political and religious disputes, a commitment to inclusive spirituality, and a desire to reconnect with universalFreemasonry.

On October 24, 1935, Camille Savoire officially established the Rectified Scottish Grand Lodge of France (GLER) as Grand Master and Grand Prior. Comprising four symbolic lodges, he appointed René Wibaux as Grand Master. Although additional lodges were created, the GLER and the Great Directory of the Gauls failed to gain a lasting presence in French Freemasonry.

Acknowledging this, Wibaux initiated discussions with Louis Doignon and Albert Lantoine to merge the GLER into the Grande Loge de France (GLDF). A referendum among the GLER lodges resulted in five supporting integration and three opting to remain independent. The five lodges were incorporated into the GLDF on February 3, 1938. Savoire disagreed with this decision and declined the title of “Regent of the Rectified Rite” in the GLDF, a role accepted by Wibaux. Savoire continued with only one lodge under the Grand Directory—the “La Franchise” lodge, founded on January 27, 1938. The GLER ceased to exist after three years.

In response to the Vichy regime's anti-Masonic policies, Savoire suspended the activities of the Grand Directory of the Gauls on September 3, 1939, the day war was declared, to safeguard its members and structure. After the war, he announced the Order’s reactivation on December 15, 1946, and revived the “La Franchise” lodge on February 15, 1947. At that time, the Order had 42 members across all degrees. (Note: According to Pierre Noël, the Order had 136 members at the time, including 31 CBCS.)

Following Savoire’s death, Julien Rybinski, unable to locate the original 1935 lettres patentes, requested a copy from the Independent Grand Priory of Helvetia, which confirmed his position and issued an official duplicate.

=== 1948 - 1991: developments and divisions ===
==== Establishment of the Rectified Scottish Rite in the French Masonic Landscape ====
On October 24, 1948, at age 79, Camille Savoire was succeeded by Julien Rybinski as Grand Prior while retaining the title of Grand Master-National. After Savoire’s death in 1951, Rybinski assumed both roles before eventually transferring the office of Grand Master-National to André Moiroux. A new strategic direction was adopted, leading to the reactivation of the “Grand Lodge of the Rectified Regime in France” (GLRR), with Rybinski returning as Grand Master. Moiroux, assisted by Grand Chancellor Antonin Gaillard, contributed to the expansion of the Grand Priory of the Gauls (GPDG), which by then included a lodge in Paris, two in Lille, and one in Calais, and several 4th-grade lodges. The organization comprised three prefectures and three commanderies.

In 1952, Pierre de Ribaucourt, son of Édouard de Ribaucourt and a member of the Grande Loge Nationale Française (GLNF), proposed integrating the Rectified Scottish Rite (RER) into the GLNF. Rybinski agreed to affiliate with “Le Centre des Amis,” the GLNF’s founding lodge and a practitioner of the RER. Although initial steps were taken toward formal cooperation, Rybinski ultimately declined to sign a charter due to concerns about the potential absorption of the GPDG by the GLNF, leading to his withdrawal.

This breakdown in negotiations triggered internal conflict within the GLNF, resulting in a schism in 1958. (Note: As well as Pierre Fano, Fernand Planque, Pierre Massiou and the lodges Les Philadelphes, Entente, Sagesse, Beaudoin de Flandres, Centre des amis, Les Amis vigilants, and Saint Claudius in whole or in part.) Pierre de Ribaucourt and several lodges formed a new Masonic body, GLNF-Opéra, (Note: The obedience took the name of Grande Loge Traditionnelle et Symbolique Opéra in 1982.) adopting the RER as its foundational rite. This marked the reestablishment of the Rectified Rite in France, nearly five decades after its revival by Camille Savoire and Édouard de Ribaucourt.

==== Agreement with GLNF and first splits ====
In 1958, the schism within the Grande Loge Nationale Française (GLNF) weakened the organization after many lodges left to form GLNF-Opéra. To support the continued development of the Rectified Scottish Rite (RER), André Moiroux proposed integrating the Grand Lodge of the Rectified Regime in France (GLRR) into the GLNF, with the Grand Priory of the Gauls (GPDG) serving as its high-degree body. An agreement formalizing this integration was signed on June 13, 1958.

On June 17, 1958, during a meeting of the “Franchise No. 1” lodge of the GLRR, Worshipful Master Antonin Wast—also Grand Prior following Julien Rybinski’s death—presented the terms of the merger, which were accepted by the majority of members. As part of the agreement, Moiroux became a Grand Officer of the GLNF, which now included lodges practicing both the French Rite and the RER.

The agreement and the GLNF's rejection of exclusive alignment with English Freemasonry, along with efforts to engage with other French Masonic bodies, led to the establishment of the Grand Priory of France in 1962 by GLNF-Opéra. René Wibaux was initially appointed Grand Prior but was soon succeeded by Pierre de Ribaucourt.

The “Flandres” lodge, open to members from various French obediences, opposed a clause limiting access to the 4th grade to GLNF members. Although the GPDG continued to confer the highest grade of the rite until 1964, tensions culminated in the expulsion of René Rurcard, Prefect of Flandres. In response, he founded the “Independent Grand Priory of the Gauls” on December 30, 1965.

==== Development of the Order and Doctrinal Confrontation ====
On October 21, 1965, Antonin Wast, Grand Prior of the Grand Priory of the Gauls (GPDG), succeeded André Moiroux following his death in 1962. Wast signed an amendment to the 1958 agreement with Ernest Wan Hecke, Grand Master of the Grande Loge Nationale Française (GLNF). This amendment transferred oversight of the 4th grade to the GPDG and established a requirement that candidates for the highest degrees of the Rectified Scottish Rite (RER) must belong to "regular" Freemasonry. (Note: The rider specifies this obligation, with “C'est-à-dire, à la GLNF.”) Wast also launched the experiential journal Les Cahiers Verts, with its first issue appearing in 1970.

In 1973, Jean Baylot succeeded Wast after his sudden death. A direct link to the early RER revival by Camille Savoire and Édouard de Ribaucourt, Baylot led the GPDG for three years, adhering closely to the rite’s historical sources. Jean Granger briefly assumed the role in 1976 before ceding it to Paul Naudon, under a 1966 decree that separated the roles of Grand Prior and National Grand Master for life. Naudon was elected to the latter. However, tensions with the GLNF's Supreme Council of the Ancient and Accepted Scottish Rite led to his resignation. Granger was then elected as both Grand Prior and National Grand Master, effectively reversing the separation of offices.

During his leadership, Granger promoted the GPDG through his writings and public activities. However, his doctrinal views, seen as ecumenical and reformist, sparked disagreement, particularly with Grand Chancellor Daniel Fontaine. These tensions culminated in a doctrinal split. Despite organizing successful bicentennial events in 1982 to commemorate the Wilhelmsbad convent—including international meetings and an exhibition at the Bibliothèque nationale de France curated by Frédérick Tristan—internal disputes persisted.

In 1983, Fontaine, advocating a more conservative, Christian interpretation of the rite, succeeded Granger as Grand Prior. (Note: Its doctrine is severely criticized by the author and Orthodox priest Jean-François Var in the preface to his book La franc-maçonnerie à la lumière du Verbe.) The GPDG continued expanding internationally, contributing to the creation of the Grand Priory of Belgium and a new RER prefecture in Italy in 1986 and 1987.

=== 1992 - 2013: structural change and split ===
==== Integration of grades and orders, break with the GLNF ====
In 1992, the Grand Priory of the Gauls (GPDG), through Grand Prior Daniel Fontaine, received the transmission of the Masonic and Military Order of the Temple and Saint John of Jerusalem, Palestine, Rhodes & Malta. (Note: The CPDG received this patent in two stages: from the Knights of Malta, Palestine and Rhodes in 1992, and from the Knights Templar in 1999.) This Anglo-Saxon Masonic tradition marked a shift in the GPDG's structure. On this occasion, Grand Master Harold Devereux Still installed Fontaine as “Grand Master of the United Orders,” a title approved by the order's governing bodies on September 26, 1992. The GPDG subsequently adopted the designation “Ordres unis.”

In 1995, the GPDG received authorization from the Netherlands to confer the high degrees of the French Rite, including the final degree of Sovereign Prince Rosicrucian. These developments over the decade transformed the GPDG from a purely rectified body into one emphasizing chivalric high degrees and a doctrine centered on Christian militancy. The establishment of a “Grand Chaplaincy of the Orders” formalized this ecclesial orientation.

The GPDG’s expansion and integration of rites from other Masonic traditions generated tensions with the Grande Loge Nationale Française (GLNF), with which it had been formally linked since 1958 for the administration of RER high degrees. The GLNF criticized the GPDG's evolving structure and doctrinal direction, asserting that its emphasis on overt Christianity conflicted with the original 1958 agreement. On June 13, 2000, the GLNF formally ended the agreement by notifying Daniel Fontaine in writing. Fontaine contested the termination and began drafting new statutes for the GPDG. In response, the GLNF established the “Grand Rectified Priory of France” to assume responsibility for the RER high degrees within its jurisdiction.

==== Reorganization and a new constitution ====
Following the termination of its agreement with the Grande Loge Nationale Française (GLNF), the Grand Priory of the Gauls (GPDG) underwent a comprehensive restructuring and adopted a new constitution reflecting recent developments. New Masonic bodies were established to oversee symbolic lodges, including the “National Directory of Rectified Lodges” for the first three degrees of the Rectified Scottish Rite (RER). Additional structures were created: the “Grand College of the Lodges of Saint-Jean,” a Sovereign Grand Chapter for the French Rite, and a Royal Arch Chapter, all under the General Chapter of the GPDG.

The GPDG also expanded its official designation to include “Christian Freemason Orders of France” and “Orders of the Christian Knights Masons of France.” The Grand Chaplaincy was declared the “First House of the Order,” with national authority. This development raised concerns among some members, who viewed it as an indication of increasing clerical influence within the organization.

In 2005, after 22 years as Grand Prior, Daniel Fontaine stepped down. During that year, the Order's new statutes were reviewed and debated. The proposed constitution, presented at the General Meeting on April 29, 2006, emphasized faith in God, adherence to the Christian religion, and oaths based on the Gospel of John. While the text was adopted, it faced opposition from members who felt it diverged significantly from the principles of the original Grand Directory of the Gauls founded by Camille Savoire in 1935. Critics argued that transforming the GPDG into a multi-rite body with a national chaplaincy represented a departure from its foundational intent, calling it both an organizational and initiatory deviation.

==== New doctrinal quarrels and a new split ====
In 2009, a doctrinal conflict emerged within the Grand Priory of the Gauls (GPDG), reflecting significant religious and theological differences. Amid escalating tensions, Grand Master Marc Bravi resigned during the General Assembly, declining to install his successor. His successor, Bruno Abardenti, emphasized a distinctly Christian orientation in his inaugural address, calling for unity through an evangelical message.

To support further development, the GPDG reverted to its pre-1958 organizational structure, prior to its agreement with the Grande Loge Nationale Française (GLNF), and reactivated a Grand Lodge. The Grand Directoire des Gaules, originally founded in 1935 by Camille Savoire and inactive since the GLNF agreement, was revived in June 2011 under the name “Grand Lodge Reunited and Rectified.”

In 2011, a new ideological division arose concerning the doctrine of the Rectified Scottish Rite (RER) and the interpretations of its founder, Jean-Baptiste Willermoz. These disagreements became public, leading in 2012 to plans for a new structure dedicated to the RER. In 2013, twelve GPDG dignitaries—including former Grand Master Marc Bravi and the former official spokesperson—joined by members of the Independent Grand Priory of France (Note: High-ranking organization of the RER of the Grand Orient de France.) and its Grand Conservator, founded the “Rectified National Directory of France – Grand Directory of the Gauls.” This new body positioned itself as the conservative successor to the original 1935 Grand Priory established by Savoire.

== List of leaders of the Grand Priory of the Gauls ==
- Camille Savoire (1935-1948)
- Julien Rybinski (1948-1957)
- André Moiroux (1957-1962)
- Antonin Wast (1962-1973)
- Jean Baylot (1973-1976)
- Paul Naudon (1976-1977)
- Jean Granger (1977-1983)
- Daniel Fontaine (1983-2005)
- Marc Bravi (2005-2009)
- Bruno Abardenti (2009-2022)
- Gilles Ducret (2022–present)

== Rites practiced ==
Originally founded by Camille Savoire, the Grand Priory of the Gauls was established as a Masonic order dedicated exclusively to the Rectified Scottish Rite. Beginning in 1992, it incorporated additional rites and degrees from various Masonic traditions, including the Standard Scottish Rite, the Anglo-Saxon degrees of Order of Mark Master Masons, the Holy Royal Arch and the Knights Templar, as well as the high grades of the French Rite and the Orders of Wisdom.

== See also ==
- Freemasonry
- Grand Orient de France
- Grand College of Rites
- Freemasonry in France

== Bibliography ==
=== Specific ===
- Dachez, Roger (2021). Histoire illustrée du Rite écossais rectifié [Illustrated history of the Rectified Scottish Rite] (in French). Éditions Dervy. p. 192. ISBN 979-10-242-0630-1.
- Daffos, Dominique; Hillion, Patrick (2007). "De l'originalité de la pensée de Camille Savoire" [On the originality of Camille Savoire’s thought]. Actes du Colloque SFERE - Quatre grandes figures de l'Écossisme (in French). Paris.
- Dachez, Roger; Pétillot, Jean-Marc (2021). Le Rite Écossais Rectifié [The Rectified Scottish Rite]. Que sais-je ? (in French). PUF. doi:10.3917/puf.dache.2021.02. ISBN 978-2-7154-0924-8.
- Noël, Pierre (2000). "Heurs et Malheurs du Rite Écossais Rectifié en France au XXe Siècle" [The Joys and Sorrows of the Rectified Scottish Rite in France in the 20th Century] (PDF). Acta Maconica (in French). 10.
- Noël, Pierre (2002). "Le Rite Ecossais Rectifié en France" [The Rectified Scottish Rite in France]. Les Cahiers Villard de Honnecourt (in French). 45.
- Vivenza, Jean-Marc (2017). Histoire du régime ecossais rectifié : Des origines à nos jours [History of the Scottish Rectified Diet: From its Origins to the Present Day] (in French). La pierre philosophale. ISBN 978-2-3635-3045-5.

=== General ===
- Bauer, Alain; Dachez, Roger (2022). L'encyclopédie des franc-maçonnes et des francs-maçons [The Freemasons Encyclopedia] (in French). Gründ. p. 276. ISBN 978-2-324-03165-6.
- Ligou, Daniel (2017). Dictionnaire de la franc-maçonnerie [Dictionary of Freemasonry] (in French) (5 ed.). Paris: Presses universitaires de France. p. 1376. ISBN 978-2-13-055094-5.
- Saunier, Eric (2000). Encyclopédie de la franc-maçonnerie [Encyclopedia of Freemasonry] (in French). Paris: Le Livre de poche. p. 984. ISBN 9-782-2-5313252-3.
- Dachez, Roger (2020). Histoire de la franc-maçonnerie française [History of French Freemasonry] (in French). Paris/58-Clamecy: PUF. p. 127. ISBN 978-2-7154-0440-3.
- Chevallier, Pierre (1975). Histoire de la franc-maçonnerie française : La maçonnerie : Église de la République [History of French Freemasonry. Masonry: Church of the Republic] (in French). Vol. 3. Librairie Arthème Fayard. p. 480. ISBN 2-213-00162-6.
- Morlat, Patrice (2019). La République des Frères : Le Grand Orient de France de 1870 à 1940 [The Republic of Brothers: The Grand Orient of France from 1870 to 1940] (in French). Éditions Perrin. p. 835. ISBN 978-2-262-07726-6.
