= Mixed Grand Lodge of France =

Grand Lodge in France

The Mixed Grand Lodge of France (French: Grande Loge mixte de France) is a Masonic lodge in France, made up of men and women. It was first formed in 1981, with the support of the Grand Orient de France (another well-known Masonic lodge), by splitting from the Universal Mixed Grand Lodge (which had itself split from Le Droit Humain).
