= Paul Naudon =

French historian

Paul Naudon (16 April 1915 – 2001), was a Doctor of Law and a 20th-century French historian, author of several books on freemasonry.

== Main works ==
- Histoire générale de la franc-maçonnerie. Office du Livre. 1981. ISBN 978-2826401070..
- Les origines de la franc-maçonnerie. Éditions Dervy. 1991. ISBN 978-2-85076-974-0..
- The Secret History of Freemasonry. Inner Traditions, Rochester, Vermont. 2005. ISBN 159477028-X. (English translation of above).
- La franc-maçonnerie. Que sais-je?. PUF. 2002. ISBN 2130524893..
- Histoire, rituels et tuileur des hauts grades maçonniques. Éditions Dervy. 2003. ISBN 978-2-84454-197-0..
- Les loges de Saint-Jean. Éditions Dervy. 1999. ISBN 978-2-84454-030-0.
- Les origines religieuses et corporatives de la franc-maçonnerie;5th edition reworked and completed. Éditions Dervy. 1984..
- La franc-maçonnerie chrétienne;la tradition opérative, l'Arche royale de Jérusalem, le Rite écossais rectifié. Dervy. 1970..
