= Universal Mixed Grand Lodge =

Masonic lodge in France

The Universal Mixed Grand Lodge (French: Grande Loge mixte universelle, GLMU) is a French Masonic jurisdiction, formed by a split in the French federation of Le Droit Humain by those who felt that this jurisdiction's Supreme Council was too important in the jurisdiction's functioning (though the first attempts at its creation date back to 1913, with the creation of a Symbolic Mixed Grand Lodge that also felt this).
