= Alexandre Saint-Yves d'Alveydre =

French philosopher (1842–1909)

Joseph-Alexandre Saint-Yves Marquis d’Alveydre
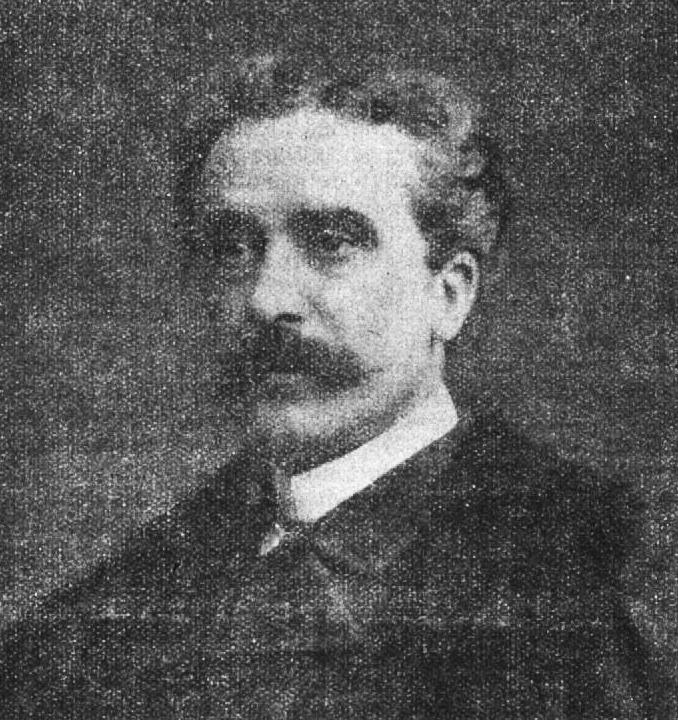
- Saint-Yves in 1892
- Born: 26 March 1842; Paris, France
- Died: 5 February 1909 (aged 66); Pau, Pyrénées-Atlantiques, France
- Occupation: Author
- Known for: Agarttha
- Movement: Occultism; Synarchism

Joseph-Alexandre Saint-Yves, Marquis d’Alveydre (French: [sɛ̃tiv]; 26 March 1842 – 5 February 1909) was a French occultist who adapted the works of Fabre d'Olivet (1767–1825) and, in turn, had his ideas adapted by Gérard Encausse alias Papus. His work on L'Archéomètre deeply influenced the young René Guénon.

He developed the term "synarchy"—the association of everyone with everyone else—into a political philosophy, and his ideas about this type of government proved influential in politics and the occult.

== Biography ==
=== Early years ===
Born in Paris, from a family of Parisian intellectuals and son of psychiatrist Guillaume-Alexandre Saint-Yves, he started his career as a physician at a naval academy in Brest which he soon abandoned after becoming ill. In 1863, he relocated to Jersey where he connected with Victor Hugo. In 1870, he returned to France to fight in the Franco-Prussian War during which he was injured.

He then began a career as a civil servant. In 1877, Saint-Yves met and married Countess Marie de Riznitch-Keller, a relative of Honoré de Balzac, and friend of the Empress Eugénie de Montijo, a move which made him independently wealthy. He dedicated the rest of his life to research and had a large number of influential contacts, including Victor Hugo. Saint-Yves later knew many of the major names in French occultism such as Marquis Stanislas de Guaita, Joséphin Péladan and Oswald Wirth and was a member of a number of Rosicrucian, and Freemason style orders. Saint-Yves supposedly inherited the papers of one of the great founders of French occultism, Antoine Fabre d'Olivet (1762–1825).

In 1877, he published the Lyrical Testament, a collection of poetry, and Keys of the Orient. In the latter book, he presents a solution (based on developing a religious understanding between Jews, Christians and Muslims) to the Question of the Orient, brought about by the decay of the Ottoman Empire which caused tensions in the Near and Middle East.

He also began to study the development of industrial applications of marine plants (Utilising extracts from seaweed was published in 1879) but he could not perform the operation for lack of capital. In 1880, he was granted the title of Marquis of Alveydre by the government of San Marino.

His book Mission des Juifs (1884) was favourable to Jews. The material from it was used for The Secret of the Jews, an anti-semitic tract attributed to Yuliana Glinka.

=== Development of synarchy ===
Saint-Yves used the term "synarchy" in his book La France vraie to describe what he believed was the ideal form of government. In reaction to the emergence of anarchist ideologies and movements, Saint-Yves had elaborated a more conservative political-theological formula over a series of 4 books from 1882 onwards which he believed would result in a harmonious society by considering it as an organic unity. This ideal was based partially on his idealised view of life in medieval Europe and also on his ideas about successful government in India, Atlantis, and Ancient Egypt. He defended social differentiation and hierarchy with co-operation between social classes, transcending conflict between social and economic groups: synarchy, as opposed to anarchy. Specifically, Saint-Yves envisioned a European society with a government composed of three councils, representing economic power, judicial power, and scientific community, of which the metaphysical chamber bound the whole structure together. These ideas were also influenced by works such as Plato's The Republic and by Martinism. They also influenced the young René Guénon who published several articles on L'Archéomètre in his early life. L'Archéomètre was edited and published by Gérard Encausse alias Papus after Saint-Yves' death.

As part of this concept of government Alexandre Saint-Yves d'Alveydre, gave an important role to secret societies or, more precisely, esoteric societies, which are composed of oracles and who safeguarded the government from behind the scenes. He saw the Rosicrucians as having fulfilled this role in medieval Europe and was involved with a number of Freemason and other groups who claimed descent from the Knights Templars.

=== Contact with Agarttha ===
Jamal ud Din al Afghani, posing as Haji Sharif, who inspired Saint-Yves d’Alveydre in synarchy.

During 1885, Saint-Yves was allegedly visited by a group of Eastern Initiates, one of them being named Prince Hardjij Scharipf. It was then that he associated synarchy with "ascended masters" based in caverns of Agarttha, who supposedly communicated with him telepathically. He wrote about this secret location in his Mission de l'Inde en Europe published in 1886. Worried he had revealed too much and apparently under the influence of his oriental contacts, he destroyed all but two copies of this book. One of which was owned by Gérard Encausse alias Papus, who edited and published it in 1910.

Saint-Yves believed that an ancient synarchist world government was transferred to Agarttha within a hollow Earth at the start of the Kali Yuga age, around 3,200 BC. Saint-Yves d'Alveydre was the man who really introduced the concept of Agarttha to the Western world. This concept was later developed by Zam Bothiva and the Fraternité des Polaires in France, and more importantly by the Thule-Gesellschaft in Nationalist circles of Germany.

=== Final years ===
After Saint-Yves's death, portions of the writings he left behind were compiled by a group of his friends and devotees, driven by Gérard Encausse alias Papus, into a volume entitled l'Archéomètre. The title is Saint-Yves's name for a colour-coded diagram he developed, showing symbolic correspondences between elements in astrology, music, alphabets, gematria, and other areas. This book has been translated into Spanish and was translated into English for the first time in 2007 (publication pending).

== Influence ==
Saint-Yves's main disciple was the prominent occultist Gérard Encausse alias Papus who established a number of societies based on synarchist ideas. Other notable followers included Victor Blanchard (1878–1953), Nizier Anthelme Philippe, René A. Schwaller de Lubicz, René Guénon and Emile Dantinne.

Saint-Yves's ideas influenced the turbulent French politics of the early twentieth century where they served as a model for a number of right-wing groups and also in Mexico where synarchist groups have had a major political role. Theories concerning synarchist groups also have become a key element in a number of conspiracy theories.

=== Saint-Yves on the Great Sphinx of Giza ===
One of Saint-Yves's most influential theories nowadays was a minor feature of his work. This is his claim that the Great Sphinx was much older than Egyptologists thought, being created around 12,000 BC. He believed the Sphinx was created by escapees from the destruction of Atlantis. He did not base this claim on any physical evidence. Saint-Yves' disciple René A. Schwaller de Lubicz was thus inspired to investigate the age of the Sphinx and, as a result, inspired an ongoing Great Sphinx controversy over the age of the monument.

== Bibliography ==
- Le Retour du Christ, 1874
- Clefs de l'Orient, 1877
- Testament lyrique, 1877
- Le Mystère du Progrès, 1878
- De l'utilité des algues marines, 1879
- Mission des Souverains, 1882
- Mission des Ouvriers, 1882
- Mission des Juifs, 1884
- Les funérailles de Victor Hugo, 1885
- Mission de l'Inde en Europe, mission de l’Europe en Asie : la question du Mahatma et sa solution], 1886 (online version)
  - Translated as: Marquis Saint-Yves d'Alveydre, Alexandre (2008). The Kingdom of Agarttha: A Journey into the Hollow Earth (in French) (2nd ed.). Inner Traditions; Illustrated edition. ASIN B005CW62B2. ISBN 978-1594777226.
- La France vraie ou la Mission des Français, 1887
- Voeux du syndicat de la Presse économique, 1887
- Les États-généraux du suffrage universel, 1888
- Le centenaire de 1789 - Sa conclusion, 1889
- L'ordre économique dans l'Electorat et dans l'Etat, 1889
- Le poème de la Reine, 1889
- Maternité royale et mariages royaux, 1889
- L'Empereur Alexandre III épopée russe, 1889
- Jeanne d'Arc victorieuse, 1890
- Des brevets pour des applications de l'Archéomètre, 1903 et suivantes
- Théogonie des Patriarches, 1909 (posthumous)
- L'Archéomètre - Clef de toutes les religions et de toutes les sciences de l'Antiquité - Réforme synthétique de tous les arts contemporains, 1910 (posthumous)
