= Alphonse Osbert =

French painter

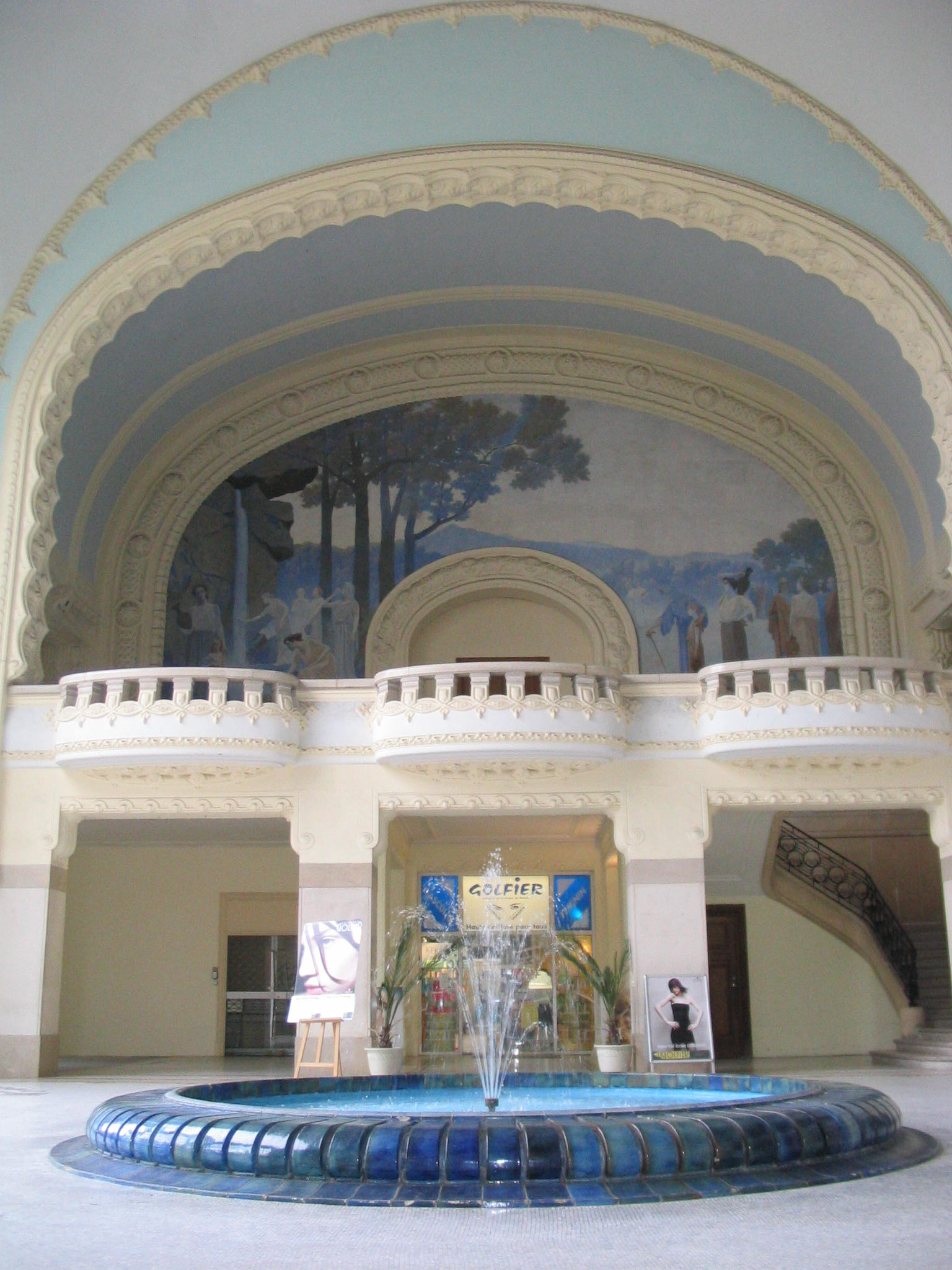
The Source. Painting by Alphonse Osbert. Centre Thermal des Dômes, Vichy, France

Alphonse Osbert (23 March 1857 – 11 August 1939) was a French Symbolist painter.

Educated at the École des Beaux-Arts, his earliest passion was for the great Spanish masters, particularly Jusepe de Ribera. A shift away from his academic style took place in the late 1880s under the influence of several acquaintances associated with Post-Impressionism and Symbolism. Osbert abandoned naturalistic painting in favour of a Pointillist technique like that employed by Seurat and Signac. Also inspired by Pierre Puvis de Chavannes and the Symbolists, he chose to forsake depiction of real-world subject matter, and developed a poetic visual language of his own. His signature style consists of ghostlike Muses in mysterious landscapes bathed in the unearthly light of a sun or moon, rendered with abundant use of the colour blue. In the 1890s he was associated with Joséphin Péladan and his order, the Kabbalistic Order of the Rose-Cross.

Osbert's later works include a few commissioned murals, for sites including the Centre Thermal des Dômes in Vichy (1903 and 1904), and the Church Of Saint-Louis in Vichy (1915). An overview of his career titled 'Le peintre symboliste Alphonse Osbert', written by Véronique Dumas, was published by CNRS in 2005.
