= Joséphin Péladan =

French novelist and Rosicrucian (1858–1918)

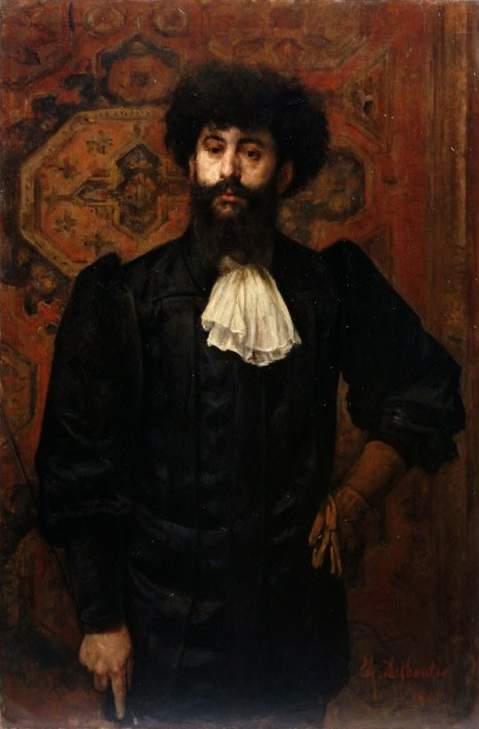
- Portrait of Joséphin Péladan by Marcellin Desboutin (1891)
- Born: Joseph-Aimé Péladan, dit le Sar Mérodack Joséphin Peladan; 28 March 1858; Lyon, France
- Died: 27 June 1918 (aged 60); Neuilly-sur-Seine, France
- Resting place: Cimetière des Batignolles
- Known for: Occultism, art criticism, painting, dramaturgy, novel writing
- Movement: Symbolist art
- Parents: Louis-Adrien Péladan (father); Joséphine Vaquier (mother)

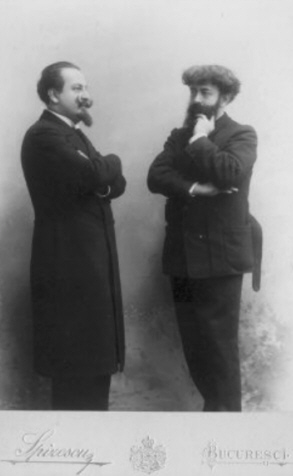
Photograph of Péladan (right) and the Romanian writer Alexandru Bogdan-Pitești, during a visit to Bucharest

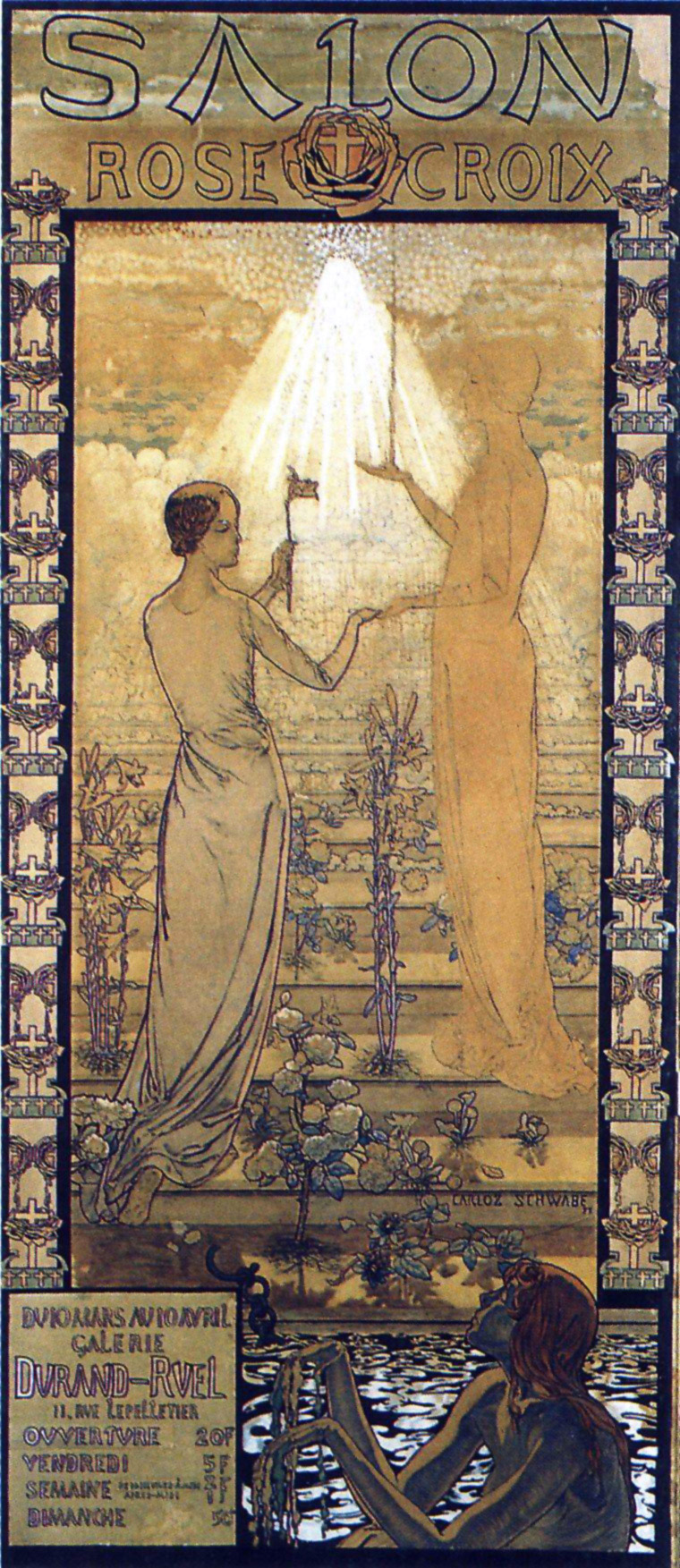
Promotional poster for the Salon de la Rose + Croix

Joséphin Péladan (28 March 1858 – 27 June 1918) was a French novelist and Rosicrucian who later briefly joined the Martinist order led by Papus (Gérard Encausse). His father was a journalist who had written on prophecies, and professed an esoteric-aesthetic form of Rosicrucianism and universalist Catholicism. He established the Salon de la Rose + Croix for painters, writers, and musicians sharing his artistic ideals, the Symbolists in particular.

== Biography ==
Péladan was born into a Lyon family that was devoutly Roman Catholic. He studied at Jesuit colleges at Avignon and Nîmes. After he failed his baccalaureat, Péladan moved to Paris and became a literary and art critic. His older brother Adrien studied alchemy and occultism as well. Péladan was an extremely active member of the French Occult Revival and a key influence on French and Belgian Symbolist art. However, his eccentric manner and overbearing nature caused him to be largely ridiculed during his lifetime, and quickly forgotten upon his early death at Neuilly-sur-Seine, from shellfish poisoning.

== Career ==
In 1882 he came to Paris where Arsene Houssaye gave him a job on his artistic review, L'Artiste. In 1884 he published his first novel, Le vice suprême, which recommended the salvation of man through occult magic of the ancient East. His novel was an instant success with the French public, which was experiencing a revived interest in spirituality and mysticism. The novel went through several printings.

Péladan's Le vice suprême and subsequent novels are interwoven with Rosicrucian and occult themes. He shared the design of his full cycle of novels – often including those in planning – in appendices to many of his books. After reading Péladan's first novel, the French poet Stanislas de Guaita became interested in occultism. Following long correspondence, the two became acquainted in Paris. Péladan was somewhat influenced by the teachings of Eliphas Lévi, but his main focus drew on the Rosicrucian tenets derived from the order of Toulouse Rosicrucians into which he had been initiated by his brother Adrien, with a strong focus on doing good in the world and reaching for spiritual ideals. Péladan initiated de Guaita into his order, and soon afterwards, de Guaita shared his vision of building an esoteric school that would blend and revive historical esoteric orders. After becoming acquainted with Gérard Encausse, de Guaita convinced Péladan that they should work together to realise this project.

Encausse, who went by the pseudonym "Papus", was a Spanish-born French physician and occultist who had written books on magic, Kabbalah and the Tarot. In 1888, the three men founded the Kabbalistic Order of the Rose-Croix (French Order Kabbalistique de Rose-Croix, O.K.R.C.).

Among other teachings, the OKRC provided training in a syncretic form of Kabbalah originating in an esoteric form of Jewish mysticism, which attempts to reveal hidden mystical insights in the Hebrew Bible and divine nature. The other council members drew in elements of Martinism, Masonic, and Theosophical thought. The order also conducted examinations and provided university degrees on esoteric topics. De Guaita had a large private library of books on metaphysical issues, magic, and the "hidden sciences." He was nicknamed the "Prince of the Rosicrucians" by his contemporaries for his broad learning on Rosicrucian issues.

By the 1890s, De Guaita, Papus and Péladan's collaboration became increasingly strained by disagreements over strategy and doctrines. De Guaita and Papus lost Péladan's support, who left to start an order that was closer to his own vision. In June 1890, Péladan created a quasi-Catholic Ordre du Temple de la Rose + Croix. He designated himself Grand Master, and created an open structure in three levels: Squire, Knight, and Commander. Sworn members and adepts could serve according to their inclination and talents: through the arts and sciences; through a reformed version of the Catholic faith; or a more mystical approach of communion with the Holy Spirit. Péladan envisioned an international network of members applying the best of human talent for an ultimately humanist approach to life.

== Ordre du Temple de la Rose + Croix and the Salons de la Rose + Croix ==
The Ordre du Temple de la Rose + Croix became Péladan's outlet for his beliefs concerning the role of spirituality and idealism in art. As an art critic, Péladan had been vocal in critiquing the dominant trends in French art, which included officially sanctioned styles promoted by the academy, and the Impressionists.

He believed that art with encoded spiritual messages and symbols could act as a method for awakening the general public to spiritual ascent, and wrote his manifesto, L'art idéaliste et mystique: Doctrine de l'ordre et du salon annuel des Roses-Croix (1894), to present his doctrine and explain his vision. He subsequently expanded on this in Amphithéâtre des Sciences Mortes, a cycle of seven esoteric manuals intended for lay readers wishing to access his system of self-initiation and self-actualisation.

Through his order, between 1892 and 1897 he organised a series of six exhibits of Symbolist artists and associated French avant-garde painters, writers, and musicians, as the Salons de la Rose + Croix. The Salons were enormously popular with the press and public, but failed to succeed in revolutionising French art, as Péladan had hoped. Nevertheless, Péladan had a strong impact on many well-known literary figures, such as August Strindberg and Ezra Pound, on Latin American literature and poetry, while his esoteric ideas were absorbed, both credited and uncredited, into other 20th century esoteric movements.

Péladan used the initiatory name Sâr Mérodack until around 1900 when, disappointed and disillusioned by the lack of understanding his vision had met with, he silently abandoned it. Péladan had been ridiculed by his contemporaries for posing as a Babylonian Mage and claiming, for a time, that the title had been inherited through his family. However, he explains in his work that the choice of name and his identification with Merodack (the Babylonian god Marduk) was part of his initiatory system, in which one attempts to embody one's highest ideals.

== Publications ==
Péladan wrote over a hundred books, novels, and plays interconnected in an elaborate structure intended to use as many communication channels as possible to reach readers from all walks of life. His novels have been considered symbolic works designed to spark an esoteric awakening in the reader, while his esoteric non-fiction works are handbooks for solitary self-initiation.

- Le Vice suprême, novel, 1884
- Curieuse, 1885
- Femmes honnêtes!, 1885
- L'Initiation sentimentale, 1887
- Istar, 1888
- A coeur perdu, 1888
- Coeur en peine, 1890
- Comment on devient mage, 1891
- L'androgyne, 1891
- La gynandre, 1891
- La Typhonia, 1892
- Le panthée, 1892
- La queste du Graal - proses lyriques de l'éthopée - la décadence latine; published "au salon de la Rose+Croix" (1892)
- Comment on devient fée, 1893
- Le théâtre complet de Wagner: les XI opéras scène par scène avec notes biographiques et critiques, 1894
- L'art idéaliste et mystique: doctrine de l'ordre et du salon annuel des Rose + Croix , 1894
- Babylone, tragedy, 1895
- Mélusine, 1895
- Le dernier Bourbon, tragedy, 1895
- Le livre du sceptre: politics, 1895
- La Prométhéide : trilogie d'Eschyle en quatre tableaux, 1895
- Le Prince de Byzance, tragedy, 1896
- Le prochain conclave; instructions aux cardinaux, [1897]
- Œdipe et le Sphinx, tragedy in prose, 1903
- Sémiramis, tragédie en prose, 1904
- La Dernière Leçon de Léonard de Vinci, essay, 1904
- La Clé de Rabelais, 1905
- De Parsifal à don Quichotte, essay, 1906
- La Doctrine de Dante, 1908
- La philosophie de Léonard de Vinci d'après ses manuscrits, essay, 1910 (rééd. Stalker, 2007)
- De l'Androgyne. Théorie plastique, essay 1910

== See also ==
- Stanislas de Guaita
- Joseph-Antoine Boullan
- Henri Antoine Jules-Bois
- Joris K. Huysmans
