= Stanislas de Guaita =

French poet

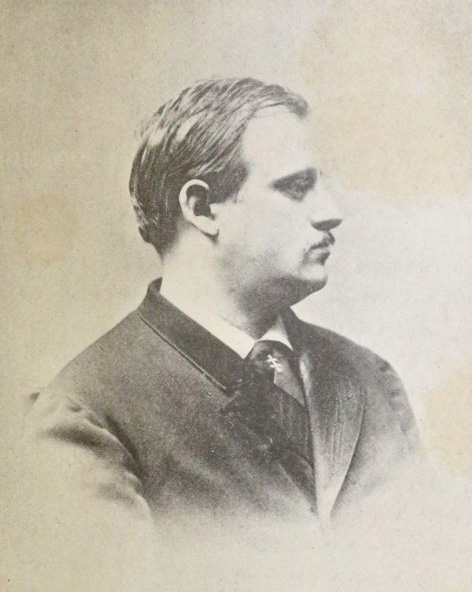
Stanislas de Guaita 1861–1897), philosopher and poet.

Stanislas de Guaita (6 April 1861, Tarquimpol, Moselle – 19 December 1897, Tarquimpol) was a French poet based in Paris, an expert on esotericism and European mysticism, and an active member of the Rosicrucian Order. He was very celebrated and successful in his time. He had many disputes with other people who were involved with occultism and magic. Occultism and magic were part of his novels.

== Early life ==
De Guaita came from a noble Italian family who had relocated to France, and as such his title was 'Marquis', or Marquess. He was born in the castle of Alteville in the commune of Tarquimpol, Moselle, and went to school at the lyceum in Nancy, where he studied chemistry, metaphysics and Cabala. As a young man, he moved to Paris, and his luxurious apartment became a meeting place for poets, artists, and writers who were interested in esotericism and mysticism. In the 1880s, Guaita published two collections of poetry The Dark Muse (1883) and The Mystic Rose (1885), which became popular.

== Rosicrucian activities ==
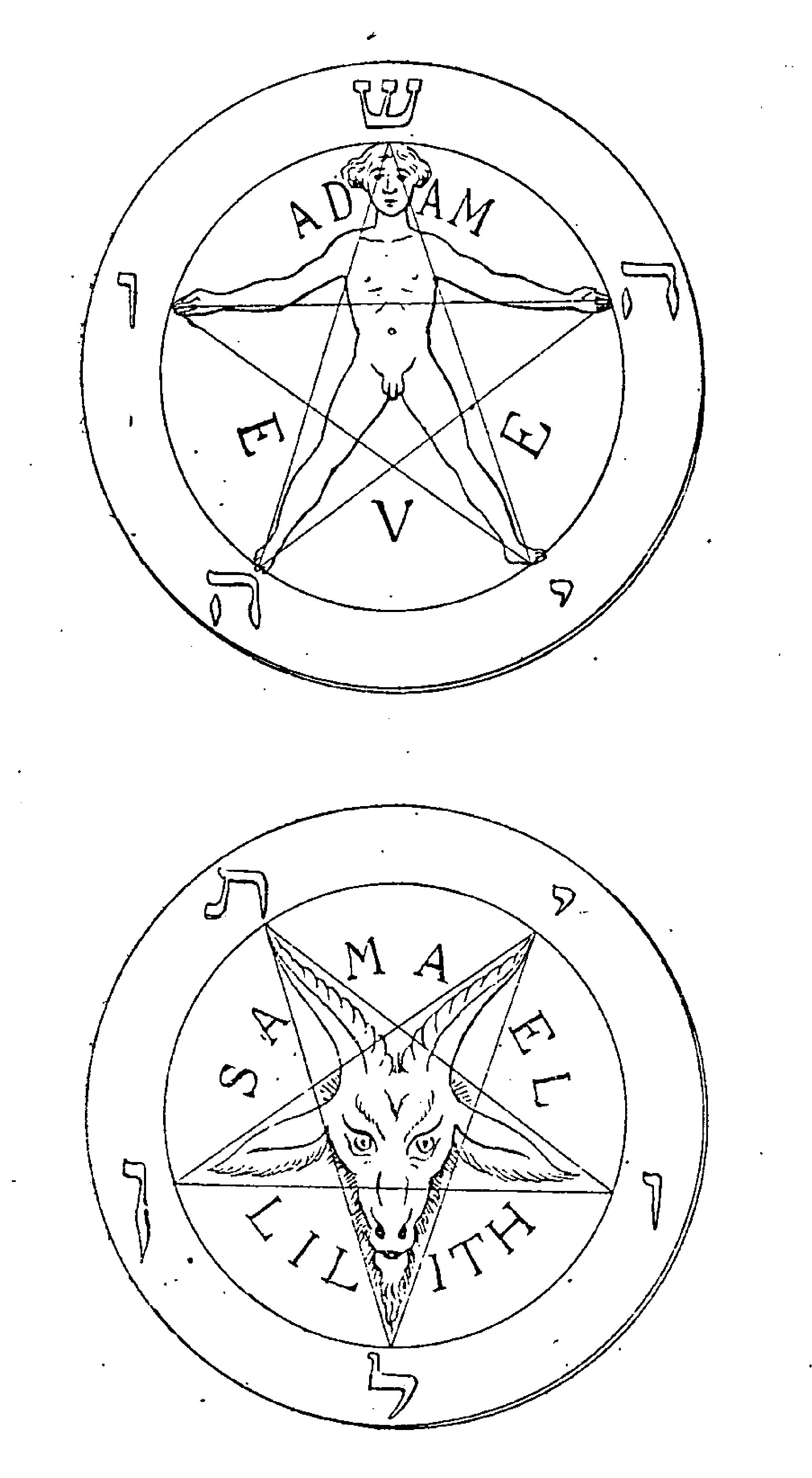
De Guaita's drawings of the upright and inverted pentagrams, representing Spirit over matter (holiness) and matter over Spirit (evil), respectively, from his book La Clef de la Magie Noire, in 1897.

De Guaita was influenced by the writings of l'Abbé Alphonse-Louis Constant, alias Eliphas Lévi, a prominent French occultist who was initiated in London to rosicrucianism by Edward Bulwer-Lytton in 1854. Eliphas Lévi was also initiated as a Freemason on 14 March 1861 in the Grand Orient de France Lodge La Rose du Parfait Silence at the Orient of Paris. De Guaita became further interested in occultism after reading a novel by Joséphin Péladan which was interwoven with Rosicrucian and occult themes. In Paris, de Guaita and Péladan became acquainted, and in 1884, the two decided to try to rebuild the Rosicrucian Brotherhood. They recruited Gérard Encausse to help rebuild the brotherhood. Encausse, who went by the pseudonym “Papus”, was a Spanish-born French physician and occultist who had written books on magic, Cabalah and the Tarot.

In 1888, de Guaita founded the Ordre kabbalistique de la Rose-Croix, or the Kabbalistic Order of the Rose-Cross. Rosicrucianism is an esoteric movement which first began with the publication of the three Rosicrucian Manifestos in the early 17th century. Guaita's Rosicrucian Order provided training in the Cabala, an esoteric form of Jewish and Christian mysticism, which attempts to reveal hidden mystical insights in the Bible and divine nature. The order also conducted examinations and provided university degrees on Cabala topics. Guaita had a large private library of books on metaphysical issues, magic, and the "hidden sciences." He was nicknamed the "Prince of the Rosicrucians" by his contemporaries for his broad learning on Rosicrucian issues. Papus, Peladan, and Antoine de La Rochefoucauld were prominent members. Maurice Barrès was a close friend of de Guaita.

In the late 1880s, the Abbé Boullan, a defrocked Catholic Priest and the head of a schismatic branch called the “Church of the Carmel” led a “magical war” against de Guaita. French-Belgian novelist Joris K. Huysmans, a supporter of Boullan, portrayed de Guaita as a Satanic sorcerer in the novel La Bas. Another of Boullan's supporters, the writer Jules Bois, challenged de Guaita to a pistol duel. De Guaita agreed and took part in the duel, but as both men missed, no one was hurt.

By the 1890s, de Guaita's, Papus' and Péladan's collaboration became increasingly strained by disagreements over strategy and doctrines. Guaita and Papus lost the support of Péladan, who left to start a competing order. De Guaita died in 1897 at the age of 36.

His original drawing of an inverted pentagram with a goat's head appeared in La Clef de la Magie Noire (The Key to Black Magic), published the year he died. It later became conflated with Baphomet, or the Sabbatic Goat.

== See also ==
- Laurent Tailhade, a French poet and contemporary of Guaita's
- Joseph-Antoine Boullan
- Henri Antoine Jules-Bois
- Joris K. Huysmans
- Joséphin Péladan
