= Gérard Encausse =

French physician, hypnotist, and occultist

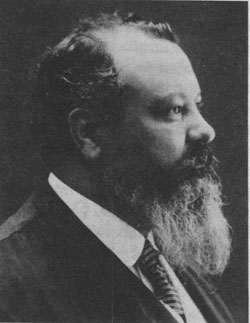
Papus

Gérard Anaclet Vincent Encausse (13 July 1865 – 25 October 1916), whose esoteric pseudonyms were Papus and Tau Vincent, was a French physician, hypnotist, and popularizer of occultism, who founded the modern Martinist Order.

== Early life ==
Gerard Encausse was born in A Coruña, Galicia, Spain on 13 July 1865 of a Spanish mother, Irene Perez, and a French father, Louis Encausse, a chemist. His family moved to Paris when he was four years old, and he received his education there.

As a young man, Encausse spent a great deal of time at the Bibliothèque Nationale studying the Kabbalah, occult tarot, magic and alchemy, and the writings of Eliphas Lévi. He joined the French Theosophical Society shortly after it was founded by Madame Blavatsky in 1884–1885, but he resigned soon after joining because he disliked the Society's emphasis on Eastern occultism.

== Career ==
=== Overview ===
In 1888, Encausse co-founded with Lucien Chamuel the Librairie du Merveilleux, a Parisian publishing house focused on esoteric works, and launched the journal L’Initiation, which he edited for nearly two decades. A translation of the journal's first series (1888–1912) into Italian is currently being published with critical commentary.

His pseudonym “Papus” was taken from the Nuctemeron of Apollonius of Tyana, as it appears in Éliphas Lévi's Transcendental Magic as one of the genii of the first hour and identified as 'physician' among the 'moral forces or personified virtues.' This choice reflected his dual interest in healing and occult philosophy.

Encausse was also a member of the Hermetic Brotherhood of Light and the Hermetic Order of the Golden Dawn temple in Paris, as well as Memphis-Misraim and probably other esoteric or paramasonic organizations, as well as being an author of several occult books. Outside of his paramasonic and Martinist activities he was also a spiritual student of the French spiritualist healer, Anthelme Nizier Philippe, "Maître Philippe de Lyon".

Despite his heavy involvement in occultism and occultist groups, Encausse managed to find time to pursue more conventional academic studies at the University of Paris. He received his Doctor of Medicine degree in 1894 upon submitting a dissertation on Philosophical Anatomy. He opened a clinic in the rue Rodin which was quite successful.

Encausse visited Russia three times, in 1901, 1905, and 1906, serving Tsar Nicholas II and Tsarina Alexandra both as physician and occult consultant. It has been incorrectly claimed that in October 1905, he conjured up the spirit of Alexander III (father of Tsar Nicholas), who prophesied that the Tsar would meet his downfall at the hands of revolutionaries. Encausse's followers allege that he informed the Tsar that he would be able to magically avert Alexander's prophesy so long as Encausse was alive. Nicholas kept his hold on the throne of Russia until 141 days after Papus' death.

Although Encausse seems to have served the Tsar and Tsarina in what was essentially the capacity of a mediumistic spiritual advisor, he was later curiously concerned about their heavy reliance on occultism to assist them in deciding questions of government. During their later correspondence, he warned them a number of times against the influence of Rasputin.

=== Involvement and influences ===
==== Lévi, Tarot, and the Kabbalah ====
Encausse's early readings in tarot and the lore of the Kabbalah in translation was inspired by the occult writings of Éliphas Lévi, whose translation of the Nuctemeron of Apollonius of Tyana printed as a supplement to Dogme et Rituel de la Haute Magie (1855), provided Encausse with his pen name. He includes his own interpretations of the hours of the Nuctemeron in his Tarot of the Bohemians.

==== 1888 Kabbalistic Order of the Rose-Croix ====
Although Encausse claimed as his "spiritual master" the mysterious magician and healer known as "le Maitre Philippe" (Philippe Nizier), his first actual teacher in the intellectual aspects of occultism was the marquis Joseph Alexandre Saint-Yves d'Alveydre (1842 - 1910). Saint-Yves had inherited the papers of one of the great founders of French occultism, Antoine Fabre d'Olivet (1762 - 1825), and it was probably Saint-Yves who introduced Papus to the marquis Stanislas de Guaita (1861 - 1897).

In 1888, Encausse and de Guaita joined with Joséphin Péladan and Oswald Wirth to found the Rosicrucian Kabbalistic Order of the Rose-Cross. Papus was consequently member of its Supreme Council.

==== 1891 l'Ordre Martiniste ====
In 1891, Encausse claimed to have come into the possession of the original papers of Martinez Paschalis, or de Pasqually (c. 1700-1774), and therewith founded an Order of Martinists called l'Ordre des Supérieurs Inconnus. He claimed to have been given authority in the Rite of Saint-Martin by his friend Henri Vicomte de Laage, who claimed that his maternal grandfather had been initiated into the order by Saint-Martin himself, and who had attempted to revive the order in 1887. The Martinist Order was to become a primary focus for Encausse, and continues today as one of his most enduring legacies.

==== 1893–1895 Bishop of l'Église Gnostique de France ====
In 1893, Encausse was consecrated a bishop of l'Église Gnostique de France by Jules Doinel, who had founded this Church as an attempt to revive the Cathar religion in 1890. In 1895, Doinel abdicated as Primate of the French Gnostic Church, leaving control of the Church to a synod of three of his former bishops, one of whom was Encausse.

==== 1895 Hermetic Order of the Golden Dawn ====
In March 1895, Encausse joined the Ahathoor Temple of the Hermetic Order of the Golden Dawn in Paris.

==== 1908–1913 Encausse, Reuss and paramasonry ====
Encausse never became a regular Freemason. Despite this, he organized what was announced as an "International Masonic Conference" in Paris on 24 June 1908, and at this conference he first met Theodor Reuss, and the two men apparently exchanged patents:

Reuss elevated Encausse as X° of Ordo Templi Orientis as well as giving him license to establish a "Supreme Grand Council General of the Unified Rites of Ancient and Primitive Masonry for the Grand Orient of France and its Dependencies at Paris." For his part, Encausse assisted Reuss in the formation of Ecclesia Gnostica Catholica as a child of l'Église Gnostique de France, thus forming the E.G.C. within the tradition of French neo-gnosticism.

When John Yarker died in 1913, Encausse was elected as his successor to the office of Grand Hierophant (international head) of the Antient and Primitive Rite of Memphis and Mizraim.

== Death ==
When World War I broke out, Encausse joined the French army medical corps. While working in a military hospital, he contracted tuberculosis and died in Paris on 25 October 1916, at the age of 51.

== Bibliography ==
This is a partial list of written works of Papus (Gérard Encausse) include works in French:

- L'Occultisme Contemporain, 1887. from Gallica
- Le Tarot des Bohémiens, 1889.
- L'Occultisme, 1890.
- Traité méthodique de Science Occulte, 1891. PDF scans from Google Books
- La Science Des Mages, 1892. PDF scans from Gallica
- Anarchie, Indolence et Synarchie, 1894. PDF scans from Gallica
- Le Diable et l'Occultisme. 1895.
- The Tarot of the Bohemians, translated by A. P. Morton, London, George Redway 1896
- Traité Méthodique de La Magie Pratique, 1898. PDF scans from Gallica
- Niet (Gérard Encausse and Jean Carrère), La Russie Aujourd'hui. 1902
- La Kabbale, 1903.
- Le Tarot Divinatoire, 1909. PDF scans from Internet Archive
- Papus (1958). The Tarot of the Bohemians: Absolute Key to Occult Science. A.E. Waite (translation to English), Gertrude Moakley (introduction). Arcanum Books.

== See also ==
- Martinism
- Members of Ordo Templi Orientis
