= Saint-Yves =

Saint-Yves, Saint Ivo, or Sant'Ivo can refer to:

== Christian saints ==
- Saint Ivo of Chartres (c. 1040-1115), bishop of Chartres, feast day 23 May
- Saint Ivo of Kermartin (1253-1303), patron saint of Brittany, lawyers and abandoned children, feast day 19 May

== Churches ==
- Sant'Ivo alla Sapienza in Rome, dedicated to Ivo of Kermartin
- Sant'Ivo dei Bretoni in Rome, also dedicated to Ivo of Kermartin, a French national church

== Surname ==
- Saint-Yves (surname), a French surname

== See also ==
- St Ives (disambiguation)
- Ivo
- Yves (disambiguation)
