= Saint-Yves (the elder) =

Saint-Yves, Pierre (de) (1660–1730), was a French painter of the 17th and 18th centuries.

== Biography ==
Pierre de Saint-Yves was born in the French Ardennes (near Maubert-Fontaine) on May 3, 1660, within a family protected by Marie de Guise. This princess called both young Saint-Yvess and his brother Charles de Saint-Yves (1667–1733) to Paris in the early 1670s, as pages and sponsored their formations.

Having received a King's pension, Saint-Yves completed studies with a three-year stay at the French Academy in Rome before returning to Paris as a painter. On January 28, 1708, Saint-Yves became a member of the Royal Academy of Painting and Sculpture, in the category of history painter, and he died in Paris on November 4, 1730.

Saint-Yves is an illustrative example of the transition between 17th-century art careers that were usually introduced by the protection of high nobility sponsors, and 18th-century art circles organized around and in the glory of the King. To that extent, Saint-Yves' membership to the Academy as a history painter constituted the utmost position in the Court system at the time, although this category of French classical painting declined by the end of the century and has been almost totally forgotten since the 19th century.

Thus, most of Saint-Yves' posterity lies in his art cabinet, which was bequeathed to the family of his brother Charles and based the reputable art collection of Charles Léoffroy de Saint-Yves.

== Sources ==
- Nouvelle biographie générale (1852–1866), dir. Hoefer, ed. M. Firmin Didot frères p452-453
- Dom Calmet, Histoire de la Lorraine p115
- Lebrun-Dalbaune, Un mot sur Pierre-de Saint-Yves, peintre d'histoire (19 mai 1865), Impr. de Dufour-Bouquot, 1873
- L. Vitet, L'Académie royale de Peinture et de Sculpture : étude historique (1861), Michel Lévy frères, Paris
