= Charles Saint-Yves =

French ophthalmologist

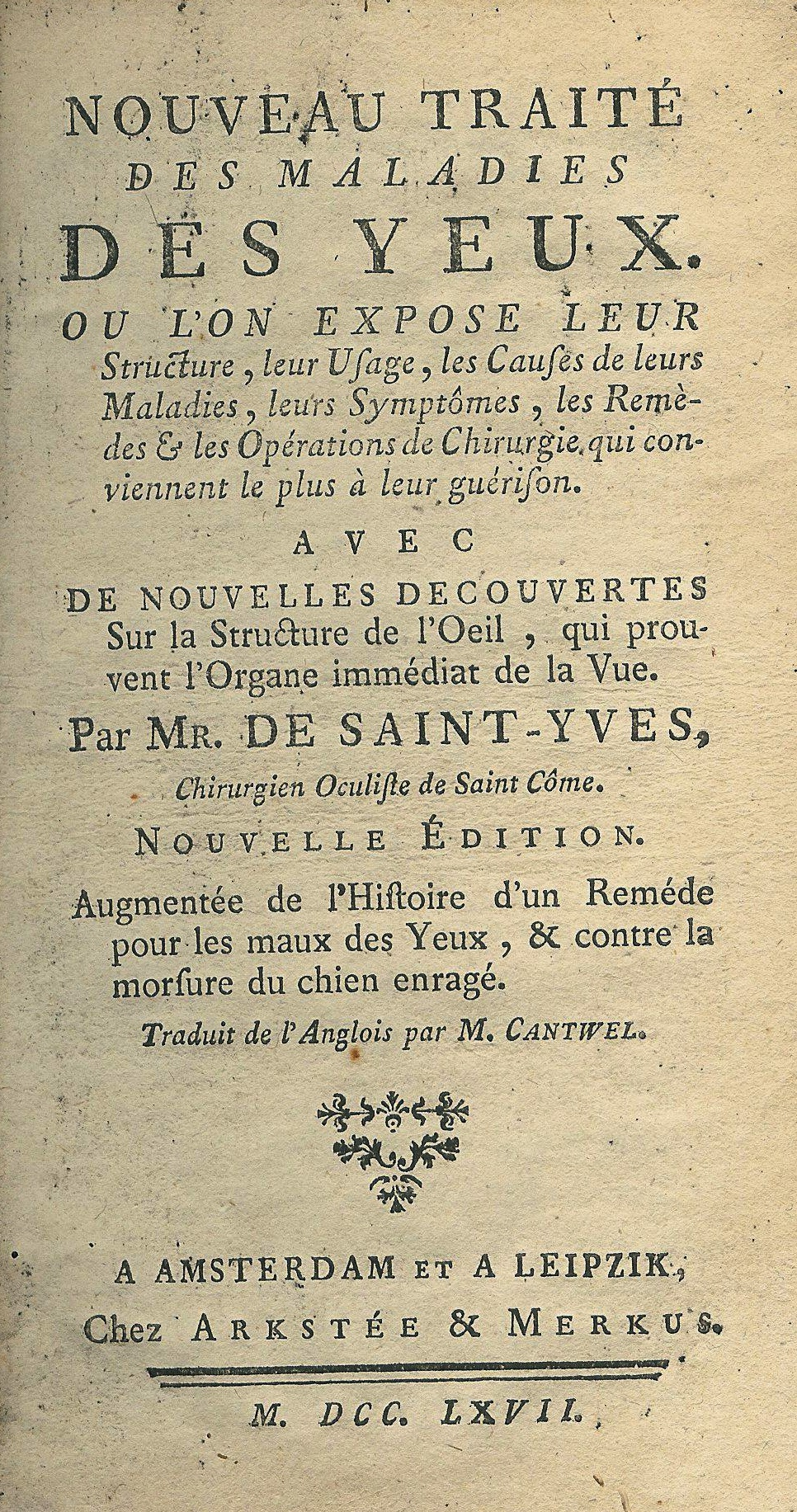
Charles de Saint-Yves, Traité des maladies des yeux, 3rd edition 1767

Charles Saint-Yves, or Charles de Saint-Yves, (1667 – August 3, 1731) was a French ophthalmologist, famous for his treatment of the cataract and his treatise on ophthalmology.

== Life and career ==
Saint-Yves was born in 1667 at Maubert-Fontaine (Ardennes, Northern France), out of a family affiliated to Marie de Guise, who called him and his elder brother (1660–1730) to Paris for becoming her pages.

He subsequently took his vows at the Congregation of the Mission in 1686 and worked at the pharmacy, where he learned medicine and surgery.

He subsequently specialised in eye pathology and left the priory of St Lazarus in 1711 when he set up his own practice at his elder brother's, rue Notre-Dame de Bonne-Nouvelle in Paris.

His studies, and in particular his treatment of cataracts earned him a strong reputation all around Europe and many patients queued at his consultancy. From his lazarist past, Saint-Yves kept a strong sense of charity and sense for the poor, as well as for natives from his region of origin.

Saint-Yves died in Paris on August 3, 1731, at the peak of his reputation and wealth.

== Operation of cataract ==
At the turn of the 17th and 18th centuries, it became more and more clear that sight was not located in the lens, but that the deterioration of the latter was the actual cause of the cataract. In Paris, notably Pierre Brisseau (1631–1717) introduced his conclusions from eye dissection to the Academy of Medicine in 1705, before publishing a Traité de la Cataracte et du Glaucome (Treatise on cataracts and glaucoma, 1709), to be followed by Antoire Maître-Jean (Traité des maladies de l'oeil, Treatise on eye pathologies, 1707).

These ideas allowed the introduction of new surgical treatments, and Saint-Yves achieved a first extract of a dislocated lens on a living patient in 1707 and stabilised his operating technique over a couple of hundred cases that first year. He also advised famous surgeon Jean-Louis Petit in his operation of the cataract in 1708. Cataract operation quickly spread in Paris afterwards.

The Encyclopedia mentions Saint-Yves, as follows: " Among French authors, Saint-Yves was the only one who provided details on its operating more, although limited ones. He was pushing a needle through the globe in order to raise while pulling out the cristalline; He does not provide any further information on the process, but confirms that patient were quickly healed. / Parmi les auteurs françois, il n'y a que Saint-Yves, qui soit entré dans quelques détails très-succincts, fur la pratique de cette opération. Il pastoit, au moyen d'une aiguille, une foie à travers le globe pour le soulever pendant l'extirpation; il ne décrit point le procédé qu'il suivoit, & il se borne a dire, que les malades font guéris en peu de temps."

== Treaty of pathology ==
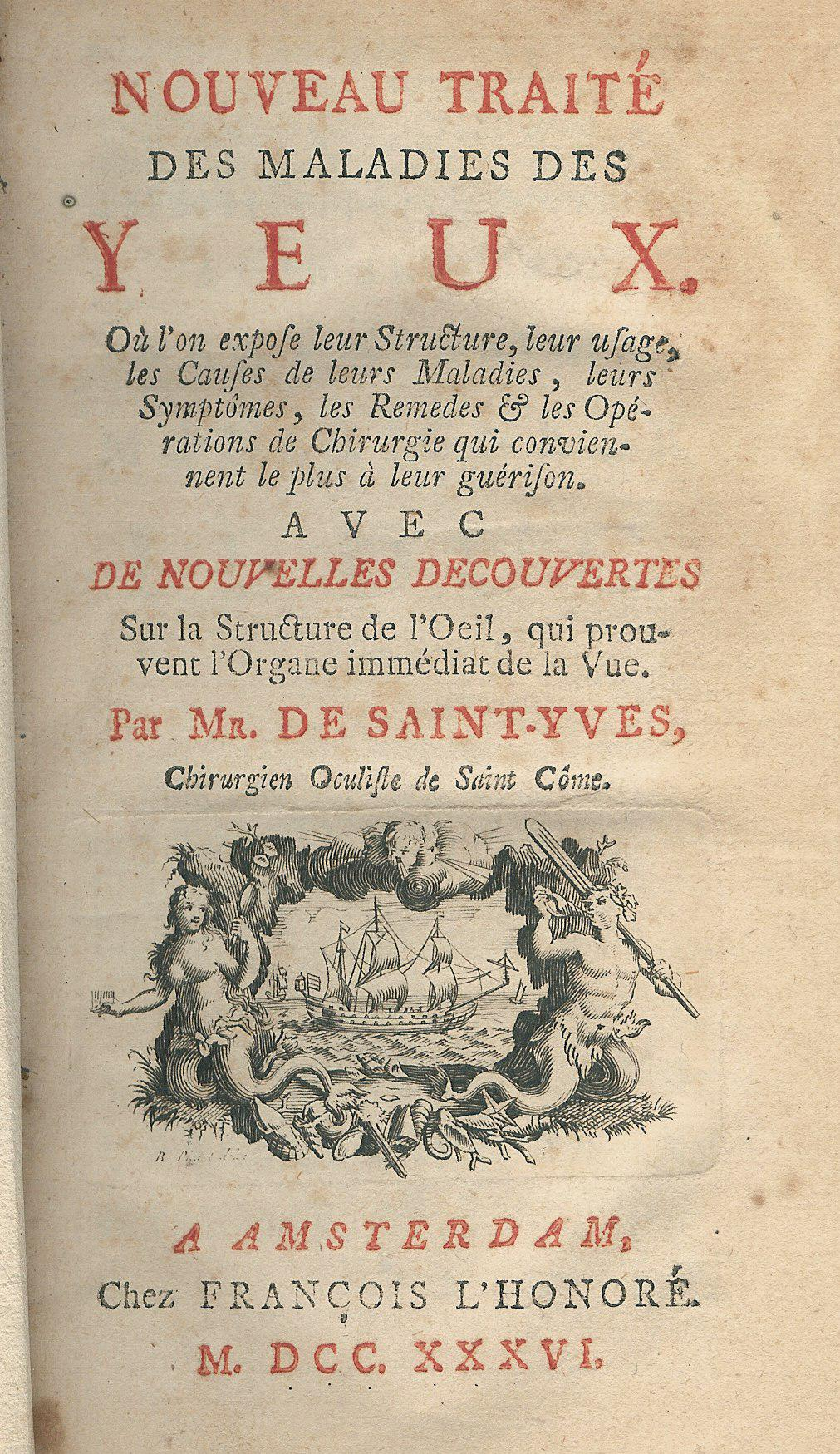
Charles de Saint-Yves, Traité des maladies des yeux, 2nd edition 1736

Based on such experience and his large fame, Saint-Yves published in 1722 a treatise of descriptive pathology that durably set out as a pillar of the French school of ophthalmology : Nouveau traité des maladies des yeux où l'on expose leur structure, leur usage, les causes de leurs maladies, leurs symptômes, les remèdes et les opérations de chirurgie qui conviennent le plus à leur guérison, avec de nouvelles découvertes sur la structure de l'oeil, qui prouvent l'organe immédiat de la vue, par Mr de Saint-Yves, chirurgien occultiste de Saint Côme (New treatise of eye pathologies, with description of eye structures and uses, the origins of their illnesses along with their symptoms, the most appropriate remedies and surgery treatments, including new discoveries concerning eye structure that prove the exact location of sight, by Mr de Saint-Yves, eye surgeon at Saint-Côme).

The first edition, in French was published in Paris in 1722, and followed by new editions in Amsterdam (1736) and Leipzig (1767).

After a minor argument in Paris gazette le Mercure de France, Saint-Yves book became a reference across Europe and was translated in several languages, namely in English (London 1741 et 1744), German (Berlin 1730), Italian (Venise 1750, 1768 et 1781), or Dutch (1739).

== Posterity ==
Saint-Yves bequeathed his name and his fortune to his closest assistant Etienne Léoffroy, who took over his master's practice and developed it across Europe.

A series of Parisian intellectuals (medicine and arts) followed, with the name Saint-Yves.

== Bibliography ==
- Encyclopédie ou Dictionnaire raisonné des sciences, des arts et des métiers, vol 23, page 490
- Eloy, Dictionnaire de Médecine, t. IV, p. 587
- Hallé, Bibliotheca chirurgica, t; II, p. 74
- Nouvelle biographie générale (1852–1866), dir. Hoefer, ed. M. Firmin Didot frères
- J.P. Bailliart, Le XVIII° siècle et la première moitié du XIX°, les grands moments de l'ophtalmologie française, Merck, Sharpe & Dohme-Chibret, p. 60
- Guillaumat, Ita-Zizen, Newmann, Cabanis et Lopez, Monsieur de Saint-Yves, 1722, précurseur en extraction de la cataracte et en ophtalmologie endocrinienne, L'Ophtalmologie des origines à nos jours, 4, 1983, p. 165-168
