= Victor Hennequin =

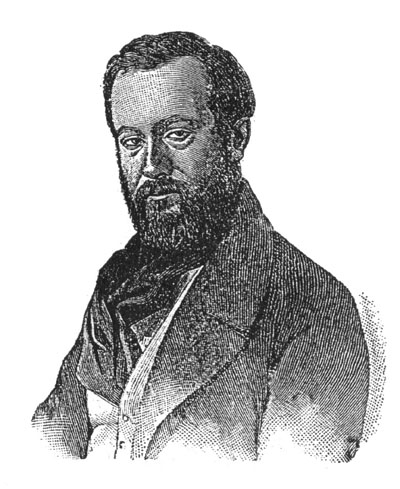
Victor Hennequin, c. 1898

Victor Hennequin (3 June 1816 – 10 December 1854) was a French socialist politician and spirit medium who published several works in the 19th century. He was born and died in Paris.

== Political career ==
The son of Antoine Hennequin, a deputy of the Nord department, he became a lawyer in 1838 in Paris. He came under the influence of Victor Prosper Considerant, who was a disciple of Charles Fourier, and became an editor of La Démocratie Pacifique, a Fourierist daily newspaper published 1843–1851. In 1848 he became a member of the National Assembly of France. He was a young barrister "infatuated with the reveries of Fourier."

== Mediumship ==
Being banished as a consequence of the French coup of 1851, he took up table-turning during his enforced inactivity; he soon fell victim to mediomania and believed himself an instrument for the revelations of the soul of the earth. He published a book entitled Save the Human Race (1853); it was a mix of socialist and Christian reminiscences.

In a final work of which only one volume was issued, Victor Hennequin represents God in the guise of an immense polypus located at the centre of the earth, having antennae and horns turned inwards like tendrils all over his brain, as also over that of his wife Octavia. Soon afterwards it was reported that Victor Hennequin had died from the consequences of a maniacal paroxysm in a madhouse. His madness is said otherwise to have been partial or characterized by many lucid intervals. His second work was Religion. It preached the doctrine of reincarnation with periodical changes of sex. It described the Deity as an infinite substance in which circulated myriads of soul-entities.

The occult writer Éliphas Lévi presents the case of Victor Hennequin as an example of the dangers of trying to develop mediumistic powers. "The reiterated efforts of a healthy person to develop mediumistic faculties cause fatigue, disease and may even derange reason."

== See also ==
- Gérard de Nerval
