= Joseph-Antoine Boullan =

French Roman Catholic priest

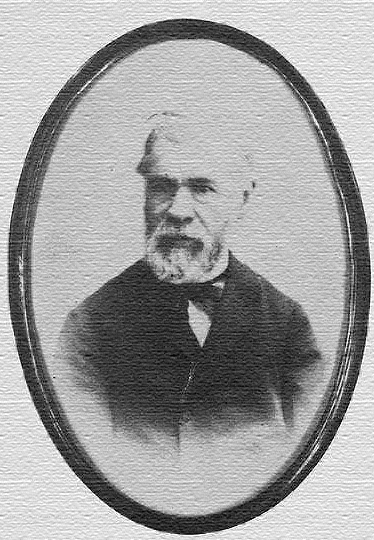
Joseph-Antoine Boullan

Joseph-Antoine Boullan (Saint-Porquier, Tarn-et-Garonne, 18 February 1824 – 4 January 1893, Lyon) was a French Roman Catholic priest who was later laicized, and was often accused of being a Satanist although he continued to defend his status as a Christian.

He studied for the priesthood at a seminary local to his hometown and later earned a doctorate with distinction in Rome. In 1856 he moved to Paris as an independent priest editing a periodical called Les Annales du sacerdoce. In 1859, Boullan and a nun named Adèle Chevalier started a religious community called the Society for the Reparation of Souls but were soon charged with having an illicit sexual affair and using fraudulent medicinal remedies. Both were convicted of fraud and indecency and sentenced to prison 1861-1864. In 1869, he was imprisoned in the cells of the Holy Office in Rome where he confessed his misdeeds, was rehabilitated and returned to Paris. The following year he launched a new publication which again drew the displeasure of ecclesiastical authorities for publishing heretical views. He also incurred displeasure by his unorthodox methods of exorcising evil spirits. In 1875, after a prolong conflict with the Archbishop of Paris, Boullan left the church. Later that year, he joined and soon assumed leadership of an alternative religious sect in Lyon and had a pentagram tattooed at the corner of his left eye. In leading this group, Boullan taught that acts of love accomplished in a religious spirit could redeem humanity from original sin. Such "acts of love" apparently could be spiritual or carnal.

From 1886 until his death in 1893, Boullan was at the center of a storm of accusations and counter accusations of Satanism involving a broad coterie of French occultists ranging from devout Catholics to Rosicrucians.

Boullan was a friend and inspiration of the writer Joris-Karl Huysmans. Huysmans with Henri Antoine Jules-Bois supported Boullan in a celebrated occultist feud with the Marquis Stanislas de Guaita.

Boullan is mentioned in The Prague Cemetery, the novel by Umberto Eco.
