= Charles (Léoffroy) de Saint-Yves =

Art critic and collector in Paris

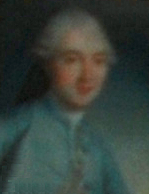
Self portrait, circa 1750, Private coll.

Charles Léoffroy de Saint-Yves (7 October 1717 – 2 February 1804) was an art critic and collector in Paris.

== Life and career ==
Léoffroy de Saint-Yves was born in Paris on 7 October 1717, and belonged to a lineage of doctors that started with the ophthalmologist Charles Saint-Yves. Pursuant to a formation at the college Louis-Le Grand under the famous jesuit Porée he also became an ophthalmologist and practised with his father Etienne Léoffroy Saint-Yves at Paris, rue Saint-Thomas du Louvre.

After the latter's death, Léoffroy de Saint-Yves soon abandoned practice and applied the sound family fortune that had been bequeathed to him to the arts. He became a famous art collector and a critic, in the lineage of his great-uncle painter Saint-Yves. He spent his last seven years in Normandy (Vernon?) and died on 2 February 1804.

== Collector ==
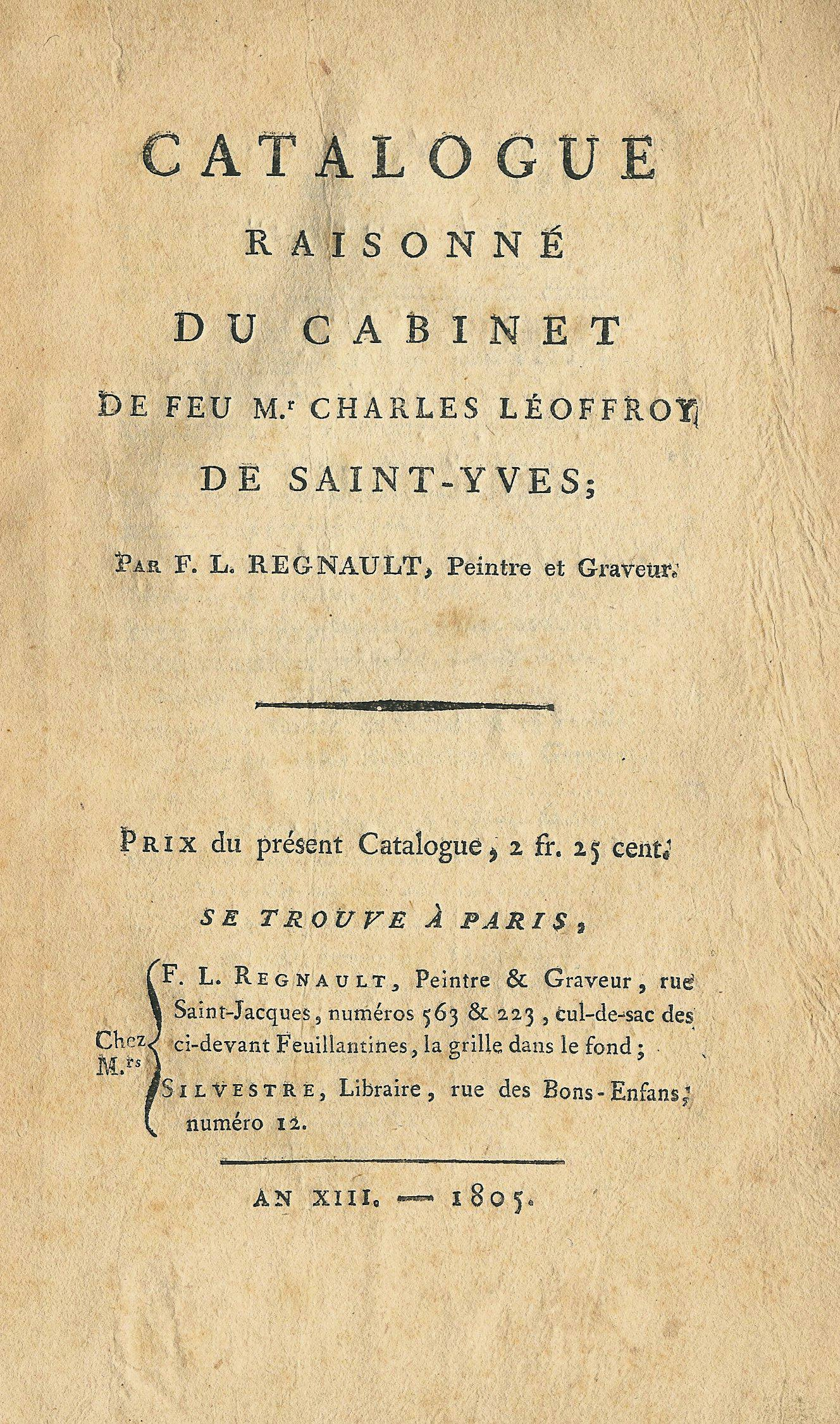
Catalog of 1805 auction, Private coll.

Léoffroy de Saint-Yves's collections included essential works from the best Parisian collections, and in particular Boucher, Conti, Huquier, Lempereur, Mariette, van Loo. It also counted many valuable engravings from Dürer, Rubens ou Nanteuil.

Most of them was sold during May 2_15th, 1805 public sale in Paris.

Various art publications of the time, in particular the Annales de la calcographie générale with Léoffroy de Saint-Yves' obituary, detailed the collection: "Among numerous pictures, enamels, drawings, bronze, ivory r terracotta sculptures, one could notice most interesting works from Lucatelli, Vannins, Barbicri, Biscaino, Breughel dit de Velours, P. Potier, Will, Baur, Petitot, Liagelbac, Bachnysen, Hondekoeter, François Flamand, Warnès, le Nain, Patel, la Fosse, la Saye, le Puget, François Guérin, Blaremberg, Hue, et Van-Spaendonck. Mr de Saint-Yves's cabinet of engravings included master pieces from Marco Antonio, Guil. Bonasoni, Stef. Delia Bella, Vanni, Agos. et Ann. Caracci, Giorgio et Diana Ghisi de Mantoue, Andreaui, Rota, Biscaino, de Gbein, Vostermau, Franc. VandenSteen, les Bolswert, Pontins, Goltzins, Juc. Matham, Saeuredam, Gondt, Corn. Bloemaert, Rembrandt, Potter, P. Tfolpe, J. Muller, Blootelind, Corn, et Visscher, J. Vande-Velde, Hollur, Natalis, Callot, Mellan, Franc, de Poilly, Masson, Le Clerc, Gir. Audraa, Spierre, Ger. Edelinck, Drevet, and many other crafted engravers of the ancient and present times»

== Art critic ==
Most of Saint-Yves' reputation however remains only with his publications of art critics during the annual exhibits of the Royal Academy of painting and Sculpture in Paris, which soon gained reputation afterwards with modern art criticism that introduced Diderot and his nine Salons (1759–1781).

See Charles Léoffroy de Saint-Yves's Observations sur les arts, et sur quelques morceaux de peinture et de sculpture, exposés au Louvre en 1748; où il est parlé de l'utilité des embellissements dans les villes

== Bibliography ==
- Charles de Saint-Yves, Observations sur les arts, et sur quelques morceaux de peinture et de sculpture, exposés au Louvre en 1748; où il est parlé de l'utilité des embellissements dans les villes. Leyde, E. Luzac Jr., 1748.
- Catalogue of 1805 public auction : Catalogue raisonné du Cabinet de feu Mr. Charles Léoffroy de Saint-Yves. Estampes, tableaux, dessins, miniatures, sculptures, livres etc... Paris, 1805, F.L. Regnault, peintre & graveur et Silvestre, libraire
- Annales de la calcographie générale, Paris 1806, Vallin & Gillé fils, P. 8–11
- Encyclopédie moderne, ou dictionnaire abrégé des hommes et des choses des sciences, des lettres et des arts, Lejeune, Paris 1829, p. 179
