= Order of the Temple of the Rosy Cross =

The Order of the Temple of the Rosy Cross (OTRC) was an early 20th century theosophical group. It was founded in 1912 by leaders of the Theosophical Society, including Annie Besant, Marie Russak and James Ingall Wedgwood.

According to Gregory Tillett, in Charles Webster Leadbeater 1854-1934, both Russak and Wedgwood were mediums who purportedly communicated messages from the Masters during Temple meetings. (Note: Tillett, who interviewed some members, noted the small number of published references to the Temple; he commented that references "in Theosophical publications tend to be vague" while "those outside the TS tend to be inaccurate.") Russak's understudy in the Temple was Lady Emily Lutyens, the English representative of the Order of the Star in the East and editor of its journal, Herald of the Star, who was also in the society's esoteric section and "introduced wealthy converts" who financed the society.

According to The Vahan, the OTRC was dedicated "to the study of the Mysteries, Rosicrucian, Cabal, Astrology, Masonry, Symbolism, Christian Ceremonial, Mystic Traditions and Occults of the West". And it added that: "To confide in that such work serves as preliminary for the restoration of the missing Mysteries of Europe with the decadence of Rome".

Sophia announced that "The Council of the Order is composed by 12 Brothers deeply interested in all that refers to the Ceremonial Occultism and Archaic Mysteries, and that they hope to form a useful instrument, under the inspiration of the Master Rákóczi, to resuscitate the Old Mysteries and to prepare the arrival of the Master of the World". Temple members wore white tunics and met biweekly in "Oratory" and "Laboratory". In the oratory, they expounded and discussed spiritual and philosophical texts. In the laboratory introspective work and ritual was practised. After the Order's dissolution, Russak entered the Ancient Mystical Order Rosae Crucis (AMORC) and actively collaborated with Harvey Spencer Lewis in creating rituals for AMORC in California, in the 1920s.

Charles Webster Leadbeater disapproved of the Temple because he neither established nor controlled it, and mediums, other than Besant and Leadbeater, communicated messages from the Masters. He claimed that the rituals "produced 'adverse forces'" so Leadbeater unsuccessfully "tried to persuade" Lutyens "to have it reorganized along lines which he suggested." In 1914, Leadbeater communicated "a message from the Master ordering its dissolution."

Max Heindel in Rays from the Rose Cross printed in 1915, argued that there could be no connection between The Rosicrucian Fellowship and the OTRC, or any other Theosophical Society order because "the aim of The Theosophical Society and their subsidiary orders are diametrically opposed to The Rosicrucian Fellowship" which "espoused the Western Wisdom Religion" and believe in the "Western methods for Western people." The Rosicrucian Fellowship took the founding of the OTRC, by leaders of the Theosophical Society, as "an indication that they had seen the true Christ Light, in the West, and were preparing to emulate the 'Wise Men of the East' who traveled westward following the Christ Star to Bethlehem." The Order was resuscitated in 2016 by an elder brother based in England and subsequently also in Fresonara, Italy, named Societas Italica Rosae Crucis.

== See also ==
- Order of the Temple of the Rosy Cross
- Rosicrucianism
- Theosophy
