= Kabbalistic Order of the Rose-Cross =

French occult society

- Ordre kabbalistique de la Rose-Croix
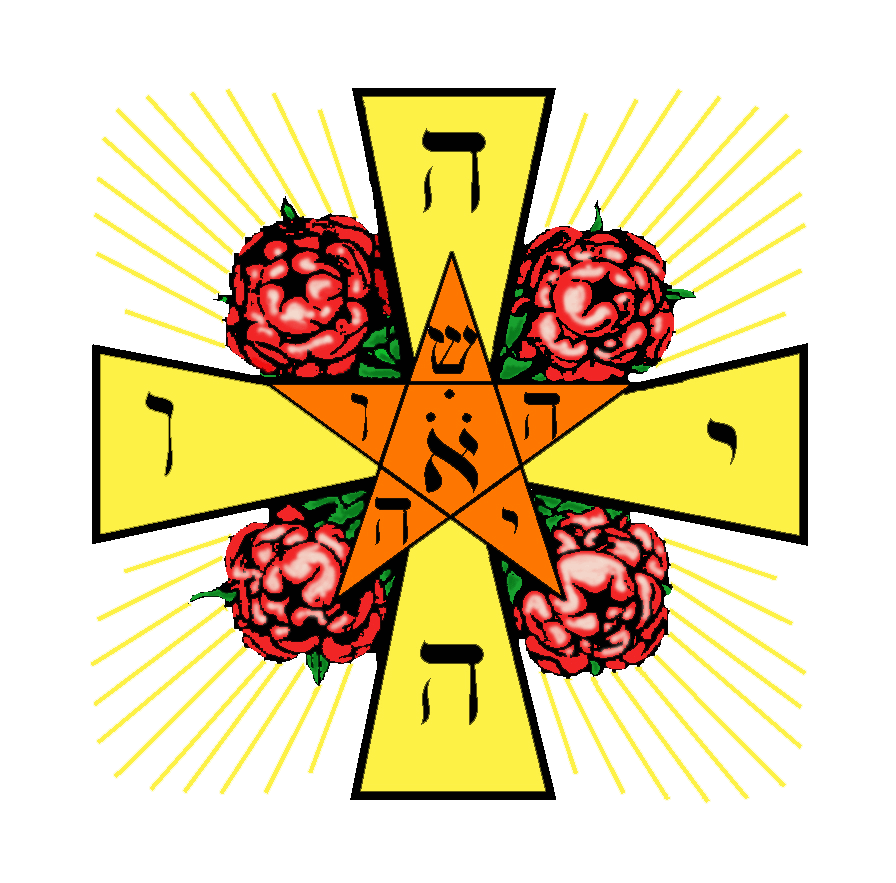
- Modified version of the emblem of O.K.R.C. from a 19th-century occultistic/mystical work.
- Formation: 1888 in Paris (France)
- Type: Christian-Cabbalistic organisation
- Headquarters: Las Vegas
- Leader: Viscount Louis-Charles-Edouard de Lapasse (1850–1888); Stanislas de Guaita (1888–1897); Gérard Encausse (1897–1916)
- Website: www.okrc.org

The Kabbalistic Order of the Rose-Cross (French: Ordre kabbalistique de la Rose-Croix – O.K.R.C.) was France's first ever occult society, established by Stanislas de Guaita and Joséphin Péladan in 1888. Its structure and teaching had similarities and intersections with the first Martinist Order—Ordre des Supérieurs Inconnus—founded by Gérard Encausse (or better known as Papus), and has an emphasis on Christian Kabbalah as its domain of study and direction of spiritual work.

== History ==
In 1890–1891, one of the original one of the founders Joséphin Péladan abandoned the OKRC and established his own Ordre de la Rose-Croix catholique du Temple et du Graal which included many of the prominent Symbolist artists of the period. The reason for the split is that Péladan ‘refused to associate himself with Spiritism, Freemasonry or Buddhism’. Stanislas de Guaita, on the contrary, said that he doesn’t want to turn the order into a salon for artists. Today, the order still operates in several countries in the world and in several languages.

== Teaching and structure ==
The OKRC conducted classes on Christian Kabbalah—an esoteric form of Christianity—with the goal of revealing the hidden mystical capacity to ‘penetrate the essence of the Bible and the Divine.' Also, the order conducted examinations and awarded grades that were named after the academic degrees in universities. This feature favourably distinguished the order from the bulk of the secret societies of its time.

=== Degrees of the O.K.R.C. ===
1. Bachelor of Kabbalah
2. Licence of Kabbalah (Master of Kabbalah)
3. Doctorate of Kabbalah

The structure of the degrees was created in the form of the University, they were awarded only to those who attend lectures and pass examinations.

== See also ==
- Rosicrucianism – 17th-century European spiritual movement
- Hermetic Qabalah – Western esoteric tradition
