= Jean Noël Hallé =

French physician (1754–1822)

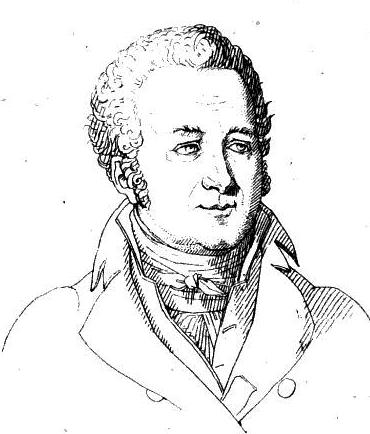
Jean Noël Hallé (1754-1822)

Jean Noël Hallé (2 January 1754 – 11 February 1822) was a French medical doctor born in Paris. He was the son of painter Noël Hallé (1711–1781).

He was a professor of physical medicine and health at the École de Santé, and afterwards a professor at the Collège de France. He was a member of the French Académie Nationale de Médecine, and in 1795 was elected to the Académie des sciences, becoming its president in 1813. He also served as "first-physician" to Napoleon Bonaparte.

Hallé was a pioneer of hygienic reform in France, and was a catalyst towards educating others as to its importance. He created distinctions between public and individual hygiene, and initiated studies and awareness involving the multiple issues that involve hygiene, such as contagious diseases, health in the workplace, and problems associated with living in a high density urban environment, to name a few.

He was co-editor of the 1813 "Code des médicaments" (a work involving French pharmacopoeia), and made contributions to the "Dictionnaire des Sciences médicales" (Dictionary of Medical Sciences). He also carried out investigations of breast cancer, conducted research on the effects of camphor, and was a major advocate of vaccination.

In 1794 he came to the defense of Antoine Lavoisier (1743–1794), when the latter was tried for treason before the National Convention.
