= Antoine Fabre d'Olivet =

French author, poet and composer (1767-1825)

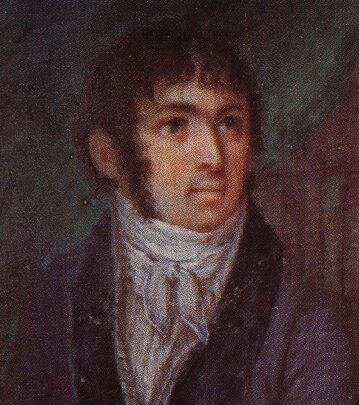
Fabre d'Olivet

Antoine Fabre d'Olivet (French: [ɑ̃twan fabʁ dɔlivɛ]; Occitan: Antòni Fabre d'Olivet [anˈtɔni ˈfaβɾe ðuliˈβet]; 8 December 1767 in Ganges – 25 March 1825 in Paris) was a French author, poet and composer whose Biblical and philosophical hermeneutics influenced many occultists, such as Eliphas Lévi, Gérard Encausse ("Papus") and Édouard Schuré.

His best known works are on the research of the Hebrew language and the history of the human race entitled (1) The Hebraic Tongue Restored: And the True Meaning of the Hebrew Words Re-Established and Proved by their Radical Analysis, and (2) Hermeneutic Interpretation of the Origin of the Social State of Man and of the Destiny of the Adamic Race. Other works of renown are on the sacred art of music entitled Music Explained as Science and as Art and Considered in its Analog Relationship with Religious Mysteries, Ancient Mythology and the History of the Earth, and a translation and commentary of Pythagoras's thirty-six Golden Verses.

His interest in Pythagoras and the resulting works started a revival of Neo-Pythagoreanism that would later influence many occultists and new age spiritualists. He attempted an alternative interpretation of Genesis, based on what he considered to be connections between the Hebrew alphabet and hieroglyphs. The discovery of the Rosetta Stone and the subsequent decipherment of Egyptian hieroglyphs that followed would prove much of this particular work technically mistaken. He was declared a non-person by Napoleon I.

An interesting story involves his supposed healing of a deaf boy, Rodolphe Grivel, of his hearing impairment, and then having Napoleon officially declare that he is never again to heal another person of deafness. He indicates that he kept the letter of notice out of amusement. Outside of esotericism, he also invented the poetic measure of eumolpique. He had a discussion with Lord Byron over the British poet's publishing of a play, Cain, in which he said that since both of them were raised as reformed Protestants, he wrote: "We can understand one another perfectly; and if I didn't have anything to reprove you as a heretic, you would not have to fear my orthodoxy". D'Olivet thought that because Lord Byron did not use the original Hebraic version of the text of Sacred Scripture, but instead a misleading English translation in the play, is therefore leading others towards falsity and away from truth.

== Early life and education ==
Born Antoine Fabre on 8 December 1767, but later changing his name to Fabre d'Olivet by dropping the name 'Antoine' and adding his mother's name d'Olivet, he grew up in the Languedoc province in the south of France. When he reached the age of eleven or twelve he was sent to Paris by his father, a businessman in the international silk industry, who wished his son to receive a good education and assist the family business. He spent five years in the French capital, where he learned Latin, Greek and English. Having completed his studies, in 1786 he travelled as a salesman for his father's company, learning German in the process, but with little commercial success. During his travels he met a young woman, Chrisna; the effects of the encounter on him were long-lasting and later inspired the first of his songs to be published.

== Revolutionary period and aftermath ==
Antoine Fabre returned to Paris in 1789, ostensibly for purposes related to his father's firm. However, Paris was about to undergo revolutionary upheaval later in the year and he became actively involved in political pursuits; recalling the period later in his life, he wrote that he had written speeches designed to appeal to moderate Parisians. Although his political stance during this era would later cause him problems, he survived both the French Revolution, and the subsequent period of terror it unleashed, unscathed. Following this period of political upheaval, he turned his attention to his artistic interests. These included both music and literature, and during this time he wrote for the stage – both drama and the libretto for the Paris Opéra's 1794 work Toulon soumis – as well as poetry, fiction and journalism. It was at this time that he changed his name to Fabre d'Olivet.

D'Olivet's father fared less well after the Revolution; his silk business failed and consequently his son's own prospects of financial independence were ended. As a result, Fabre d'Olivet sought employment and in 1799 secured work in the French War Ministry. In his autobiography, Mes souvenirs (published posthumously), he later admitted that he worked on a number of personal literary projects instead of fulfilling his official duties. The year after joining the War Ministry, he fell in love with Julie Marcel but decided against marrying her. Her death in 1802, after they had parted, later influenced his philosophical thinking; he claimed that she had appeared to him on several occasions, and he credited her with his theories concerning both the soul's immortality and Providence.

== Works ==
- Le Quatorze de juillet 1789, fait historique en 1 acte et en vers, Paris, théâtre des Associés, juillet 1790.
- Toulon soumis, fait historique, opéra en un acte, Paris, théâtre national de l’Opéra, 4 mars 1794 Text online
- Le Sage de l’Indostan, drame philosophique en 1 acte et en vers, mêlé de chœurs de musique, Paris, Institut national des aveugles-travailleurs, thermidor an IV (1796)
- Azalaïs et le gentil Aimar, histoire provençale, traduite d’un ancien manuscrit provençal, Maradan, Paris, 1798,
- Lettres à Sophie sur l’histoire (2 vol., 1801). Réédition en un vol., précédée d'une introduction par Emmanuel Dufour-Kowalski. Collection Delphica, L’Âge d’homme, Lausanne, 2009.
- Le Troubadour, poésies occitaniques (1803). Réédition : Lacour, Nîmes, 1997.
- Notions sur le sens de l’ouïe en général, et en particulier sur la guérison de Rodolphe Grivel, sourd-muet de naissance en une série de lettres écrites par Fabre d’Olivet (1811). Text online. Réédition de l'édition de 1819, augmentée des éclaircissements nécessaires, des Notes et des pièces justificatives à l'appui. Avec une introduction inédite d'Eudoxie Fabre d'Olivet, précédés de considérations préliminaires par Emmanuel Dufour-Kowalski. Nouvelle Bibliothèque Initiatique, série 2, n°6. Slatkine, Genève, 2014.
- Les Vers dorés de Pythagore, expliqués et traduits pour la première fois en vers eumolpiques français, précédés d’un Discours sur l’essence et la forme de la poésie, chez les principaux peuples de la terre (1813). Réédition : L’Âge d’homme, Lausanne, 1991 et 2010. Text online
- La Langue hébraïque restituée et le véritable sens des mots hébreux rétabli et prouvé par leur analyse radicale, ouvrage dans lequel on trouve réunis : (1) une dissertation sur l’origine de la parole; (2) une grammaire hébraïque; (3) une série de racines hébraïques; (4) un discours préliminaire; (5) une traduction en français des dix premiers chapitres du Sépher, contenant la Cosmogonie de Moyse (1815). Réédition : L’Âge d’homme, Lausanne, 1985. Nouvelle édition augmentée d'une lettre de Fabre d'Olivet à Monsieur La Grange et de la transcription imprimée du manuscrit de la Théodoxie Universelle. Collection Delphica L'Age d'Homme, Lausanne, 2010. Text online 1 2
- De l’état social de l’homme, ou Vues philosophiques sur l’histoire du genre humain, précédées d’une dissertation introductive sur les motifs et l’objet de cet ouvrage (2 vol., 1822) Text online 1 2
- Caïn, mystère dramatique en trois actes de lord Byron, traduit en vers français et réfuté dans une suite de remarques philosophiques et critiques (1823). Réédition : Slatkine, Genève, 1981.
- Histoire philosophique du genre humain, ou L’homme considéré sous ses rapports religieux et politiques dans l’état social, à toutes les époques et chez les différents peuples de la terre, précédée d’une dissertation introductive sur les motifs et l’objet de cet ouvrage (2 vol., 1824). Réédition : Éditions traditionnelles, Paris, 1966.
- Le Retour aux beaux-arts, dithyrambe pour l’année 1824 (1824)

Posthumous publications

- La Musique expliquée comme science et comme art et considérée dans ses rapports analogiques avec les mystères religieux, la mythologie ancienne et l’histoire de la terre (1896). Réédition : L’Âge d’homme, Lausanne, 1974. Text online
- La Vraie Maçonnerie et la céleste culture, texte inédit avec introduction et notes critiques par Léon Cellier, Presses universitaires de France, Paris, 1952; La Proue, Lausanne, 1973. Réédition, coll. Delphica L'Age d'Homme, 2010.
- Mes souvenirs, Boumendil, Nice, 1977.
- Miscellanea Fabre d’Olivet (1). Oratorio à l’occasion de la fête du sacre et du couronnement de S.M. l’Empereur. Prédictions politiques. Idamore ou le Prince africain. Vers à mes amis pour le jour de ma fête, publié par Gilbert Tappa, Boumendil, Nice, 1978.
- Miscellanea Fabre d’Olivet (2). Antoine Fabre d’Olivet et les concours de l’Institut : Discours sur les avantages et les inconvénients de la critique littéraire. Dissertation sur le rythme et la prosodie des anciens et des modernes, publié par Gilbert Tappa, Boumendil, Nice, 1982.
- La Langue d’Oc rétablie dans ses principes, Steinfeld, Ganges, 1989.

== Bibliography ==
- Emmanuel Dufour-Kowalski: Fabre d'Olivet, Le Théosophe Immortel. L'Âge d'Homme, Paris, 2014, (ISBN 978-2-8251-4482-4)
- Christian Anatole, Robert Lafont, Nouvelle histoire de la littérature occitane, Paris, P.U.F., 1970.
- Léon Cellier et Jean-Claude Richard (éd.), Fabre d’Olivet (1767-1825) : Contribution à l’étude des aspects religieux du romantisme, Nizet, Paris, 1953. Réédition : Slatkine, Genève, 1998 (ISBN 2051016399)
- Jean Pinasseau, Lettres et documents inédits pour servir une biographie de A. Fabre d’Olivet, Issy-les-Moulineaux, 1931. Extrait du Bulletin de l’histoire du protestantisme, no. 3, juillet-septembre 1931.
- Sédir, Éléments d’hébreu, d’après la méthode de Fabre d’Olivet, Ollendorff, Paris, 1901.
- Valérie Van Crugten-André, Les Aveugles dans la littérature française du XVIIIe siècle. Autour du Sage de l’Indostan de Fabre d’Olivet in Voir, Ligue Braille (Belgique), no. 18, May 1999, pp. 46–53.
- Philippe Gardy, L’Exil des origines. Renaissance littéraire et renaissance linguistique en pays de langue d’oc aux XIXe et XXe siècles, 2006 (ISBN 2867813956)
- Philippe Gardy, L’Œuvre poétique occitane d’Antoine Fabre d’Olivet : sujet littéraire et sujet linguistique in L’Occitanie Romantique, Actes du colloque de Pau, 1994, Annales de Littérature Occitane 3, CELO, Pau, 1997, pp. 147–165.
- Fabre d’Olivet (1767-1825), poète occitaniste, hébraïsant et théosophe, Revue La France latine, Revue d’études d’oc, no. 138, 2004.
- Georg Kremnitz, Fabre d’Olivet reconsidéré, Revue Lengas, 18, 1985, pp. 408–421.
- André Tanner (éd.), Gnostiques de la révolution. Tome II : Fabre d’Olivet, Egloff, Paris, 1946.
- Joscelyn Godwin, Fabre d'Olivet The Super-Enlightenment Project | Stanford University Libraries

== See also ==
- Occitan literature
