= Tarquimpol =

- Commune
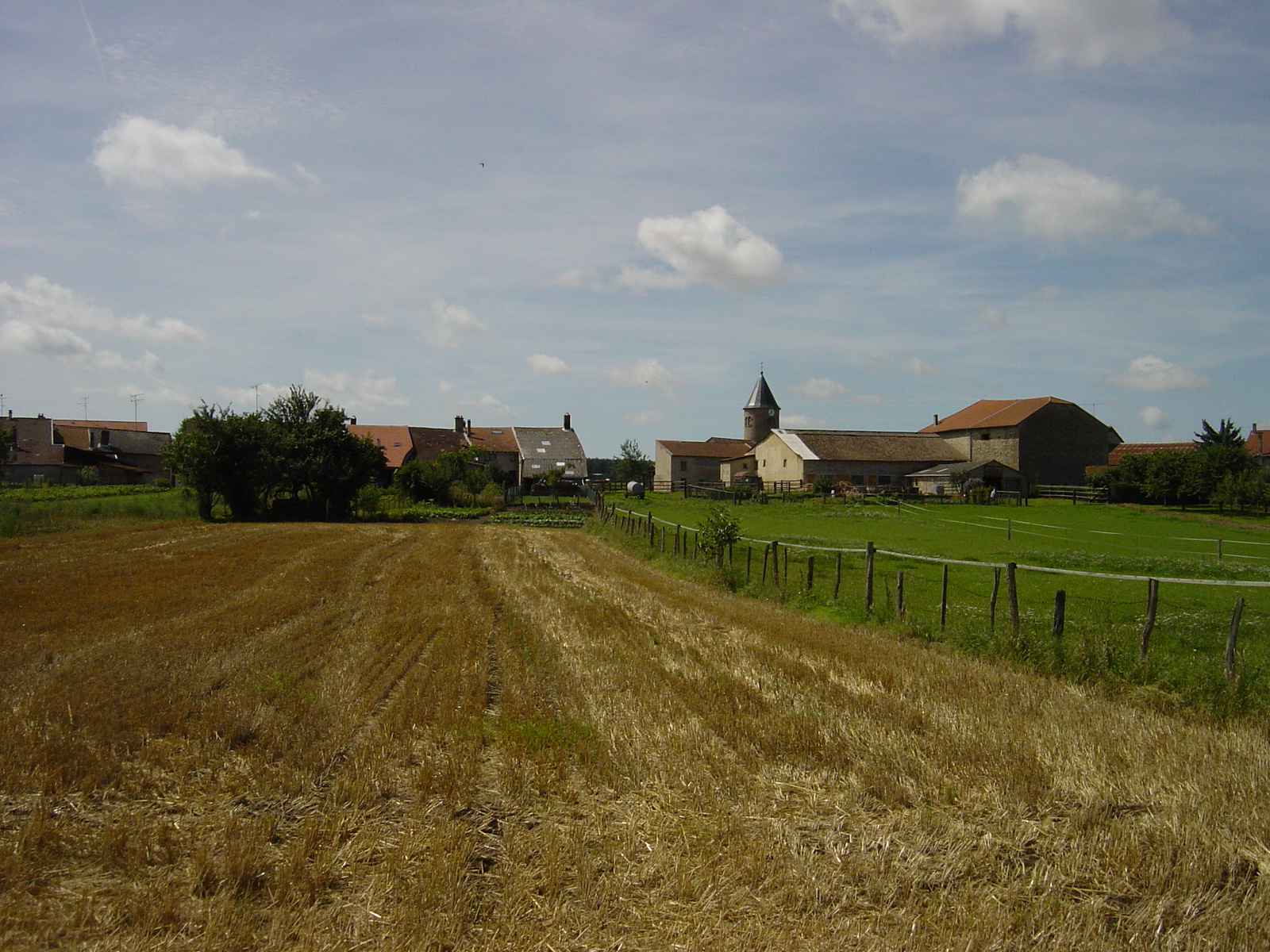
- The landscape of Tarquimpol

- Coat of arms
- Location of Tarquimpol
- Location within France Location within Grand Est
- Coordinates: 48°47′07″N 6°45′32″E
- Country: France
- Region: Grand Est
- Department: Moselle
- Arrondissement: Sarrebourg-Château-Salins
- Canton: Le Saulnois
- Intercommunality: CC du Saulnois

Government
  - Mayor (2020–2026): David Barthelemy
- Area^{1}: 4.09 km^{2} (1.58 sq mi)
- Elevation: 220 m (720 ft)
- Highest elevation: 243 m (797 ft)
- Lowest elevation: 210 m (690 ft)
- Population (2023): 60
  - Density: 15/km^{2} (38/sq mi)
- Time zone: UTC+01:00 (CET)
  - Summer (DST): UTC+02:00 (CEST)
- INSEE/Postal code: 57664 /57260
- ^{1} French Land Register data, which excludes lakes, ponds, glaciers > 1 km^{2} (0.386 sq mi or 247 acres) and river estuaries.

Tarquimpol (French pronunciation: [taʁkɛ̃pɔl]; German: Taichenpuhl) is a commune in the Moselle department in Grand Est in north-eastern France.

== See also ==
- Communes of the Moselle department
- Parc naturel régional de Lorraine
