= Saint-Yves (surname) =

Saint-Yves (sometimes Saintyve, Saintyves) is a French surname, borne by a family of intellectuals living in Paris between the 17th and 20th centuries, notably. Others ancient spellings: Sanct, Sancte, Sante, Saint, Sant, Sants, Sancti, Sanctius, Santis, Santi.

- Saint-Yves (the elder) or Pierre de Saint-Yves (1660–1730), painter, member of the Royal Academy (Académie royale de Peinture et de Sculpture)
- Saint-Yves (1808–1871), pen name of the French playwright Édouard Déaddé
- Charles Saint-Yves (1667–1731), ophthalmologist and brother of the painter
- Charles (Léoffroy) de Saint-Yves (1717–1804), art critic and collector
- Alexandre Saint-Yves d'Alveydre (1842–1909), writer and son of Guillaume-Alexandre Saint-Yves
- Pierre Saintyves, pen name of Émile Nourry (1870–1935), French folklorist
