= Nizier Anthelme Philippe =

French occultist

Nizier Anthelme Philippe (25 April 1849 – 2 August 1905) was a reputed healer and miracle worker.

Although he had no formal medical training, many academic and social honors were conferred on him during the 1880s and 1890s in Russia, France, Italy, and the United States.

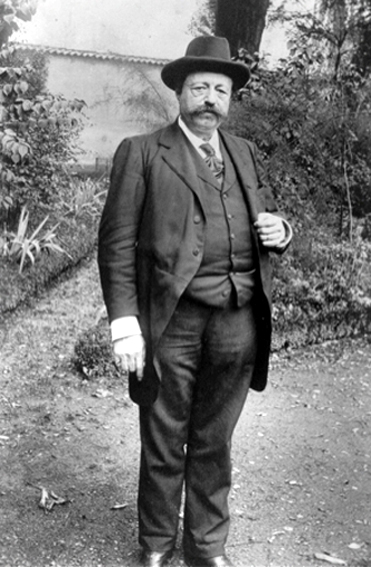
Nizier Anthelme Philippe (Maître Philippe de Lyon) 1849–1905

== Biography ==
Philippe was born in 1849 at Le Rubathier, Loisieux, Savoy, France, the son of peasants. His mother was Marie Vachod (1823–1899) and his father was Joseph Philippe (1819–1898). From the age of fourteen he stayed with his uncle Vachod, a butcher in Lyon. He gained a reputation as a healer by the age of thirteen.

As a young man, he enrolled in the institution Sainte-Barbe, held by Abbot Chevalier, where he obtained a grammar certificate. In 1870, during the war between France and Prussia, Philippe relieved the sick he received in the Perrache district of Lyon. During the same period, he is said to have saved the young Jean Chapas, 7 years old and victim of meningitis, who would then become his disciple in 1883.

He married Jeanne Julie Landar (1859–1939) on 6 October 1877 in L'Arbresle. He had a daughter, Jeanne Marie Victoire born on 11 November 1878. She died on 29 August 1904 aged 25, just before her seventh wedding anniversary. He refused to heal her, saying that it was Heaven's wish that she should go on ahead, and predicted the course of her illness and death. "This death," he said, "has for me been a living crucifixion."

== Career ==
He gained a reputation as a miracle worker. He was four times on trial for illegal practice of medicine between 1887 and 1892 and was acquitted. He went to St Petersburg where he was awarded his Doctor's Diploma in recognition of extraordinary feats of remote healing conducted in St Petersburg.

Grand Duchess Militza Nikolaevna of Russia later introduced Dr. Philippe to Empress Alexandra Feodorovna of Russia in 1901, and Dr. Philippe became a close adviser to the imperial couple.

In October 1884 he presented a paper (published in French) entitled "Principles of Hygiene applicable in Pregnancy, Childbirth and Infancy" at the University of Cincinnati, Ohio. In recognition of this the university conferred a Doctorate of Medicine on him. Many other academic and social honors were conferred on him during the 1880s and 1890s in France and Italy.

Philippe died on 2 August 1905 at the age of 56, in L'Arbresle, Rhône, France, where he was living. He is buried in the cemetery of Loyasse, in Lyon, France. Jean Chapas (1863–1932), the beloved disciple of Master Philippe, is also buried in the cemetery of Loyasse.

At Philippe's death, his family discovered that he was paying the rents for 52 families in need. His disciple Jean Chapas continued to pay all the rents until his death in 1932.

== Decorations and titles ==
- Officer Iftikhar Nicham by the Bey of Tunis, February 22, 1881.
- Captain of firefighters of L'Arbresle in 1884 by order of the French Minister of the Interior.
- Medical Doctorate by the University of Cincinnati conferred October 23, 1884.
- Honorary Citizen for his scientific and humanitarian merits of the city of Acri, 28 April 1885.
- Honorary Officer of the French Red Cross, registered on the golden guestbook (No. 13b) on 15 January 1886.
- Protector member of the Academy of Mont-Réal in Toulouse, appointed April 20, 1886.
- Honorary Doctor of Medicine at the Royal Academy of Rome, May 12, 1886.
- Director of School of Magnetism and Massage of Lyon, approved by the Academy of Medicine and the French State, March 26, 1895.
- Medical Doctorate of the Imperial Military Medical Academy in St. Petersburg, with the rank of General in 1901.

== Books ==
- Alfred Haehl, Vie et Paroles du Maître Philippe (Life and Words of the Master Philippe), DERVY edition, 1995.
- Claude Laurent, Guérisons et enseignement de Maître Philippe, Le Mercure Dauphinois, Collection Autour de Maître Philippe de Lyon, 2003.
- Sédir, La vie inconnue de Jésus-Christ, Le Mercure Dauphinois, Collection Autour de Maître Philippe de Lyon, 2003.
- Auguste Jacquot, Auguste Philippe, Les réponses de Maître Philippe - Suivies des enseignements recueillis par son frère Auguste, Le Mercure Dauphinois, Collection Autour de Maître Philippe de Lyon, 2004.
- Michel de Saint Martin, Révélations : Entretiens spirituels sur le maître Philippe de Lyon, Dangles, 1955, 214 p.
- Phaneg, L'Esprit qui peut tout, Le Mercure Dauphinois, Collection Autour de Maître Philippe de Lyon, 2004.
- Jean Baptiste Ravier, Confirmation de l'Evangile par les actes et paroles de Maître Philippe de Lyon, Le Mercure Dauphinois, Collection Autour de Maître Philippe de Lyon, 2005.
- Philippe Collin, Monsieur Philippe de Lyon - Album souvenirs, Le Mercure Dauphinois, Collection Autour de Maître Philippe de Lyon, 2005.
- Philippe Collin, Vie et enseignements de Jean Chapas Le disciple de Maître Philippe de Lyon, Le Mercure Dauphinois, Collection Autour de Maître Philippe de Lyon, 2006.
- Victoire Philippe, Les carnets de Victoire Philippe, Le Mercure Dauphinois, Collection Autour de Maître Philippe de Lyon, 2006.
- Vandekerkhove, Christian: Het Paranormale is onder ons: De Wonderen van Meester Philippe, Mens & Cultuur Uitgevers nv,

== Documentaries ==
- Maître Philippe de Lyon, le chien du Berger (2005) (DVD); Director: Bernard Bonnamour; Production Company: Le Mercure Dauphinois.
- L’Énigme Philippe (2008) (TV); Director: Christel Chabert; Production Company: CLC Productions (Compagnie Lyonnaise de Cinéma), France 3, France 3 Auvergne Rhône-Alpes; Broadcast on August 13, 2008, on national television France 3.
