= Henri Antoine Jules-Bois =

French writer

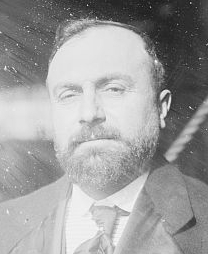
- Henri Antoine Jules-Bois
- Born: September 29, 1868; Marseille, France
- Died: July 2, 1943 (aged 74); New York, United States
- Occupations: Journalist, poet, playwright
- Writing career
- Language: French

Signature
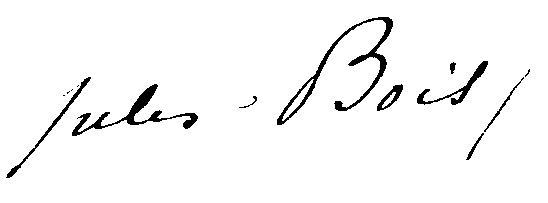

Henri Antoine Jules-Bois (or simply Jules Bois; 29 September 1868, Marseille – 2 July 1943, New York), was a French writer with an interest in the occult.

He wrote Le Satanisme et la magie (Satanism and Magic). He was a noted friend of McGregor Mathers, the founder of the Hermetic Order of the Golden Dawn.

In a 1909 essay for The New York Times, Bois successfully predicted the rise of suburbia, the onset of gender equality and technical innovations such as a flying bicycle (though he overestimated its success).

== Works ==
- Il ne faut pas mourir, dialogue (1891)
- Les Petites Religions de Paris (1894)
- L'Éternelle Poupée (1894)
- Le Satanisme et la magie (1895)
- Prière, poème (1885-1893) (1895)
- La Douleur d'aimer (1896)
- L'Ève nouvelle (1896)
- La Femme inquiète (1897)
- Dans le monde des esprits (1897)
- Une nouvelle douleur, novel (1900)
- Le Mystère et la volupté (1901)
- L'Au-delà et les forces inconnues: opinion de l'élite sur le mystère (1902)
- Le Monde invisible. Lettre de M. Sully Prudhomme. Les occultistes, les théosophes, le luciférisme, le satanisme, les deux envoûtements, les marchands d'espoir, l'église spirite, les recherches psychiques, conclusions (1902)
- Visions de l'Inde (1903)
- Le Miracle moderne. La Métapsychique: la surâme et le surhomme, la télépathie et les fantômes des vivants, rayons humains, maisons hantées, aventures d'un revenant, un chapelet de voyantes, le mystère des tables tournantes éclairci, le mécanisme du miracle de Lourdes, les professeurs de volonté, le miracle est en nous, création d'une humanité supérieure (1907)
- Le Nouveau Faublas (1908)
- Le Vaisseau des caresses, novel (1908)
- L'Humanité divine, poems (1910)
- Le Couple futur (1912)
- L'Amour doux et cruel. À propos de l'homme qui a volé la Joconde. L'Auto rouge (1913)
- L'Éternel Retour, novel (1914)

=== Theatre ===
- Les Noces de Sathan, esoteric drama (1892)
- La Porte héroïque du ciel (1894)
- Hippolyte couronné (1904)
- La Furie, drama in 5 acts, Paris, Comédie-Française (1909)
- Les Deux Hélène, dramatic poem in one act (1911)
- Naïl, dramatic poem in three acts (1912)
