= Ordre Reaux Croix =

International Martinist order

Ordre Reaux Croix is a Martinist order established in 2002, on the 250th anniversary of the founding of the Elus Cohens of Martinez de Pasqually. ORC is an international Order, with its Grand Lodge in Norway, and jurisdictions in Sweden, United States, Canada, Argentina, Spain, Greece, Brazil and England.

== Organisation ==
Ordre Reaux Croix distinguishes itself from other contemporary Martinist orders, in two ways: firstly, in that it is specifically dedicated to research, implementation and publication of Martinist literature, also of historical relevance in academic circles; secondly in that it operates all three previous forms of Martinism under one banner, an approach to the tradition previously unknown by esoteric scholars.

== ORC's historical research ==
Attention is paid to translating and making public the hitherto forgotten works of the Russian Martinists, such as the printer and statesman Ivan Vladimirovich Lopukhin and the philanthropist Nikolay Novikov, who introduced the age of Enlightenment to Russia. Apart from being prolific writers and reformers of the late Tsarist regime, their contributions to literary, scholarly and social developments, with the establishment of printing presses, public schools and hospitals for the poor. These authors' works are not readily available in English, but have been placed in the public domain on the order's webpage.

== Codependency of the Martinist traditions within the ORC ==
Since the conception of what is commonly referred to as Martinism, all the original ways that the tradition has been operated have been gathered and reworked into a single initiatic body where every branch is codependent on the others.

== Voie Cardiaque ==
Voie Cardiaque

=== The mysticism of Saint-Martins, as organized by Papus ===
Voie Cardiaque – 'The Way of the Heart' – is the mystical and contemplative branch of the ORC, from whose roots the two other branches of the order spring. This is the inner path, working toward the universal reintegration of mankind.

The teachings of the V.C. are Christian in nature and based directly upon the works of Louis Claude de Saint-Martin, who wrote under the name the Unknown Philosopher. Saint-Martin was born in a noble family in Amboise, France, on 18 January 1743. He became one of Martinez de Pasqually's students in the Elus Cohen and also his close friend and secretary. St Martin was a Freemason and an Elus Cohen for many years. He decided to leave both these Orders and the praxis of theurgy in order to work in a purely mystical way. He began to instruct students in his own teachings, which were mainly influenced by Pasqually's doctrine, but later on also inspired by the writings of the Christian mystic Jakob Böhme. Saint-Martin died on 13 October 1803, leaving behind a great number of students spread across Europe, passing on the teachings through the centuries.

The Summit of these teachings is the initiation Saint-Martin describes in this way:

"The only initiation which I advocate and which I look for with all the ardor of my Soul, is that by which we are able to enter into the Heart of God within us, and there make an Indissoluble Marriage, which makes us the Friend, the Brother and Spouse of the Repairer … there is no other way to arrive at this Holy Initiation than for us to delve more and more into the depth of our Soul and to not let go of the prize until we have succeeded in liberating its lively and vivifying origin."

The pathway to this state of mind is given to the aspirant through a series of degrees in the manner adopted by Papus at the end of the 19th century. The ORC scale of the rituals, has however been reformed, to first purge them of most of the Masonic style, and has incorporated more Christian elements, and older teachings, more specifically from the original doctrine of St Martin, and the Russian legacy he left behind him. The inner circle of ORC is continuously writing new material based upon their studies and experience of attainment. It is loyal to the teachings and symbolic language of its founding fathers and the past masters, and does not incorporate other branches of esotericism not related to Martinism.

== Elus Cohens ==
=== Pasqually's system, the oldest magical order in history ===
Elus Cohen is the theurgical branch of the order, working with magical ceremonies and doctrines deriving from the founder of the tradition, Martinez de Pasqually.

The aim of the order is to mend the wounds that mankind brought upon himself after falling from grace. Mankind will retake his former and right position in the celestial hierarchies by the aid of Christ the repairer and redeemer, and the work of theurgical operations. The work is further to reintegrate everything into its former virtues and powers, to the greater glory of the Lord God.

The initiate learns many techniques and methods in this work: among the most important is prayer, invocations of God and his agents and angels, and exorcisms and banishing of the Adversary and his agents.

Martinez de Pasqually was the son of Messier de la Tour de la Case, a French master mason with an inheritable patent, giving him the right to open new lodges. This patent was given to Martinez de Pasqually by his father and was made by the Grandmaster of the Stuart lodge, namely Prince Charles Edward Stuart.

Martinez de Pasqually began to gather members for his new system in 1754, by the founding of the Chapter Les Juges Ecoissase in Montpellier. In 1765 he received blessings from the French grand lodge for his work after having informed them that he had opened 5 lodges on his Stuart patent. This recognition made the system legal, and was thus one of the early high degree systems in freemasonry. The Sovereign sanctuary was formed in 1767, and the years to come until Pasqually's death in 1774 were the golden years of the rite, with lodges in almost all of the larger cities in France. After the death of its founder, the rite slowly disappeared from the initiatory scene but activity continued in smaller groups. The seed or lineage of the order lives on but does so in other systems, unbroken to this day.

The Elus Cohen of the ORC was opened at the equinox 250 years after Pasqually started his work by founding the order. ORC has kept all the essential parts of the system of the 18th century intact, but has when needed taken necessary measures for its survival in the 21st century with regards to the lives of its initiates of today. The Elus Cohen is worked in a total of seven degrees. New degrees are only given when the initiate has fulfilled their work and proven their skill.

== Chevalier Bienfaisant de la Cité Sainte ==
=== Jean-Baptiste Willermoz' chivalry system ===
The CBCS is the chivalric branch of the Martinist tradition, where knighthood meets the Martinist doctrine. The aim of the CBCS is to enable the Chevalieres to follow the Imitation of Christ, and adopt a life of moral chivalry as the basis of all spiritual attainment. Furthering the personal work of rebuilding what once was lost, the work of the Knights and the Dames of the order is to manifest the charitable teachings of Martinism in the world through beneficent and unselfish deeds. CBCS is thus the chivalric branch of the Martinist tradition, the poor knights of Christ.

The original creator of the CBCS was Jean Baptiste Willermoz (1730–1824), close friend and student of Martinez de Pasqually. When Pasqually died in 1774, the teachings of his master were at risk of being lost, and Willermoz then decided to use a Masonic body as a vehicle for the inner and secret teachings of the Order of Elus Cohens. Willermoz was a pragmatic esoteric scholar and innovator. His work as a Freemason is of fundamental impact and erudition, but has been forgotten over the centuries. He is often viewed as an ardent knight of truth fighting to rectify the decadence of secret societies and the lack of sincere desire for enlightenment within them. He is credited not only for securing the survival of Martinism with the CBCS but was also the original author behind the Rose Croix degree of freemasonry, as it is now known in Scottish rites. He was an avid archivist in several rites, and held an extensive collection of the original Elus Cohen material, which he treasured above any other: at the age of ninety-two he advised his last student, the Baron of Turkheim, to make Pasqually's treatise his primary and daily study. These teachings were his to expound upon, as he held the highest degree in the old order of Pasqually, and thus he, in his well-known luminous and inspired style, reformed them into a suitable form of chivalric tradition whose aim was the practical application of Martinism in human society.

CBCS was originally intimately connected to the German Masonic rite of the templar order, the Stricte Observance of Baron von Hund, where Willermoz was given the right to reform the degrees to encompass the teachings of his own master. As the ORC is a Martinist order, it practices a reformed branch of the CBCS based upon the direct teachings and lineages of its predecessors.

The reformed ORC: CBCS is thus absolutely independent of Masonic tradition, or any obedience that uses these knightly degrees or affiliations. The order has a total of seven degrees of work and one administrative degree. These are divided into three independent classes. The order is open to both men and women of good standing, of at least the age of 24, with different initiation rituals for Knights and Dames.

The secret Martinist teachings formerly kept in the class of "Profession", the seventh and first degree of the old Secret Class, are in the ORC developed into every faculty and degree of the CBCS branch. This ensures that Martinist doctrine is prevalent over, and replaces all other symbolic languages, enabling the rite to stand out as a pure Martinist chivalric way of reintegration, presented with the words and directions of Willermoz' legacy.

== Teachings ==
The teachings of the order are based on three pillars: Christian mysticism, kabbalah, and Martinism as established by Louis-Claude de Saint-Martin, Martinez de Pasqually and Jean-Baptiste Willermoz. As opposed to many contemporary Martinist orders, the teachings of the ORC, both current and forthcoming, based directly on the teachings of the former. It is thus transmitted within the framework of Christianity. Nevertheless, the order invites 'all men and women of desire of goodwill, and a belief in a divinity', independent of religious denomination.

These teachings are transmitted from one person to another in an oratory or a temple, and all matters of the order's work are based on a close relationship between teacher and student. The tradition stems from and incorporates authentic lineages and material from the Elus Cohens, CBCS, Ordre Martiniste, and the Russian Martinists and Theorists.
