= Alexander Vustin =

Russian composer (1943–2020)

- Алекса́ндр Кузьми́ч Ву́стин
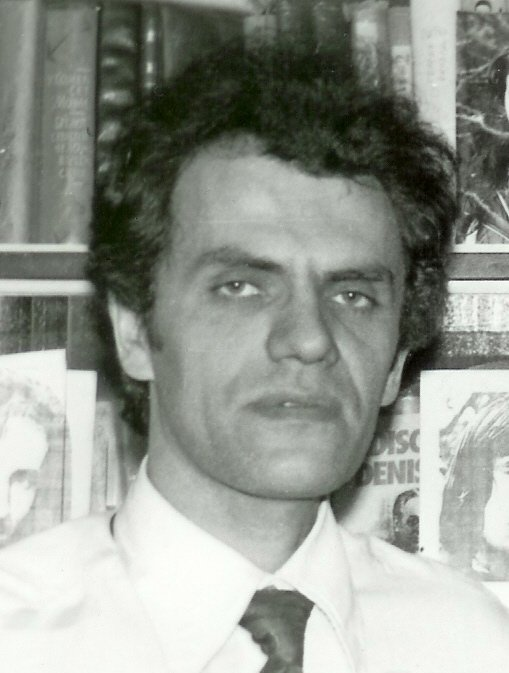
- Alexander Vustin in 1983
- Born: Alexander Kuzmich Vustin; 24 April 1943; Soviet Union
- Died: 19 April 2020 (aged 76); Moscow
- Other name: Alexander Wustin
- Education: Moscow Conservatory
- Occupation: Composer

Alexander Kuzmich Vustin, also Voustin or Wustin (Russian: Алекса́ндр Кузьми́ч Ву́стин; 24 April 1943 – 19 April 2020) was a Russian composer. His works, including the opera The Devil in Love, were played and recorded internationally.

== Biography ==
Vustin studied composition first with Grigory Frid at a regional music college, and later with Vladimir Ferè at the Moscow Conservatory, graduating in 1969. Between 1969 and 1974, Vustin worked as a music editor at USSR Radio. From 1974 he worked as an editor at the Kompozitor publishing house.

== Music ==
Vustin composed from 1963, but regarded only works written since 1972 as valid. His musical language is distinctive by the remarkable organization of its musical texture. Vustin uses the twelve-tone technique, but in his own original way.

His first notable compositions were written in the midst of the 70s: the eight-minute-long The Word (scored for ensemble of woodwinds, brass and percussion (1975)) was dedicated to Grigori Frid; and the three-minute long In Memory of Boris Klyuzner, for baritone and string quartet (1977) was set to the autobiographical text by Yuri Olesha. Another piece, Blessed are the Poor in Spirit for boy-soprano (or counter-tenor) accompanied by a chamber ensemble was composed in 1988 to the text from Matthew 5:3–8.

His opera The Devil in Love, to the Russian libretto by Vladimir Khachaturov after the novel The Devil in Love by Jacques Cazotte, the result of 15 years of labour (1975–1989), is probably one of the most important of his works. Its musical material nourished the dozens of compositions written in around the same period. The world premiere of the opera took place at the Stanislavski and Nemirovich-Danchenko Theatre on 15 February 2019, conducted by Vladimir Jurowski.

The works of Alexander Vustin are frequently featured in the programs of major festivals, including Kremerata Musica, Tage für Neue Musik (Zürich), Holland Festival, the 14th Musik Biennale Berlin, Présence 93 (Paris), Melos-Ethos (Bratislava), Maraton Soudobe Hudby (Prague), Donaueschinger Musiktage, Deutsche Kammerphilharmonie (Germany), Lockenhaus Chamber Music Festival (Austria), Moscow Forum, and Moscow Autumn (Russia). Among performers of his music are the conductors Vladimir Jurowski, Reinbert de Leeuw, Lev Markiz, Eri Klas, Igor Dronov, Alexander Lazarev, Vitaly Kataev, Gidon Kremer, Martyn Brabbins, and Cristoph Hagel. Ensembles include Kremerata Baltica, Amsterdam Wind Orchestra, Schönberg Ensemble, Radio Philharmonic Orchestra and Nieuw Sinfonietta Amsterdam (Netherlands), the Mark Pekasky Percussion Ensemble, Studio New Music, Ensemble of Soloists of the Bolshoi Theatre, the Moscow Contemporary Music Ensemble, and the BBC Symphony Orchestra.

He died in Moscow on 19 April 2020, from pneumonia, or COVID-19, as other sources report.

== Works ==
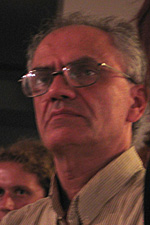
Alexander Vustin (2008)

Vustin's works were published by Hans Sikorski.

- Three Poems of Moses Teif for bass and piano, in Russian, translated by Yunna Moritz, (1965)
- String Quartet (1966)
- Symphony (1969)
- Three Toropets songs for piano (1972)
- Nocturnes for chamber ensemble and high voice in three movements (1972–1982)
- Sonata for six for piccolo, flute, clarinet, viola, cello, and 5 string double bass (1973
- Lamento for piano (1974)
- Toropets Songs for ensemble (1975
- The Word for winds and percussions, dedicated. text by Fried (1975)
- Capriccio (tunes from the collection of M. Beregovsky) fr voice (mezzo-soprano), male voices and ensemble (1977–1982)
- In memory of Boris Klyuzner (1977) for voice, violin, viola, cello and double bass, to the text by Yuri Olesha
- Memoria-2, oncerto for percussion, keyboards and strings (1978)
- Fairy Tale (Skazka) for oboe solo (1979)
- Homecoming for voice and 13 instruments (2 string quartets, 2 pianos, horn, 2 percussion players), verses by Dmitri Shchedrovirsky (1981)
- The Leisure Time of Kozma Prutkov (Dosugi Kozmy Prutkova) for baritone and percussion (1982)
- Hommage à Beethoven (Posvyashchenie Beethovenu) concerto for percussion and chamber orchestra) (1984)
- Festivity (Prazdnik for children's choir and orchestra, texts from Russian song books of the 17th century (1985)
- Blessed are the poor in spirit for countertenor and chamber ensemble (1988)
- Devil in Love (Le Diable amoureux or Vlyublyonny dyavol), opera by Jacques Cazotte, libretto by Vladimir Khachaturov (1985–1999)
- Action from Luigi for a drum ensemble (1990)
- White music for organ (1990)
- Zaitsev's Letter for voice, strings, snare drum and magn. tapes. Text by Sergey Zaitsev. (1990)
- Music for the film for percussion and orchestra (1991)
- Music for Ten on the text by Jean-François de La Harpe (1991)
- Heroic lullaby for the ensemble (1991)
- Dedication to the Son (Posvyashchenie synu) for flute and ensemble (1992)
- Three Songs Andrei Platonov" from the novel "Chevengur" for voice and ensemble (clarinet, bass clarinet, viola, cello, double bass, soprano) (1992)
- Agnus Dei for mixed choir, percussion and organ (1993)
- Little Requiem (Kleines Requiem) for soprano and string quartet (1994)
- Music for an Angel (1995) for saxophone, vibraphone and cello
- Song from the novel "Chevengur" for chorus and orchestra after Andrei Platonov" (1995)
- Disappearance for bayan, cello and string orchestra (1995)
- Fantasia for violin and orchestra, dedication to Gidon Kremer (1996)
- Tango "Hommage à Guidon" for violin, string orchestra and percussion (1997)
- Piano Trio (1998)
- Mark Pekarsky's Birthday for a percussion ensemble (1998)
- The Light of the Silent (1999)
- Praise the Earth for children's voices and chamber orchestra with lyrics by Olga Sedakova (1999)
- Veni, Sancte Spiritus for choir, percussion and ensemble (1999)
- Canto for a singing string trio, verses by Alexander Pushkin (1999)
- Alone for the vibraphone solo (2000)
- Sine Nomine for orchestra (2000)
- Night mist for chorus and chamber orchestra, poem by Boris Pasternak (2001)
- To Sofia for a voice (mezzo-soprano) and an ensemble for a poem by Olga Sedakova "The Hermit Speaks," dedicated to Sofia Gubaidulina (2001)
- Epigraph for organ (in memory Edison Denisov) (2001)
- Voice for alto (mezzo-soprano) solo, poems by Olga Sedakova (2001)
- The Seventh Word for the ensemble (part of a collective composition) (2002)
- Spem in alium for piano, voices (altos, basses) and ensemble for text from the motet by Thomas Tallis (2003)
- Postlude for the ensemble (2003)
- Eve's Exposure (Look No. 5) for orchestra (part of a collective composition) (2004)
- The Offering for the ensemble, dedicated to Gidon Kremer in memory of Dmitry Shostakovich (2004)
- Credo, for the ensemble dedicated. M. Dubov and A. Vinogradov in memory of Edison Denisov (2004)
- Evening Birds for string trio (2006)
- Theater for voice (mezzo-soprano) and ensemble lyrics by Dmitry Schedrovitsky (2006)
- Far Light for bassclarinet solo (2007)
- Musical sacrifice for cello and piano (2007)
- The Search for Sound for solo bells and orchestra (2008)
- Canticum canticorum (Song of Songs) for voices and ensemble (2010)
- Litany, for percussion, voices and organ (2011)
- From the Life of the Elves for piano, violin and cello (2011)
- Wind for the choir and instrumental ensemble for poetry by Alexander Blok from the poem "Twelve" (2012)
- The Evening Sea for a singing string trio, poems by Olga Sedakova (2012)
- Dedication for cello, percussion and piano (2013)
- In memory of Grigory Frid for viola and piano (2014)
- The Song of Lukerya for magnetic tape, folk voice and orchestra (2015)
- The Song of the ascent for orchestra and voices (2016)
- Three poems of Olga Sedakova for bass and orchestra (2017)

== CDs ==
- Kremerland

Release Date: 12 October 2004, Total Running time: 1:18:45
Label: DEUTSCHE GRAMMOPHON, Catalog No.: 000339202, UPC: 28947480129
The tracks include:
Alexander Vustin: Tango hommage à Gidon, for violin, string orchestra & percussion 7:37 Conducted by Gidon Kremer, Performed by Kremerata Baltica and Andrei Pushkarev

- Russian Saxophone

Label: BIS, CD-765 Digital
Audio CD (17 September 1996)
Alexander Vustin: Musique pour l'ange (1995), for tenor saxophone, vibraphone & cello
Performers: Claude DeLangle, Jean Geoffroy

- An Introduction to Alexander Wustin

Label: Megadisc, MDC 7845

1. The Word (1975) 7.36
2. Blessed are the Poor in Spirit (1988) 7.19
3. Music for Ten (1991) 4.56
4. To my Son (1992) 18.13
5. Heroic Lullaby (1991) 19.21

Performers: Studio for New Music conducted by Igor Dronov

- Alexander Wustin – Memoria 2, Agnus Dei, Sine Nomine

Label: Thorofon, CTH 2486

1. Memoria2 (1978) Concerto for percussion, keyboard instruments and strings Concert pour percussions 15.06
2. Song from the novel "Tchevengur" by Andrei Platonov (1995) for male choir and orchestra 7.37
3. Hommage a Beethoven (1984) Concerto for percussion instruments and small orchestra 16.05
4. Agnus Dei (1993) for mixed choir, percussion and organ 10.08
5. Sine Nomine (2000) for orchestra 16.29

== Bibliography ==
- «Ex oriente...III» Eight Composers from the former USSR: Philip Gershkovich, Boris Tishchenko, Leonid Grabovsky, Alexander Knaifel, Vladislav Shoot, Alexander Vustin, Alexander Raskatov, Sergei Pavlenko Edited by Valeria Tsenova. English edition (studia slavica musicologica, Bd. 31), 206 pp., music illus., ISBN 3-928864-92-0
