= Illuminism =

18th and 19th century Western esoteric religion

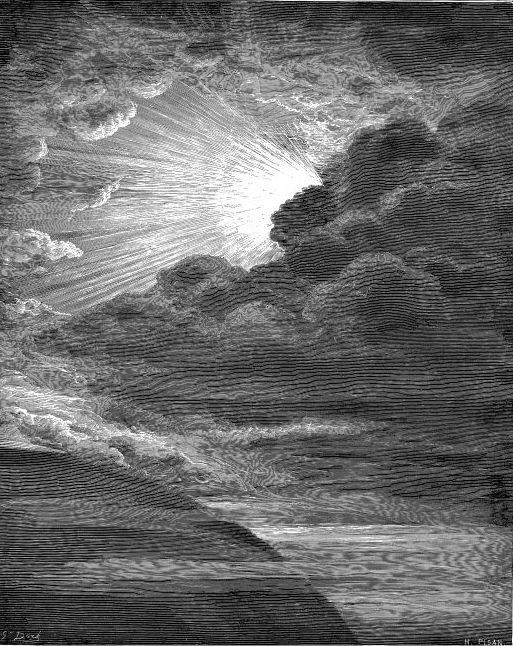
The Creation of Light (Gen. 1:1-5)

Illuminism was a European religious and philosophical movement of the late 18th and early 19th centuries. It was influenced by Gnosticism, Neoplatonism, Swedenborgianism and Eastern religions and was often syncretic in its approach to them. It belongs to the tradition of Western esotericism and was a forerunner of Romanticism. It is sometimes contrasted with the Enlightenment, being seen as the "spiritual" reaction or corrective to the Enlightenment's dependence on reason. The Illuminists, however, were not irrationalists. They were especially fond of analogical reasoning.

Illuminists generally regarded creation as an emanation from God. Man has a special role in the redemption of the fallen cosmos because he is free and the divine Word is in him. Metempsychosis and reincarnation played a role in many illuminist theories of "reintegration". Many Illuminists were sympathetic to Christianity but preferred a path outside of established churches. The Illuminists should not be confused with their contemporaries, the Illuminati of Bavaria, who had an expressly political purpose. By contrast, the Illuminists interpreted contemporary events providentially and included both revolutionaries and reactionaries.

== Writers ==
- Nicolas de Bonneville
- Pierre-Samuel Dupont de Nemours
- Karl von Eckartshausen
- Antoine Fabre d'Olivet
- Karl von Hund
- Johann Heinrich Jung-Stilling
- Niklaus Anton Kirchberger
- Johann Caspar Lavater
- Joseph de Maistre
- Jean Frederic Oberlin
- Bathilde d'Orléans
- Martinès de Pasqually
- Nicolas Rétif de la Bretonne
- Louis-Claude de Saint-Martin
- Jean-Baptiste Willermoz
