= M.R. Osborne =

English writer on Christian mysticism and Western esotericism

M. R. Osborne
- Born: Michael Robert Osborne; 1969 (age 56–57)
- Education: University of Birmingham (BA, MA, Theology)
- Occupations: Writer; Translator; Solicitor
- Notable work: The Lessons of Lyons (2021); The Brazen Serpent: Chaos and Order (2022)
- Website: mrosborne.org

Michael Robert Osborne (born 1969) is an English writer, translator, and solicitor whose books concern Christian mysticism, Western esotericism, and philosophical alchemy. He is best known within Rosicrucian and Martinist study circles for English-language editions of eighteenth-century manuscripts associated with the Élus Coëns order founded by Martinez de Pasqually. He is a member of the American Academy of Religion, ESSWE, Authors Guild, and a practising Solicitor in England and Wales.

== Career ==
Osborne has authored multiple published works exploring the relationship between Western esotericism and Christian orthodoxy. His research includes analysis of the alchemical influences on William Blake and the theoretical connections between reported haunting experiences and time-slip phenomena. In Brazen Serpent: Chaos and Order he examines the "divine code" concealed within the biblical Nehushtan myth, and its association with the so-called 23 enigma. His work The Brazen Serpent was described by The Times Literary Supplement as "a good fit for those seeking spiritual enlightenment through alchemy, philosophy and Christianity." Montreal-based broadcaster Jonathan Stewart of the Gnostic Wisdom Network expressed the view that the publication of Osborne's translation of Pierre Fournié's What We Have Been, What We Are, And What We Will Become "was anticipated for over a decade."

Osborne is noted for his collaboration with Rose Circle Books on the English language editions of eighteenth-century manuscripts from the Order of Knight-Masons Elect Priests of the Universe. This collection includes The Lessons of Lyons, theTreatise on the Reintegration of Beings by Martinez de Pasqually, The de Grainville Manuscripts (also known as the Manuscript of Algiers). Piers Allfrey Vaughan, Grand First Principal of New York State, has commented on Osborne's work describing it as, "Well-researched and well-written." In 2022 he also published the first full colour restored edition of the Most Holy Trinosophia and the first translation into English of the text since Manly Palmer Hall's 1933 version.

Osborne is a member of the Societas Rosicruciana in Anglia (SRIA) and Director of Studies of the Society's Pythagoras College. In 2018, he won the prestigious Companion of Christian Rosenkreutz Prize for both his research papers on The Lessons of Lyon. The prize is described in The Square Magazine as an award in recognition of "Outstanding researches and scholarship rendered to the society." He contributes to Watkins' Mind, Body & Spirit Magazine, an internationally recognised publication on various subjects from contemporary spirituality to mysticism.

Three of Osborne's books have been the subject of long-form review essays on Via Hygeia, a specialist online "bibliotherapy" project devoted to wisdom and esoteric literature: The Most Holy Trinosophia (2021 edition), The Alchemy of William Blake ("Alchemy for the Algorithmic Age"), and Rosicrucian Death ("Wittgenstein and Bergson at the Café").

== Publications ==
- Osborne, M.R., The Lessons of Lyons (Rose Circle Publications, 2021, ISBN 979-8-89269-864-1)
- Osborne, M.R., The Brazen Serpent: Chaos and Order (Rose Circle Publications, 2022, ISBN 979-8-89298-315-0)
- Osborne, M.R., The Most Holy Trinosophia: A Book of the Dead (Rose Circle Publications, 2021, ISBN 979-8-88955-013-6, Library of Congress Number 2021917880)
- Osborne, M.R., Son of Perdition: The Magic and Hubris of Simon Magus (Rose Circle Publications, 2022, ISBN 979-8-89292-601-0)
- Osborne, M.R., Pierre Fournie: What We Have Been, What Are And What We Will Become (Rose Circle Publications, 2022, ISBN 979-8-89269-867-2)
- Osborne, M.R., Allegory in Stone: A Short Study of the Shakespeare Monument (Rose Circle Publications, 2022, ISBN 979-8-88796-954-1)
- Osborne, M.R., Time Slip Phenomena: The Ghosts of the Trianon, The Legend of Lucy Lightfoot and the Haunting of William Hogarth (Whitestone Esoteric, 2023, ISBN 979-8-89217-790-0)
- Osborne, M.R., Martinez de Pasqually: Treatise on the Reintegration of Beings (Rose Circle Publications, 2023, ISBN 979-8-89269-869-6)
- Osborne, M.R., The de Grainville Manuscripts (Rose Circle Publications, 2024, 979-8892698832)
- Osborne, M.R., The Alchemy of William Blake: The Three Principles of the Divine Essence and 'An Allegory on the Spiritual Condition of Man' (Rose Circle Publications, 2024, ISBN 979-8-89504-366-0)
- Osborne, M.R., The Threefold Anglican Ministry in the Writings of Thomas Cranmer, Richard Hooker and Jeremy Taylor (Whitestone Esoteric, 2024, ISBN 979-8-89660-925-4)
- Osborne, M.R., William Laud (1573–1645) Writings the Church, Ministry and Sacraments (Whitestone Esoteric, 2024, ISBN 979-8-89660-627-7)
- Osborne, M.R., Rosicrucian Death - The Manner and Meaning of Death in Modern Rosicrucianism (Rose Circle Publications, 2025) ISBN 978-1-0369677-03
- Osborne, M.R., John Thornborough - Lithotheorikos, Sive Nivhil, Aliquid, Omnia (Whitestone Esoteric, 2026) ISBN 978-1036960056
