= Écuyer =

Écuyer or Ecuyer is a French surname. Notable people with the surname include:

- Al Ecuyer (1937–2012), American football player
- Édouard Écuyer de le Court (1901–1951), Belgian Olympic modern pentathlete
- Émile Écuyer (1881–1952), French discus thrower

== See also ==
- Outline of écuyer
- Lecuyer
