= The Devil in Love =

The Devil in Love may refer to:

- The Devil in Love (film), a 1966 film by Ettore Scola
- The Devil in Love (novel), a 1772 novel by Jacques Cazotte
- The Devil in Love (opera), a Russian opera based on Cazotte's novel with music by Alexander Vustin
- The Devil in Love, a 1974 romance novel by Barbara Cartland

== See also ==
- The Devil's in Love, a 1933 American film
