= Barau =

Barau may refer to:

- Barau, German name for Bavorov, town in Strakonice District in the South Bohemian Region of the Czech Republic
- Suleimanu Barau, 6th emir of Abuja
- Barau's petrel, medium-sized gadfly petrel from the family Procellariidae
- Barau-Satan, a minor demon in the Élus Coëns tradition of Martinez de Pasqually
