= Dronov =

Dronov (Russian: Дронов) is a Russian masculine surname, its feminine counterpart is Dronova. It may refer to

- Aleksandr Dronov (born 1946), Russian chess player
- Aleksandr Dronov (politician) (born 1979), Russian politician
- Aleksei Dronov (born 2001), Russian boxer
- Grigori Dronov (born 1998), Russian ice hockey defenceman
- Igor Dronov (born 1963), Russian classical conductor
