= Slava Yastremski =

Russian-English translator (1952–2015)

Slava I. Yastremski (1952 Moscow - November 13, 2015 Lewisburg, Pennsylvania) was a Russian-American literary scholar, Professor of Russian and Comparative Humanities at Bucknell University.

Yastremski has written on Russian literature and cinema, and helped to translate work by Vasily Aksyonov, Marina Tsvetaeva, Andrei Sinyavsky, Olga Sedakova and the Russian Ukrainian writer Igor Klekh.

== Translations ==
- (tr. with Joel Wilkinson) Vassily Aksyonov, Surplussed Barrelware, 1985
- (tr. with Michael M. Naydan) Marina Tsvetaeva, After Russia, 1992
- (tr. with Catharine Theimer Nepomnyashchy) Andrei Sinyavsky, Strolls with Pushkin, 1993
- (tr. with Catriona Kelly, Michael M. Naydan, and Andrew Wachtel) Olga Sedakova, Poems and elegies, 2003. ISBN 978-0-8387-5558-7
- (tr. with Michael M. Naydan) Igor Klekh, A Land The Size Of Binoculars, 2004
