= Jean-Louis de Biasi =

French philosopher

Jean-Louis de Biasi is a French writer, lecturer, Freemason, and publisher.

== Career ==
He is a specialist in Ancient Mediterranean religions, classical philosophy, Freemasonry, and spiritual/religious rituals in the Western Tradition. In Freemasonry he is a Master Mason and Past Master. He also received the 32° of the American Scottish Rite in Washington, D.C., and was initiated into Royal Arch Masonry in Canada.

In 1997 Biasi founded La Parole Circule (Spread the Word), the first-ever online magazine of international scope devoted to Freemasonry and restricted to Freemasons. It was published until 2008. He was also one of the founders of the online community of Fraternelle des Internautes Francophones, the first French Masonic one to be established.

== Published works ==
=== Books ===
Excerpts from his bibliography (books and their foreign editions):

- Secrets and Practices of the Freemasons, Llewellyn Publications, Woodbury, MN, 2010. (Portuguese Editions: Europa-America Publications, Portugal & Agora Hermetica Publications, Fortaleza, BR, 2012. Dutch Edition: AnkhHermes Publications, Utrecht, 2012.)ABC de l'Aura (ABC of the Aura), Grancher, Paris, 1997 & 2000.
- Mysteries of the Aura, Llewellyn Publications, Woodbury, MN, 2023.
- The Magical Use of Prayer Beads, Llewellyn Publications, Woodbury, MN, 2016.
- Hidden Mandala Coloring Book, Llewellyn Publications, Woodbury, MN, 2017.
- Esoteric Freemasonry, Llewellyn Publications, Woodbury, MN, 2018.
- Rediscover the Magick of the Gods and Goddesses, Llewellyn Publications, Woodbury, MN, 2014.
- Le martinisme (Martinism), Sepp, Paris, 1997. (Spanish Edition: Manakel Publications, Madrid, SP.)
- Les rites maçonniques égyptiens en franc-maçonnerie (The Egyptian Rituals in Freemasonry), Edimaf, Paris, 2001.
- L'énergie du Tarot (The Energy of the Tarot), Grancher, Paris, 2004.
- ABC de spiritualité maçonnique (ABC of Freemasonic Spirituality), Grancher, Paris, 2006.
- ABC de kabbale chrétienne (ABC of Christian Kabbalah), Grancher, Paris, 2008. (Portuguese Edition: Madras Publications, Brazil)
- ABC de l'ésotérisme maçonnique (ABC of Esoteric Freemasonry), Grancher, Paris, 2009.
- ABC de la Magie sacrée (ABC of Sacred Magic), Grancher, Paris, 2010. (Portuguese Edition: Academia Platonica, Las Vegas.)
- The Divine Arcana of the Aurum Solis, Llewellyn Publications, Woodbury, MN, 2011. (Portuguese Edition: Agora Hermetica Publications, Fortaleza, BR, 2012.)
- Livres sacrés hermétistes (The Hermetic Sacred Books), Academia Platonica Publications, Las Vegas, 2012. Currently published by Theurgia.
- Luz sobre a Iniciaçao (Light upon Initiation), Madras Publications, São Paulo, BR, 2012.
- Harmonizaçoes astrologicas (Astrologic Harmonizations), Agora Hermetica Publications, Fortaleza, BR, 2012.

=== CDs ===
- Initiation à la relaxation (Relaxation), Academia Platonica, 2004. Currently published by Theurgia.
- Cagliostro et l’oracle de la colombe (Cagliostro), Academia Platonica, 2004. Currently published by Theurgia.
- Enochian Sounds, Academia Platonica, 2005. Currently published by Theurgia.
- Les rites maçonniques (Masonic Rituals), Academia Platonica, 2005. Currently published by Theurgia.
- Cours de Tarot (Tarot Courses), Academia Platonica, 2010. Currently published by Theurgia.

=== Art ===
- The Aurum Solis Tarot Deck and Booklet, Academia Platonica, 2011. Currently published by Theurgia.
