= Treatise on the Reintegration of Beings =

1773 book by Martinès de Pasqually

- Author: Martinès de Pasqually
- Original title: Traité de la Réintégration des êtres
- Language: French
- Subject: Martinezism
- Publisher: Éditions Robert Dumas (French edition); Septentrione Books (English edition)
- Publication date: 1773?
- Publication place: France
- English publication date: 2007

The Treatise on the Reintegration of Beings into Their Original Estate, Virtues and Powers both Spiritual and Divine (French: Traité de la Réintégration des êtres dans leurs premières propriétés, vertus et puissance spirituelles et divines) is a book written in 1772-73 by Martinès de Pasqually.

Initially, the book was intended as an internal document and doctrine for the Order of Knight-Masons Elect Priests of the Universe, founded by Pasqually. After the death of Pasqually, the book outgrew the narrow framework of the Order, having influenced the spiritual and philosophical life of its time. It continues to influence occultism, mysticism, and spiritual philosophy as several Martinist organizations and orders around the world consider it one of the fundamental books of their tradition.

== Characteristic ==
The theosopher Pasqually wanted to understand the world from the religion, through inner reflection and illumination, he discovered God and the world. The Treatise is a commentary by him to the Pentateuch of Moses, specially for two reasons:

- It was the sum of instructions for those who were initiated into the Order of Elect Priests;
- It is a commentary to the Pentateuch of Moses, made precisely from the standpoint of mysticism and theurgy, including operating instructions. Pasqually wrote these commentaries using gematria, Kabbalistic methods, Rosicrucian symbolism, Pythagorean-numerical mysticism, and elements of Neoplatonic philosophy.

Strictly speaking, however, the Treatise itself can not be regarded as Jewish-Kabbalistic. The doctrine of the Elect Priests sustained in the style of Christian Cabbalah, and had absorbed many ideas of the followers of this Renaissance movement. The final synthesis of these ideas led them to a coherent and orderly scheme, both philosophical and ideological. A work written in an apocalyptic style, the main purpose is to describe the spiritual hierarchy of the universe, then to offer the key to understand the still-continuing miserable situation of mankind, and to indicate the way out this situation.

=== Christological aspect ===
According to Pasqually's teachings, Jesus Christ is the uncreated Word of God through whom the world is created. He is the King of Glory, and the Great Architect of the Universe, who is worshiped by Freemasons in their lodges.

According to the Treatise, the name Jesus is the true word that is lost among the Freemasons. Also, it is the Pentagrammaton—a holy name—or a formula that is used by the Rosicrucians. If the name 'Jesus' is written according to the Kabbalistic method, which is common in the Renaissance mysticism, we get five letters 'יהשוה'. The idea is to get the name of Jesus by adding the Hebrew letter shin (ש) to the middle of the Tetragrammaton 'יהוה'. Pasqually taught that, in time, the name Jeshua (Jesus) corresponds to the timeless unpronounceable name of Yahweh (יהוה).

== Doctrine ==
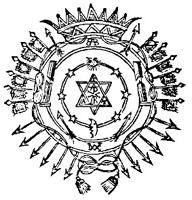
Seal of Martinès de Pasqually

According to the Treatise, the doctrine of Martinès de Pasqually holds an eschatological cosmology close to the Judeo-Christian view: God, as the original unity, wished to emanate beings from his own essence. But Lucifer, who sought to fulfill his creative power, became victim to his own misdeed, being confined to a place along with other major fallen spirits that God has prepared for them as a prison.

Then, God sent a man in his androgynous body, endowed him with great powers. Following the chronology of the events described in the Book of Genesis, Pasqually concludes that man is the 'junior creature', because he appeared at the end of the Creation. Initially, man was created by the Lord as an androgyne, in a glorious body, not subject to decay and death. The Lord created man for the fulfillment of two important things on a cosmic scale: so that a person could replace the hierarchy of fallen spirits who rebelled against the Lord and were cast out of heaven, and, accordingly, no longer fulfilling their duty in the Divine Purpose; in order to keep the rebels, or, as Pasqually called them the 'spoiled creatures' under constant control, facilitating their reconciliation with God and the speedy correction of their nature.

However, Adam stepped back from his duties, and he himself fell in the prison, which he was instructed to watch over. He became a material and mortal being, and now he must make an effort to save himself and all of the original creation.

The fall of Adam led man to the loss of the original shining (glorious) body, and to its transformation into the present material body. In this regard, a person has lost the ability to think independently, and all the thoughts are the result of suggestions by good or fallen spirits. Therefore, the man doesn't have the right of choice—the freedom of will—through which he can reject bad suggestions and choose the good, or on the contrary, thereby bringing himself into a state of even greater enslavement and dependence on the 'spoiled creatures'. The most important thing that man lost, according to Pasqually, is the direct communication with God.

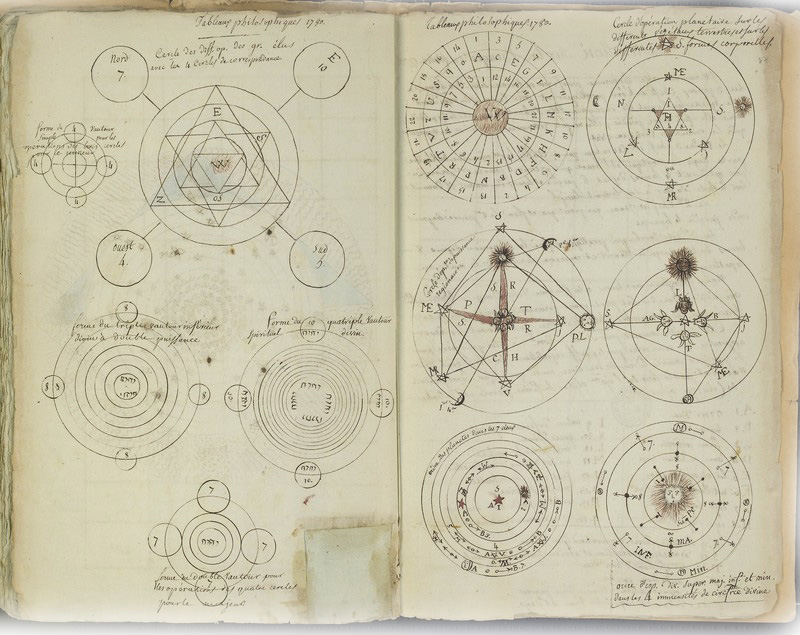
Léonard Joseph Prunelle de Lière's Élus Coëns notebook with the seals of spirits of both good angels and evil demons

In order to achieve reconciliation with God, the incarnation of Jesus Christ was necessary, which by preaching, suffering, death, and resurrection laid the foundation for reconciliation, and the Reintegration of the present generation of mankind. Previous generations, according to the Treatise, were reconciled by the most vivid Old Testament saints and prophets: Seth, Enoch, Noah, Abraham, Moses, and Elijah. For the final stage of reconciliation, it took Divine Condescension, that is, the incarnation of Jesus Christ. However, in order to follow the path of the Reintegration, according to the teachings of Pasqually, one should follow the path of internal self-perfection, and also make good use of the theurgic operations that Pasqually taught to the 'men of desire', whom he found worthy of initiation. Through these operations, the disciples must enter into relations with the angelic entities, which 'pass through' the theurgic operations. These angelic entities appear in their characteristic images or in the form of their hieroglyphic symbols (hieroglyphs of angelic names used in the drawings of circles and words of power for the Élus Coëns ceremonial magic) to prove that the operator is on the right path of Reintegration. To attract the faithful to the Lord, the good angels follow the operation of an external cult, which is the theurgy passed along the initiatory chain from Noah to the Order of the Elected Priests (Élus Coëns). The preparation to perform a theurgic ceremonial followed by fasting and prayer.

According to the British mystic Arthur Edward Waite, Martinès de Pasqually was the Grand Sovereign, Grand Magus and Operator of the Rite. In his book Saint-Martin: The French Mystic and the Story of Modern Martinism (1922), Waite made a brief summary of the rite and doctrine of the Order of Élus Coëns ('Elect Priesthood' as mentioned by Waite):

It (the Rite) was concerned with the communication of a secret doctrine by way of direct instruction and with a practice which must be called secret in the ordinary sense which attaches to the idea of occult art or science. The kind of practice was that which endeavours to establish communication with unseen intelligence by the observances of Ceremonial Magic [...] It will be seen in a word that the Rite of Elect Priesthood had a very different undertaking in hand from anything embraced by the horizon of Craft Masonry or the rank and file of High Grades. The doctrine embodied a particular view concerning the Fall of Man and of all animated things belonging to the material order; it looked for the restoration of all, and on man as the divinely appointed agent of that great work to come.

== Publication ==
There are two versions of the work. The first, the so-called 'original version', was published by the Martinist researcher Robert Amadou in 1974, in Paris by Éditions Robert Dumas. The second version was also discovered by Robert Amadou, in 1978, known as the 'manuscript of Saint-Martin'. A facsimile of this version, was published by one of the Rosicrucian almanacs of France in 1993, under the title Traité sur la Réintégration des êtres. An English translation of the 'manuscript of Saint-Martin' has been published by the Traditional Martinist Order in 2018, and more recently by M.R. Osborne.

== Influence ==
The Treatise on the Reintegration of Beings had an impact on the development of both mystical and spiritual movements in Freemasonry and all the trends of European mysticism of the 19th and 20th centuries. The Treatise was known even in the 18th-century Russian Empire, in versions that have not survived to this day.

Jacques Cazotte is one of the early French-Martinist figures, author of the occult romance The Devil in Love and Ollivier, poème, who was initiated into the Order of Elect Priests by Martinès de Pasqually himself. Cazotte himself claimed that it was due to Pasqually that he turned from atheism to Christianity.

The teachings of Pasqually inspired the 'occult revival' in France at the end of the 19th and early 20th centuries. Specialists of the Martinist Order included such occult figures as Papus, Constant Chevillon, Éliphas Lévi, Joséphin Péladan, Jean Bricaud, Maurice Barrès, Stanislas de Guaita, Henri-Charles Détré, among others. Their activities and books bear the imprint of Pasqually's teachings.

In the 20th century, the Order of Elect Priests was revived by Robert Ambelain in 1942 under the name Ordre Martiniste des Élus Cohens. Today, the doctrine of the Treatise is still taught at several Martinist orders. The Ordre Reaux Croix, which was founded in 2002 by a group of Norwegian Martinists, has the Élus Coëns as their theurgical branch.
