= Olga Sedakova =

Olga Sedakova may refer to:

- Olga Sedakova (poet) (born 1949), Russian poet
- Olga Sedakova (synchronized swimmer) (born 1972), Olympic synchronized swimmer competing for Soviet Union and Russia
