= Reintegration =

Reintegration may refer to:

- Reintegration (Martinism), the basic doctrine of Martinism
- Reintegrationism, the linguistic and cultural movement in Galicia which defends the unity of Galician and Portuguese as a single language
- Social integration, the movement of minority groups of a society into the mainstream of the society
