= Encyclopedia of Yverdon =

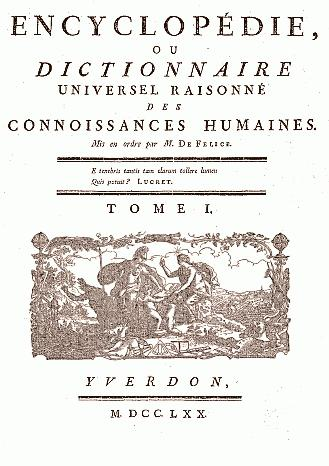

The Encyclopedia of Yverdon (French: Encyclopédie d'Yverdon) is an encyclopedia compiled by Fortunato Bartolomeo de Félice and published in 58 volumes from 1770 through 1780 in Yverdon, Switzerland. The Encyclopedia of Yverdon is not as culturally French nor as philosophically skeptical of religion as the work it is based upon, the Encyclopédie of Diderot and d'Alembert. Due to these differences, the Encyclopedia of Yverdon was known as the "Protestant encyclopedia" and was widely distributed across Northern Europe.

== Principal contributors ==
The Italian scholar Fortunato de Félice emigrated to Bern, Switzerland, in 1757 and finally resettled in Yverdon, Switzerland, in 1762. To advance his encyclopedia, Félice brought together more than thirty international collaborators. Fifteen of his contributors were Swiss, twelve French, three German, one Italian, and one Irish. They include:

- Jean-Henri Andrié: contributed more than 4,200 articles on Geography.
- Charles-Louis-François Andry
- Elie Bertrand
- Carlo Barletti
- Louis de Bons
- Jean-Henri-Nicolas Bouillet
- Nicolas-Maximilien Bourgeois
- Louis Claude Cadet de Gassicourt
- Alexandre César Chavannes
- Jacques-Antoine-Henri Deleuze: contributed 1,030 articles on botany and natural history.
- Johann Heinrich Samuel Formey
- Henri-Sébastien Dupuy de Bordes
- Leonhard Euler
- Johann Euler
- André Ferry
- Hieronymus David Gaubius
- Mathieu-Bernard Goudin
- Gottlieb Emanuel von Haller
- Albrecht von Haller
- Samuel-Rodolphe Jeanneret
- Joseph Jérôme Lefrançois de Lalande
- Lecuyer
- Paul-Gabriel Le Preux
- Joseph Lieutaud
- Antoine Louis
- Archibald Maclaine
- Pierre-Joseph Macquer
- Gabriel Mingard
- David Perrelet
- Antoine Portal
- Johann Rudolf Sinner
- Jacob Reinhold Spielmann
- Johann Christoph Erich von Springer
- Vincent-Bernard de Tscharner
- Paul-Joseph Vallet
- Pierre-Jacques Willermoz

== The Encyclopedia of Yverdon by the numbers ==
- published from 1770 through 1780
- 58 quarto volumes
  - 42 volumes of articles
  - 6 volumes of supplemental articles
  - 10 volumes of plates, with 1200 figures
  - about 37,378 pages
- about 75,000 articles
- sales: between 2,500 and 3,000 copies

== Bibliography ==
- Donato, Clorinda et Doig, Kathleen, Notices sur les auteurs des quarante-huit volumes de "Discours" de l'Encyclopédie d'Yverdon, Recherches sur Diderot et sur l'Encyclopédie, 1991, n° 11, p. 133-141.
- Jean-Daniel Candaux, Alain Cernuschi et al., L'encyclopédie d'Yverdon et sa résonance européenne : contextes, contenus, continuités, Genève, Slatkine, 2005
- Léonard Burnand, Alain Cernuschi, Circulation de matériaux entre l'Encyclopédie d'Yverdon et quelques dictionnaires spécialisés. In : Dix-huitième siècle, 2006, n° 38 (ISBN 978-2-70715010-3), p. 253 à 267.
