= Marc Haven =

French doctor and ocultist

Emmanuel Lalande (24 December 1868 – 31 August 1926), known as Marc Haven, was a French doctor and occultist. He was one of Papus’ most faithful companions and the son-in-law of Maître Philippe. He was also a member of the first Supreme Council of the Ordre Martiniste.

== Bibliography ==
=== Works by Marc Haven ===
- Turris Eburnea, Chamuel, 1892
- La Vie et les œuvres de Maître Arnaud de Villeneuve, Chamuel, 1896
- Le Maître Inconnu Cagliostro, Dorbon aîné, 1912
- Le Tarot, l’Alphabet Hébraïque et les Nombres, Derain, 1937
- Le Corps, le cœur de l’homme et l’esprit, Derain, 1961

=== Translations ===
- Henri Corneille Agrippa, La magie d’Arbatel, Henri Durville, 1910
- Alessandro Cagliostro, L’Évangile de Cagliostro, Librairie Hermétique, 1910
- LAO TSEU, Tao Te King, Dervy, 1994

=== Prefaces ===
- Paracelse, Les Sept livres de l’Archidoxe magique, Librairie du Merveilleux, 1909
- Jacques Gaffarel, Profonds mystères de la Cabale divine, Beaudelot, 1912
- Karl D'Eckarthausen, La Nuée sur le sanctuaire, Museum Hermeticum, 1914
- Mutus Liber, Derain, 1942
- Philippe D'Aquin, Interprétation de l’arbre de la Cabale, Cahiers Astrologiques, 1946
- Heinrich Khunrath, L’Amphithéâtre de la Sagesse Éternelle, Derain, 1946

=== Books on Marc Haven ===
- Mme Emmanuel Lalande, Marc Haven [docteur Emmanuel Lalande], Pythagore, 1934
