= Pierre-Jacques Willermoz =

French physician and chemist

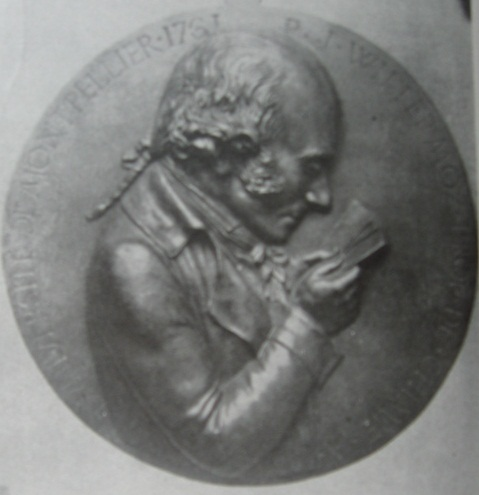
- Born: 28 August 1735; Lyon
- Died: 26 June 1799 (aged 63)
- Occupations: Physician; Chemist

Pierre-Jacques Willermoz (28 August 1735 – 26 June 1799) was an 18th-century French physician and chemist.

== Biography ==
Pierre-Jacques Willermoz was the son of Claude Catherine Willermoz (1701–1770) and his wife Marguerite Catherine Valentin (born 1710). Among his 12 other siblings were Jean-Baptiste Willermoz (1730–1824), Pierre Willermoz (1734–1793) and Antoine Willermoz (1741–1793).

In 1761, Willermoz was appointed professor demonstrator of chemistry at the University of Montpellier but he resigned this chair in 1763 and returned to Lyon, where, on the advice of his friends, he opened a course of chemistry which proved very busy. Having been aggregated to the college of physicians of this city, he continued to devote to scientific research the leisure left to him by the exercise of his art.

The Académie des sciences belles-lettres et arts de Lyon, whose records contain three unreleased texts, admitted him in its midst. Bound by a close friendship with the agronomist François Rozier, he was no stranger to the writing of the latter's Dictionnaire universel d’agriculture. He also collaborated with the Encyclopédie by Diderot and D'Alembert, as well as with the Encyclopédie ou dictionnaire universel raisonné des connaissances humaines.

== Sources ==
- Joseph-Marie Quérard, La France littéraire, t. 10, Paris, Firmin-Didot, 1839, (p. 518).
- Alice Joly; Jean Lacassagne; Jean Rousset; Lucien Michel; Joseph Chinard; Pierre-Alexandre Tardieu: Pierre-Jacques Willermoz: Médecin lyonnais (1735–1799). Éditions de La Guillotière, 1938
