= The Devil in Love (opera) =

Russian language opera by Alexander Vustin

- Opera by Alexander Vustin
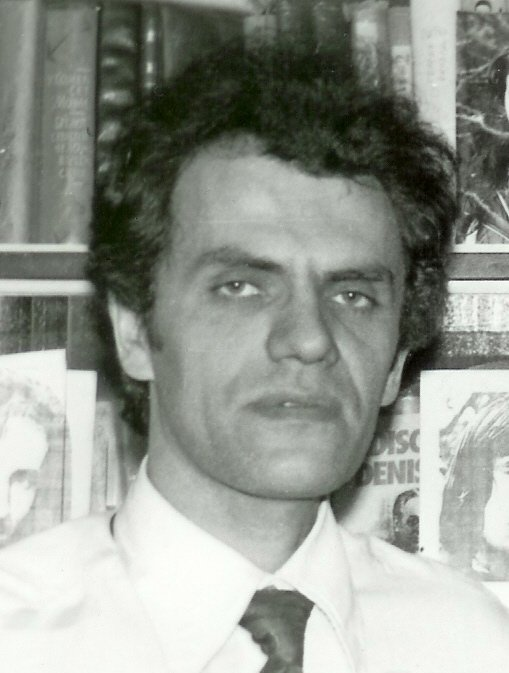
- The composer in 1983
- Native title: Влюблённый дьявол
- Librettist: Vladimir Khachaturov
- Language: Russian
- Based on: The Devil in Love by Jacques Cazotte
- Premiere: 15 February 2019; Stanislavski and Nemirovich-Danchenko Theatre, Moscow

The Devil in Love (French: Le Diable amoureux; Russian: Влюблённый дьявол, romanized: Vlyublyonny dyavol) is an opera in three acts by Alexander Vustin. The libretto was written in Russian by Vladimir Khachaturov, based on the 1732 novel The Devil in Love by Jacques Cazotte. Completed in 1989, it was premiered on 15 February 2019 at the Stanislavski and Nemirovich-Danchenko Theatre in Moscow.

== History ==
Alexander Vustin composed The Devil in Love to a libretto in Russian by Vladimir Khachaturov, based on the 1732 novel The Devil in Love by Jacques Cazotte. He worked on the opera for around 15 years, from 1975 to 1989. The work was first intended to be a short chamber opera, but grew due to the inclusion of more plot lines. It became a work in three acts and eight scenes. Vustin used similar musical material as in other compositions written during the same period. It was published by Boosey and Hawkes.

The opera was premiered in a two-act version on 15 February 2019 to mark the centenary season of the Stanislavski and Nemirovich-Danchenko Theatre in Moscow. The conductor was Vladimir Jurowski and the director Alexander Titel. The production team won the 2019 Onegin Award.

== Plot and scoring ==
As in the play, the devil is attracted to a young man, Alvare, and assumes several incarnations, including a girl, Biondetta. The topic is reminiscent of the Faust myth, but in the play and the opera, the devil becomes more and more human, and the girl is ultimately freed by her love from supernatural powers.

The opera requires two sopranos, mezzo-soprano, two contraltos, two tenors, two baritones, two basses, a small chorus and dancers. The core instrumentation follows Stravinsky's L'Histoire du soldat, employing clarinet, trumpet, trombone, percussion, violin and double bass. It ultimately consisted of 2 flutes (II = piccolo), 5 clarinets (II = bass clarinet, III = alto saxophone, IV = tenor saxophone, V = bass saxophone), trumpet, trombone, percussion (7 players; percussion 1: wood blocks / temple blocks; percussion 2: cymbals / gongs / tam-tams; percussion 3: tom-toms / drums; percussion 4-7: tubular bells / vibraphone / marimba / castanets / 5 tartafruge / whip / hammer / guiro / ratchet / washboard / 2 maracas / rattle / hi-hat / flexatone / tambourine / tamburo (side drum) / cassa (bass drum) / pedal timpani / flauto a culisse / large siren / ruggitso del leone) / keyboards (piano / celesta / harpsichord / electronic organ / synthesizer), 12 violins, 1 double-bass.

Vustin assigned certain instruments and singing styles to the characters. Alvare uses declamation, and is accompanied by violin and trumpet, while Biondetta is songful, accompanied by three saxophones. In an extended love duet, Alvare turns more to singing, and the instrumental colours are more and more mixed.

The composer characterised the opera as a "scene for voices and instruments with games and dancing ad libitum". While the beginning has lively action such as billiard games, disputes and transformations, the inner world of the protagonists becomes the focus for most of the opera.
