= Augustin Chaboseau =

Augustin Chaboseau (17 June 1868 – 2 January 1946) was the original organizer and promulgation officer of the Traditional Martinist Order (TMO), Occultist and Historian.

Notably, his founding was in partnership with Papus in 1888. In his early years, he trained as a medical doctor and it was with the knowledge gained from working with the responsibility of saving people's lives that he was able to successfully transition into his work with the TMO.

He contributed to numerous journals and was the author of an essay on Buddhist philosophy (1891) and a History of Brittany before the thirteenth century (1926).
