= Jacques Cazotte =

French writer (1719–1792)

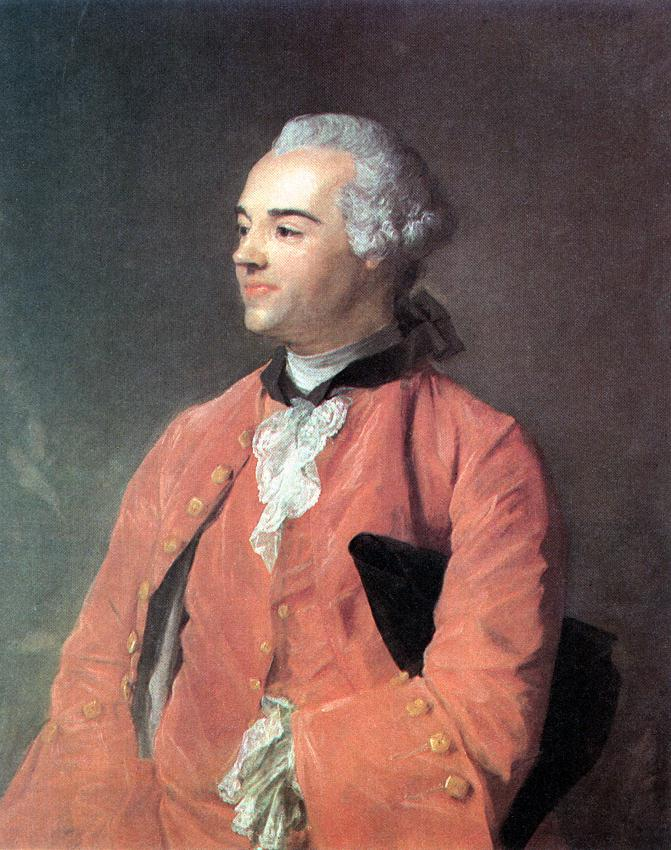
- Detail of portrait by Jean-Baptiste Perronneau
- Born: Jacques Cazotte; 17 October 1719; Dijon, France
- Died: 25 September 1792 (aged 72); Paris, France
- Occupation: Writer

Jacques Cazotte (French: [kazɔt]; 17 October 1719 – 25 September 1792) was a French writer and a monarchist. He predicted the Reign of Terror and was guillotined shortly after.

== Life ==
Born in Dijon, he was educated by the Jesuits. Cazotte then worked for the French Ministry of the Marine. From 1747 to 1759, he was a colonial administrator on Martinique, working for the Department of the Marine. Due to ill health, he returned to France in 1759.

It was not until his return to Paris in 1760 with the rank of commissioner-general that he made his public debut as an author. His first attempts, a mock romance and a coarse song, gained so much popularity, both in the Court and among the people, that he was encouraged to try something more ambitious. He accordingly produced his romance, Les Prouesses inimitables d'Ollivier, marquis d'Edesse.

Cazotte wrote a number of fantastic oriental tales, such as his children's fairy tale La patte du chat (The Cat's Paw, 1741) and the humorous Mille et une fadaises, Contes a dormir debout (The Thousand and One Follies, Tales to Sleep Upright 1742). His first success was with a "poem" in twelve cantos, and in prose intermixed with verse, entitled Ollivier (2 vols, 1762), followed in 1771 by another romance, the Lord Impromptu. But the most popular of his works was Le Diable amoureux (The Devil in Love, 1772), a fantastic tale in which the hero raises the Devil. The value of the story lies in the picturesque setting, and the skill with which its details are carried out.

Cazotte copy-edited, adapted, and expanded French translations of tales actually and supposedly belonging to the Thousand and One Nights provided to him by the Syrian priest Dom Denis Chavis. These stories were published in Geneva in 1788–89, independently as Continuation des Mille et Une Nuits and, in the Cabinet des Fées anthology, as Suites des Mille et Une Nuits (1788–1789).

Cazotte possessed such extreme facility that he is said to have dashed off a seventh canto of Voltaire's Guerre civile de Genève in a single night. Circa 1775, Cazotte embraced the creed of the Illuminati and declared himself possessed of the power of prophecy. It was upon this event that Jean-François de la Harpe based his famous jeu d'esprit, in which he represents Cazotte as prophesying the most minute events of the French Revolution. Near the end of his life, Cazotte became a follower of the Martinist mysticism of Martinez de Pasqually, and became a "mystical monarchist". Upon the discovery of some of his counter-revolutionary letters in August 1792, Cazotte was arrested. He escaped for a time through the efforts of his daughter but was guillotined in September.

== Writings ==
A complete edition of his work was published as the Œuvres badines et morales, historiques et philosophiques de Jacques Cazotte (4 vols, 1816–1817), though more than one collection appeared during his lifetime. Cazotte's work was an influence on later fantasy writers such as E. T. A. Hoffmann, Charles Nodier, Gérard de Nerval and Théophile Gautier.

- Prophetie de Cazotte (Reputed)
- Ollivier, 1762.
- Le Diable amoureux (The Devil in Love), 1772.
- A Thousand and One Follies, and His Most Unlooked-for Lordship. Translated by Eric Sutton, with an introduction by Storm Jameson, 1927.
- Continuation des Mille et Une Nuits (1788-1789): Cazotte edited many of the tales and invented some of them.
