= Martinism =

Form of Christian mysticism and esoteric Christianity

Martinism is a form of Christian mysticism and esoteric Christianity concerned with the fall of the first man, his materialistic state of being deprived of his own divine source, and the process of his eventual (if not inevitable) return, called 'Reintegration'.

Seal of Martinism

As a mystical tradition, it was first transmitted through a Masonic high-degree system established around 1740 in France by Martinez de Pasqually, and later propagated in different forms by his two students Louis Claude de Saint-Martin and Jean-Baptiste Willermoz.

The term Martinism applies to both this particular doctrine and the teachings of the reorganized "Martinist Order" founded in 1886 by Augustin Chaboseau and Gérard Encausse (aka Papus). It was not used at the tradition's inception in the 18th century. This confusing disambiguation has been a problem since the late 18th century, where the term Martinism was already used interchangeably between the teachings of Louis-Claude de Saint-Martin and Martinez de Pasqually, and the works of the first being attributed to the latter.

== Three branches ==
Martinism can be divided into three forms through which it has been chronologically transmitted: the theurgic tradition of Martinez de Pasqually (Martinezism), the Masonic Templarism of Jean-Baptiste Willermoz (Willermozism) and the Christian Theosophy of Louis-Claude de Saint-Martin. This heritage was reorganized into the 'Ordre Martiniste' in 1886 by Augustin Chaboseau and Gerard Encausse (also known as Papus).

=== The Élus Coëns ===
The Élus Coëns (Cohen being the Hebrew for "priest" and "Elus" means "the elect" or "the chosen") was the first, and explicitly theurgical, way that 'reintegration' was to be attained. The Élus Coëns were founded by Martinez de Pasqually, who was Saint-Martin's teacher. The original Élus Coëns ceased to exist sometime in the late eighteenth or early 19th century, but it was revived in the 20th century by Robert Ambelain, and lives on today in various Martinist Orders, including the branch reinstigated by Ambelain himself.

In the highest of the three degrees of the Order of the Élus Coën, known as the Shrine, itself consisting of three degrees of which the highest was the Master Reau-Crois, evocation of entities belonging to the Divine Plane was carried out. This makes clear that the Élus Coëns were not merely a mystical but a magical order. The chief evocation was that of the 'Mender', Jehoshua, and the basic methods were those of the Key of Solomon, including the use of circles, names of angels, planetary hours and symbols. The magical operations of the lower degrees were intended to establish contact between the operator and the Invisible World. Lofty and beautiful prayers recalled the goal which the Order tried to attain. There were also exorcisms intended to strangle demonic influence in the universe and thwart its powers over men, and to combat black magic.

=== The Scottish Rectified Rite or Chevaliers Bienfaisants de la Cité-Sainte (CBCS) ===
This was originally a Masonic rite, a reformed variant of the Rite of Strict Observance which, in its highest degrees, uses Masonic-type rituals to demonstrate the philosophy which underlies both Martinism and the practices of the Élus Coëns. The CBCS was founded in the late 18th century by Jean-Baptiste Willermoz, who was a pupil of Martinez de Pasqually and a friend of Saint-Martin. The CBCS has managed to survive as a continually practiced rite from its founding until the present day, both as a purely masonic rite, and as a detached rite which is also open to women.

=== Louis-Claude de Saint-Martin ===
The Martinism of Louis-Claude de Saint-Martin is a mystical tradition in which emphasis is placed on meditation and inner spiritual alchemy. Saint-Martin disapproved of these teachings being called 'martinism' by his contemporaries, and instead explained it as a silent 'way of the heart' to attain reintegration. Saint-Martin most likely did not organize this path as an 'order', but gathered small circles of students around him, where he transmitted his teachings.

In a nutshell, the Martinism as we know it today consists of the theurgic tradition of Martinez de Pasqually (Martinezism), the Masonic Templarism of Jean-Baptiste Willermoz (Willermozism) and the Christian Theosophy of Louis-Claude de Saint-Martin. This heritage was reorganized into the 'Ordre Martiniste' in 1886 by Augustin Chaboseau and Gerard Encausse (also known as Papus).

== Martinezism: Martinez de Pasqually and the Élus Coëns ==
Jacques de Livron Joachim de la Tour de la Casa Martinez de Pasqually was born in c. 1727 in Grenoble, France, and died in 1774 in Saint-Domingue while dealing with profane business. Martinez de Pasqually was active in Masonic organisations throughout France from the age of 28 onwards. In 1765 he established l'Ordre des Chevaliers Maçons Élus Coëns de l'Univers (Order of Knight-Masons Elect Priests of the Universe), which functioned as a regular Masonic obedience in France.

This order had three sets of degrees: the first were analogous to the symbolic degrees of conventional Freemasonry. The second were generally Masonic, though hinting at Pasqually's own secret doctrine. The third set were blatantly magical: for example, by using exorcisms against evil in the world generally and in the individual specifically. In the highest degree, the Reaux-Croix, the initiate was taught to use Theurgy to contact spiritual realms beyond the physical.

De Pasqually put forth the philosophy underlying the work of the Élus Coëns in his only book, Treatise on the Reintegration of Beings, which first uses the analogy of the Garden of Eden, and refers to Christ as "The Repairer". The ultimate aim of the Élus Coën was to attain – whilst living – the beatific vision through a series of magical invocations and complex theurgic operations.

After Martinez de Pasqually's death, the Élus Coëns continued to operate for some time; however, divisions started to occur between various temples, which became dormant during the first half of the 19th century. The last-known surviving Élus Coën from the original incarnation of the order, Destigny, died in 1868.

== Louis-Claude de Saint-Martin ==
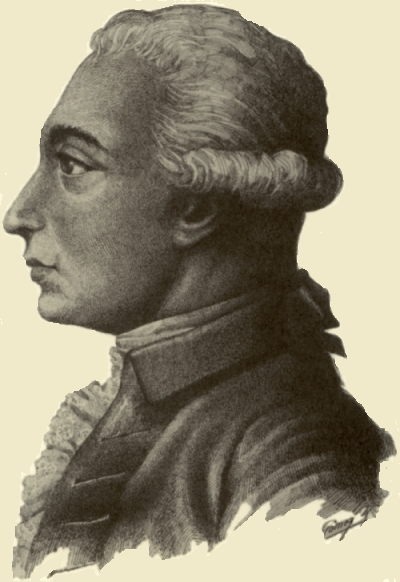
Louis-Claude de Saint-Martin, the unknown philosopher

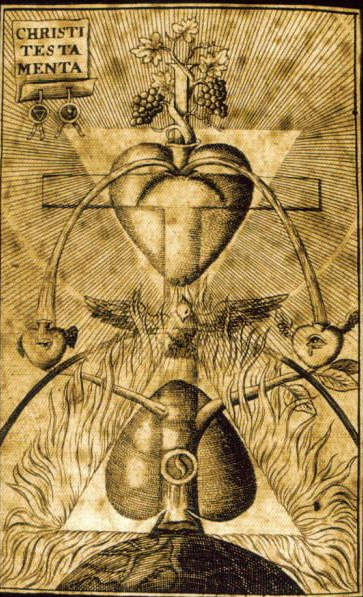
'Christi Testamenta' by Jakob Böhme, which may represent the "way of the heart"

Louis-Claude de Saint-Martin was born in 1743 in Amboise, France, and died in 1803. He was originally a barrister before taking a commission in the army at Bordeaux. Saint-Martin was initiated into the Élus Coëns in 1768 and was active in the organization for at least six years. Saint-Martin was initiated into the Reaux-Croix, the highest degree of the Order, and in 1770 became de Pasqually's secretary.

Saint-Martin became increasingly dissatisfied with the Élus Coëns' use of theurgic ritual, feeling that it was too sophisticated for the desired end. Instead, he favoured inward contemplation, or what he called "The Way of the Heart". Nevertheless, Saint-Martin continued to acknowledge Martinez de Pasqually's influence on his own system of thought. In addition, Saint-Martin drew much inspiration from the work of Jakob Böhme.

In 1777, after failing to convince the Élus Coëns to adopt a more contemplative practice, he cut back his involvement in the Order. He ceased all involvement in 1790.

Saint-Martin outlined his philosophy in several books, using the pen name of "The Unknown Philosopher". These include:

- Ecce Homo
- Of Errors and Truth, 1775
- The Man of Desire
- The New Man
- Man, His True Nature & Ministry
- Aphorisms and Maxims
- The Spiritual Ministry of Man
- Ten Prayers
- The Red Book
- Theosophic Correspondence
- Natural Table of the Correspondences between God, Man and the Universe, 1782

Note: the books with the name Man or l'homme in French are retellings of Saint-Martin of the main teachings of Martinez de Pasqually and what he learned in Martinezism mixed with Boehme.

There has been some controversy over whether Saint-Martin himself ever founded a formalised Order of Martinists. For example, 20th-century Martinist author Robert Ambelain initially claimed that Saint-Martin founded an order called the "Society of Initiates", but within a few years he became disillusioned with the concept and stated that the Society of Initiates never existed. Others allege that Saint-Martin became involved in a pre-existing society called the "Order of Unknown Philosophers".

== Willermoz and the Scottish Rectified Rite ==
Jean-Baptiste Willermoz (born 1730, Lyon, France; died 1824 also at Lyon), was initiated into Masonry at the age of 20 in a lodge which operated under the auspices of the Strict Observance. He was initiated into the Élus Coën in 1767, eventually attaining the highest degree of the Order, and being named by de Pasqually as a "Superior Judge," one of its most senior officers.

Concerned about dissent in the order after the death of de Pasqually, Willermoz in 1778, together with two other Superior Judges, formulated the idea of creating two additional degrees for the Auvergne Province of the Strict Observance, which exemplified the philosophy, though not the theurgic practices, of the Élus Coëns, while working in the Knight Templar-oriented milieu of the masonic rite. The name of the rite was changed to Chevaliers Beneficient de la Cité-Sainte (CBCS). The degree structure of the rite was thus:

1. Apprentice
2. Fellowcraft
3. Master
4. Maître Ecossais/Scotch Master
5. Ecuyer Novice/Squire Novice
6. C.B.C.S. (Le Chevaliers Bienfaisants de la Cité Sainte)
7. Chevalier-Profès/Professed Knight
8. Chevalier-Grand Profès/Grand Professed Knight

Having reformed the French branch of the order, Willermoz in 1782 succeeded in persuading the German mother branch to adopt his reforms – though not without meeting considerable opposition from other branches of the Strict Observance, such as the Bavarian Illuminati of Adam Weishaupt.

The French Revolution curtailed the activities of the CBCS in France although the rite was preserved in Switzerland. Today the CBCS, or "Scottish Rectified Rite" (Rite Ecossais Rectifié) has several "great priories" throughout the world: Switzerland, USA., France, both the Waite's & Michael Herbert's Great Priories in England, Germany, Belgium, Spain, Portugal and Brazil, with prefectures and lodges of Saint Andrew as well as Rectified Craft lodges existing in many places from Italy to Brazil to Romania.

== Papus and Chaboseau: the founding of the Martinist Order ==
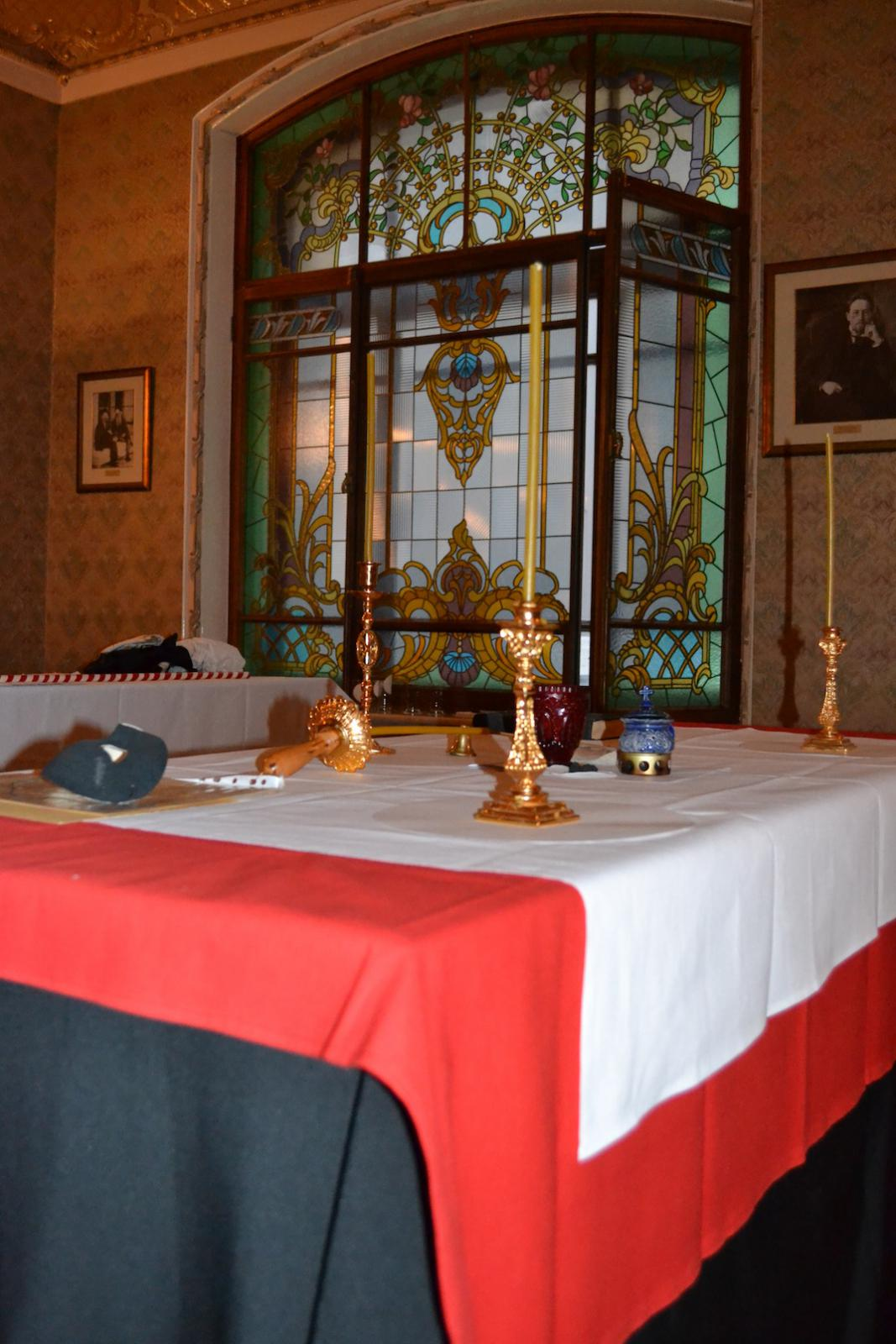
Martinist altar, photo made in course of assembly of Lodges of the Sovereign Autonomous Ancient Martinist-Martinezist Order, Hotel Metropol, Moscow, Russia, April 2013

The disciples of Saint-Martin spread the Doctrine of the Unknown Philosopher in France, Germany, Denmark and above all in Russia. It was through one of them, Henri Delaage, that in 1880 a brilliant young Parisian doctor, Gerard Encausse (Later to be known as Papus), became acquainted with the doctrines of Saint-Martin. Subsequently, in 1884, together with some of his associates, he established a Mystical Order which he called the Ordre Martiniste or the Martinist Order.

The founding of the Order came about when Encausse met Augustin Chaboseau in 1884. In parallel, Stanislas de Guaita, in association with Papus and Pierre-Augustin Chaboseau founded the Ordre Kabbalistique de la Rose Croix in 1888. Papus and Chaboseau discovered that they had both apparently received Martinist initiation through two different chains of succession which linked back to Saint-Martin and his original disciples. Papus claimed to have come into the possession of the original papers of de Pasqually and to have been given authority in the Rite of Saint-Martin by his friend Henri Viscount Delaage. However, Encausse realised that there was a "missing link" in his own chain of succession: he and Chaboseau therefore "swapped initiations" to consolidate their lineages.

The Martinist Order which Papus founded was organised as a Lodge system, which worked four degrees:

1. Associate
2. Initiate
3. Unknown Superior (S:::I:::)
4. Unknown Philosopher (S:::I:::I:::) (for starting a Heptad).

About the rituals themselves, the following general points may be made:

- The mystical Christianity of Martinism is emphasised by the fact that all lodges are opened by invoking Yeheshuah, (Hebrew: יהשוה) i.e. the Pentagrammaton, consisting of the Tetragrammaton, with the addition of the Hebrew letter Shin, which was first suggested by Reuchlin as a Qabalistic way of spelling Jesus.
- Despite the Lodge structure of Martinism, the rituals themselves do not bear any resemblance to the symbolic degrees of Freemasonry. The rituals have their own milieu of dramatic and esoteric content. It has been claimed however that some of the rituals derived from the Egyptian Freemasonry of Cagliostro, and the Scottish Rectified Rite of Willermoz.
- The rituals contain elements of Martinez de Pasqually's philosophy, and passing references to the Qabalah, in addition to principles derived from Saint-Martin's own teachings.
- The candidate at key points throughout the rituals is expected to answer on his or her own initiative. He or she is constantly encouraged to meditate on the symbolism presented.
- The rituals often rely on the element of surprise to reinforce the points they make.

During the period up to the Second World War, the I::L:: or S::I::IV degree was exceptionally added as an endorsement or rank of distinction to the S::I::I:: degree for legates in new Martinist jurisdictions who were expected to eventually become Grand Masters. Later branches of the Martinist Order worked a fifth degree, I::L:: (Free Initiator/Initiateur Libre), which conferred on the candidate the power to initiate others into all four degrees in person, not requiring Lodge or Heptad group forms, and to establish a new and independent Martinist Order, as well as to act as the legate or representative or Grand Master of that new order. For example, the Rose+Croix Martinist Order (Ontario, Canada):

1. Associate
2. Mystic
3. Unknown Superior (S::I::/Supèrieur Inconnu)
4. Unknown Superior Initiator (S::I::I::/Supèrieur Inconnu Initiateur)(Lodge/Heptad Master)
5. Free Initiator (I::L::/Initiateur Libre/S.I.IV) (Grand Officer/Grand Initiator).

== Italian Martinism ==
Italian Martinism, rooted in the teachings of de Pasqually, Jean-Baptiste Willermoz, and Louis-Claude de Saint-Martin, gained prominence in Italy through figures like Eduardo Frosini (initiated in 1905), Arturo Reghini (1878–1946), and Gabriele D’Annunzio (1863–1938), who were initiated into the Martinist Order founded by Gérard Encausse (Papus) in 1891. Following Papus' death in 1916, the Italian Martinist movement split into factions, with some aligning with Saint-Martin’s mystical path and others with Martinez de Pasqually’s theurgical approach.

The Italian Martinist scene intersected with other esoteric traditions, most notably the Egyptian Memphis Rite. Giustiniano Lebano was initiated into the Martinist Order through the Egyptian Rite around the late 19th century. Figures like Vincenzo Soro (1895–1949) and Francesco Brunelli (1927–1982) also played key roles in the Italian Martinist movement.

== Modern Martinism ==
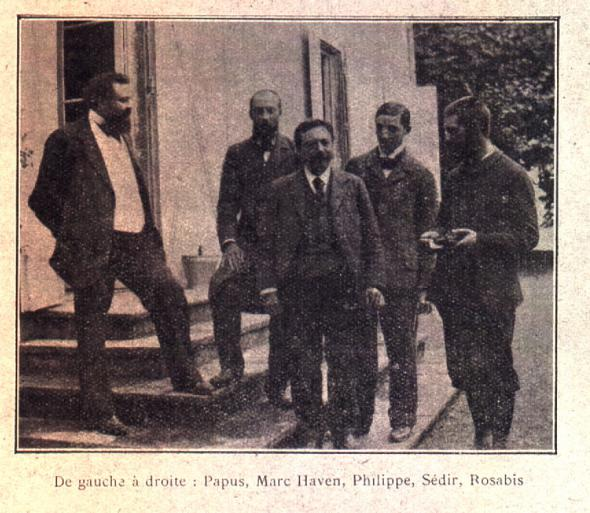
The Martinists, from left to right: Papus, Marc Haven, Philippe, Sédir, Rosabis

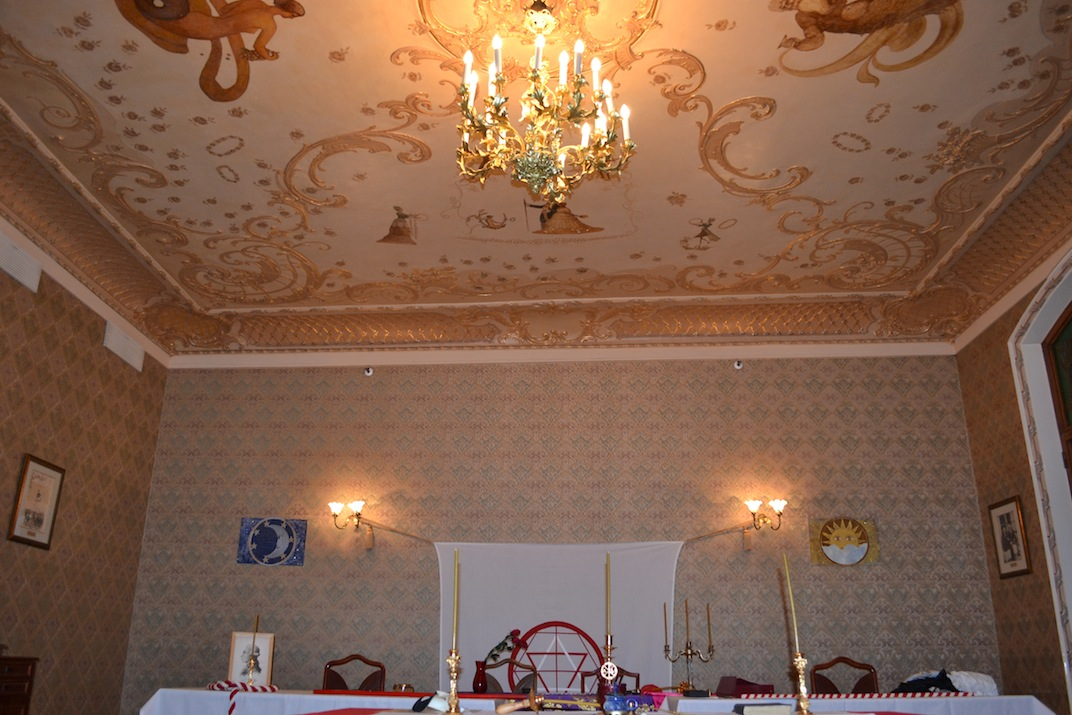
The interior of Lodges of Sovereign Autonomous Ancient Martinist-Martinezist Order during the regular ceremonial meeting at the Hotel Metropol, Moscow, Russia, in April 2013

In 1905, Tsar Nicholas II of Russia invited Papus to Tsarskoye Selo to ask for advice on domestic difficulties that he was facing with revolutionaries. The First World War was disastrous for the Order. Papus died on the battlefield fulfilling his duties as a doctor, as did many other leaders of the Order. After the war, the Order was almost extinct and the surviving members splintered into competing factions.

René Guénon was himself initiated in the Martinist Order. In between 1906 and 1912, Guénon was a member of Martinist Lodges Humanidad and Melchissedec, and published articles in L'Initiation, Revue Indépendante des Hautes Etudes Martinistes. The Congrès Spiritualiste held in Paris on 7–10 June 1908, and organized by Papus, with the presence of Victor Blanchard, Paul Veux, Paul Chacornac, Theodor Reuss, and Charles Détré alias Teder took place at the peak of the collaboration between Guénon and Papus. However, the regularity of the Martinist Order was strongly questioned by Brother O. Pontet of the Grand Orient de France. The creation by Guénon in 1909 of an Ordre du Temple within the premises of the Martinist Order, as well as his involvement in a Gnostic Church under the name Palingenius prompted the separation between Papus and Guénon.

Many French Martinists supported Karl Wilhelm Naundorff's claims to the French throne. They joined the Synarchy movement and formed the Ordre Martiniste et Synarchie (OM&S) under the leadership of Victor Blanchard. Both Imperators of The Ancient Mystical Order Rosae Crucis (AMORC), Ralph Maxwell Lewis and Harvey Spencer Lewis were initiated into the Martiniste et Synarchie (OM&S). AMORC Imperator Harvey Spencer Lewis held the title of Grand Inspector for the Americas as well as Sovereign Grand Master Legate for the United States and was granted a charter to establish Lodges in the United States. Lewis later decided not to proceed with the OM&S plan for the U.S. due to the fact that Victor Blanchard was unable to produce all the required documentation. It turned out that the activities of the OM&S were limited to the transmission of various Martinist Initiations, and that the Order otherwise had no actual existence. There was no Martinist Lodge in Paris at the time and Victor Blanchard gave his initiations in the temple of the Fraternitae des Polaires.

In 1931 Augustin Chaboseau joined Victor-Emile Michelet and Lucien Chamuel (the other two surviving members of the original Supreme Council of 1891) to resuscitate the Order that they had founded with Papus. To emphasise the difference between traditional Martinism and the many new groups that had emerged, they named their movement the Ordre Martiniste Traditionnel (OMT). Victor-Emile Michelet was elected Grand Master and Augustin Chaboseau succeeded him in 1939 until his death in 1946. AMORC Imperator Ralph Maxwell Lewis was asked by the OMT in 1939 to bring Traditional Martinism to the U.S. Lewis was thus appointed Sovereign Legate and Regional Grand Master of the OMT and received the necessary charters and other documents required in order to proceed with the Order's expansion.

The Second World War was as disastrous for the Order in Europe as the first. The Nazi regime suppressed all 'occult' groups and many Martinists died in concentration camps. The OMT in Europe and its American branch, the Traditional Martinist Order (TMO) still exist. The TMO currently operates in almost every free country in the world under the protection of AMORC. Martinism is still growing in popularity, and with the advent of the Internet, many new orders and online groups expressing an interest in Martinism have emerged worldwide.

The Martinist Order (L'Ordre Martiniste) founded by Papus in 1887 continues, and grows worldwide with Groups across Europe, Africa, the United States and the Middle East.

== See also ==
- List of general fraternities
- Outline of spirituality
