= Outline of écuyer =

Overview of the uses of écuyer and related English terms

The French term écuyer is used in English-language texts in several senses, including a designation of noble status and a term for an expert horseman or riding teacher. The English words squire, esquire and equerry belong to the same etymological family: squire and esquire derive from earlier French forms of écuyer, while equerry derives through Middle French écurie or escuyrie, words associated with squires, their duties and the care of horses. This outline surveys the historical, social and equestrian uses of écuyer and the related English terms.

== Terminology ==
The meanings depend on the period and context. The French-language overview is Écuyer; the table distinguishes the principal subjects and their related articles.

Uses of écuyer and related terms
Use or context	English term or related article	Meaning	French term and article
Medieval knight's attendant	Squire; historically also Esquire	An attendant who carried a knight's shield or equipment. The designation could also apply to a young man preparing for knighthood.	Écuyer: Écuyer (gentilhomme).
English social rank below knighthood	Esquire; also Squire	A designation within the English gentry below the rank of knight. Esquires formed a recognized social grouping in later medieval England; the designation was not confined to youths serving an apprenticeship.	Esquire (titre). For the related French designation, see Écuyer (gentilhomme).
French noble designation	Écuyer	A designation of noble status used by untitled gentlemen and ennobled people in France before the Revolution. It also appears in French colonial documents.	Écuyer: Écuyer (gentilhomme).
Country landowner	Country squire	An owner of a country estate, particularly the principal landowner in a village or district.	Gentilhomme campagnard is a descriptive equivalent.
Courtesy style	Esquire; Esq.	A style placed after a person's name, usually abbreviated Esq. It is also used as a professional courtesy style for lawyers.	Esquire: Esquire (titre).
Household office concerned with horses or personal attendance	Equerry; Grand Squire of France	Historically, an officer responsible for the horses of a royal or noble household; in the British royal household, also a personal attendant. The grand écuyer de France had charge of the king's Great Stable.	Écuyer: Écuyer (gentilhomme); Grand écuyer de France.
Other court and household functions	Royal household (related topic)	Compound titles identified particular duties: an écuyer tranchant carved meat, while an écuyer de bouche directed table service.	Écuyer tranchant, écuyer de bouche: Écuyer (gentilhomme).
Skilled rider, horse trainer or riding teacher	Écuyer; riding master or riding instructor	A skilled practitioner or teacher of horsemanship. The term is used for the riders and instructors of the Cadre Noir, whose work includes training horses and teaching equitation.	Écuyer, feminine écuyère: Écuyer (cavalier).
Equestrian performer	Écuyer; equestrian performer	A performer who executes equestrian feats before an audience, particularly in a circus.	Écuyer, feminine écuyère: Écuyer (cavalier).
