= The Devil in Love (novel) =

1772 novel by Jacques Cazotte

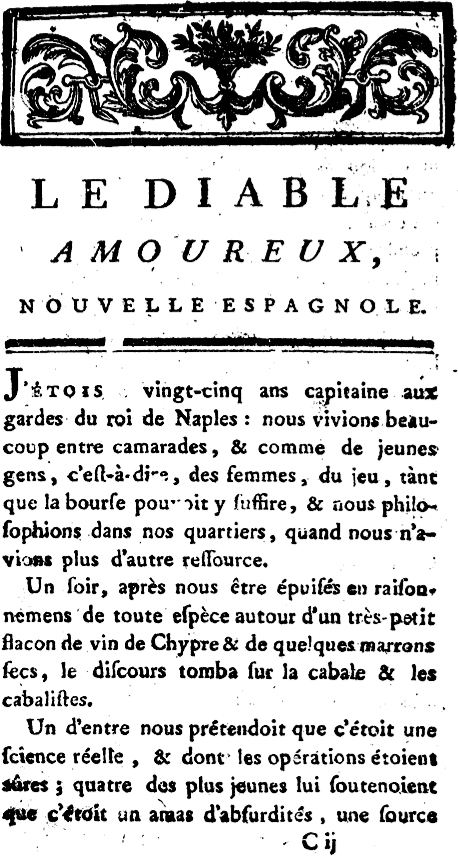
- Title page of Jacques Cazotte's The Devil in Love, 1772
- Author: Jacques Cazotte
- Original title: Le Diable amoureux
- Translator: Judith Landry
- Language: French
- Genre: novel
- Published: 1772 (French); 1793 (English)
- Publication place: France

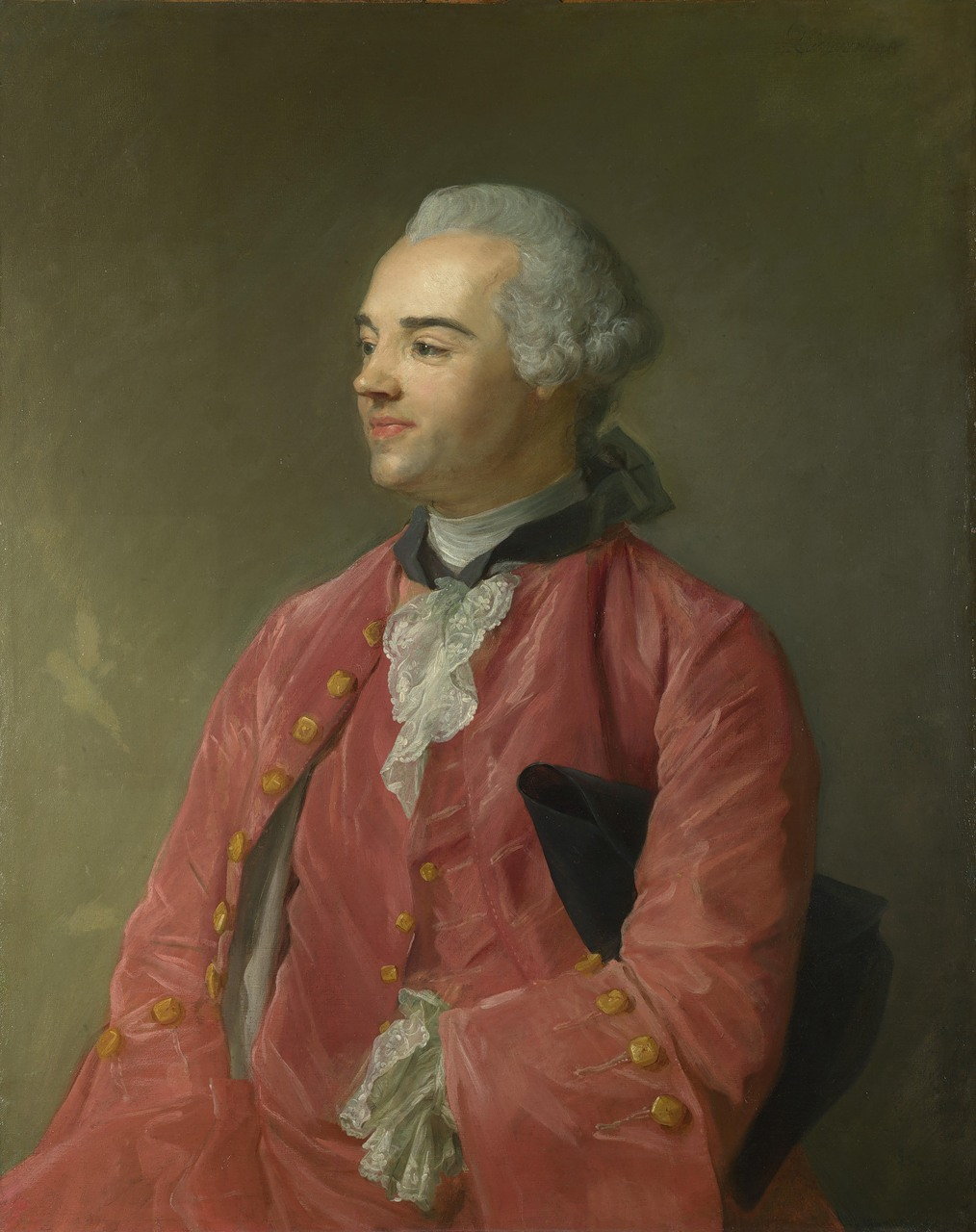
Author of The Devil in Love, Jacques Cazotte

The Devil in Love (French: Le Diable amoureux, 1772) is an paranormal romance by the French writer Jacques Cazotte which tells of a demon, or devil, who falls in love with a young Spanish nobleman named Don Alvaro, an amateur human dabbler, and attempts, in the guise of a young woman, to win his affections.

French critic P.G. Castex has described The Devil In Love as "the very initiator of the modern fantasy story".

Canadian critic Carlo Testa has described The Devil In Love (in review of Stephen Sartarelli's 1993 translation) as a "terminus a quo" in the history of the demonic subgenre".

The Le Diable amoureux started a literary style known as fantastique, where surreal events intrude on reality and the reader is left guessing whether the events actually occurred or were merely the product of the character's imagination.

== Plot ==
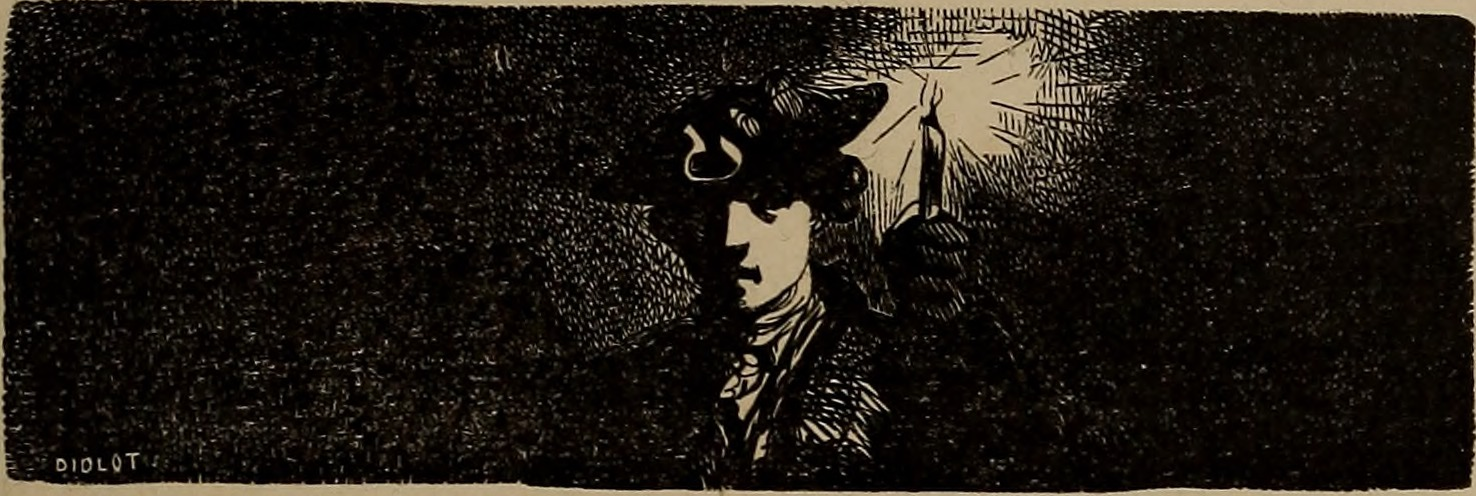
Image of young but wise man of "Le diable amoureux, roman fantastique" (1845)

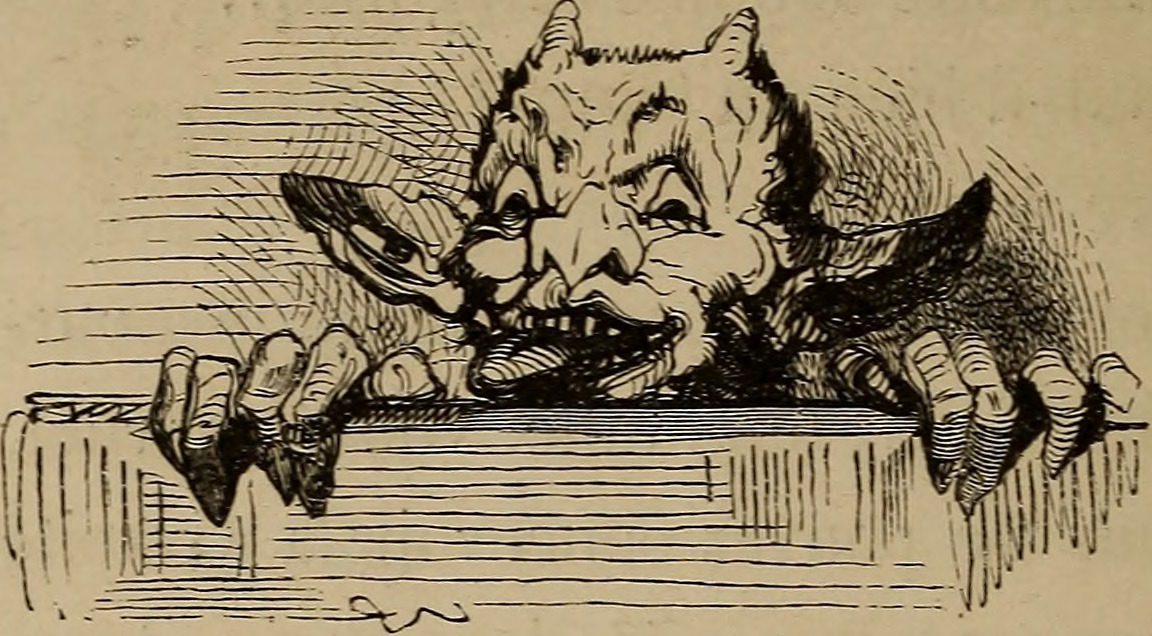
Image of demon in "Le diable amoureux, roman fantastique" (1845)

Don Alvaro, a young but wise man, invokes Satan. Upon seeing the young Alvaro, Satan falls in love with him and assumes the appearance of a young woman, Biondetta. He follows Alvaro as his page. In the journey that unfolds, Satan, disguised as a woman, tries to seduce Alvaro who rejects his advances lest he lose his virginity. He is unwilling to compromise his honor by sleeping with a woman before they are married and he will first need his mother’s approval of the union.

Over the course of their journey, Biondetta (the devil's name as a woman) and Alvaro will grow closer and closer. When the protagonist's friend Olympia discovers that Alvaro's "male" servant is in fact of the female sex, she confronts Alvaro, who denies the accusations and sides with his servant. Thereafter, Biondetta abandons her life as servant and proceeds to get closer and closer to Alvaro, surviving an assassination attempt by Olympia. The devil tries to have sex with Alvaro, before their wedding or Alvaro's mother's blessings, but is rebuffed by Alvaro. Biondetta then takes leave, never to be found again. Alvaro returns to his family's court, where his mother consoles him that it was all a bad dream. His mother reminds him that if he had listened to her he would never have fallen victim to the devil.

== Reception ==
The novel would prove influential on Jacques Lacan who encountered it as part of a symposium on Jacques Cazotte. Lacan would adapt one scene from the story, in which the devil first appears and asks Alvaro "che vuoi?" (What do you want? in Italian). Lacan incorporated this into the graph of desire, arguing that one must ask oneself over and over again what the big Other "truly wants".

== Adaptations ==
- 1840: Le Diable amoureux, France, a ballet by Napoléon Henri Reber, François Benoist and balletmaster Joseph Mazilier. It was later restaged in a revised version under the title Satanella by the Marius Petipa with his father Jean Petipa for the Imperial Ballet with the original music re-orchestrated by Konstantin Liadov. This revival premiered on February 10, 1848 at the Bolshoi Kamenny Theatre in St. Petersburg, Russia.
- 1858: "Satanella, or The Power of Love", Romantic Opera in Four Acts by Michael William Balfe.
- 1929: Le Diable amoureux, France, a comic opera by Alexis Roland-Manuel.
- 1975–1989: Devil in Love (Vlyublyonny dyavol), Russia, an opera in two acts by Alexander Vustin, libretto by Vladimir Khachaturov.
- 1993: The Club Dumas (El Club Dumas), Spain, a novel by Arturo Pérez-Reverte which was inspired by, and refers to, the novel.
- 1999: The Ninth Gate, United States, a film directed by Roman Polanski, starring Johnny Depp, is a partial adaptation of The Club Dumas.
- 2010: "The Devil in Love - A Soundtrack to the 1772 Occult Novel", a double-CD compilation with contributions from The Tiger Lillies, Jarboe, John Zorn, Art Zoyd and other artists; issued with a Swedish translation of the novel published by Malört Förlag.
