= Igor Dronov =

Russian conductor

Igor Arturovich Dronov
- Игорь Артурович Дронов
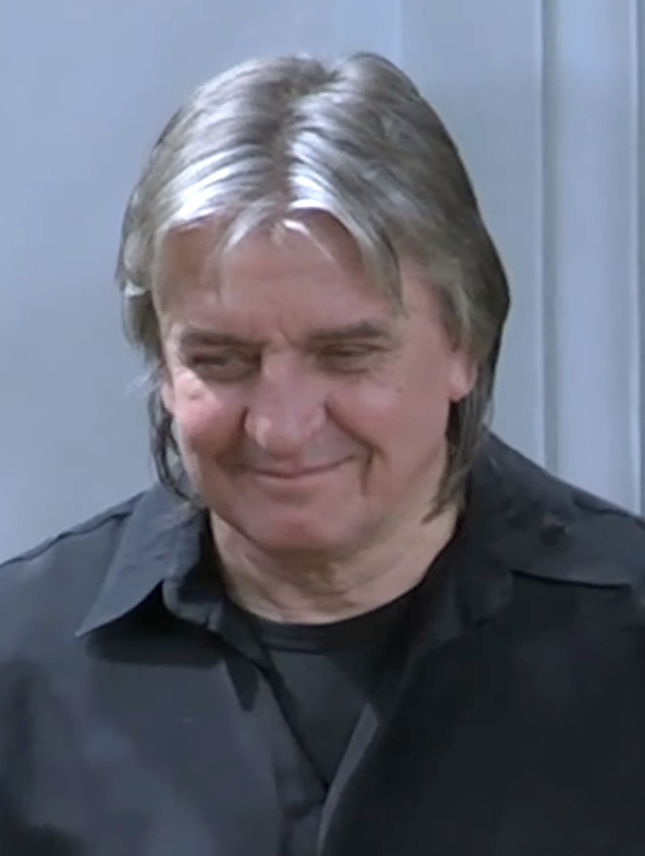
- Igor Dronov in 2020
- Born: July 25, 1963 (age 62); Moscow
- Occupation: Conductor

Igor Arturovich Dronov (Russian: Игорь Артурович Дронов; born 25 July 1963) is a Moscow-born Russian conductor and Honoured Artist of Russia who graduated from the Moscow Conservatory where he studied under Boris Tevlin and Dmitry Kitaenko. From 1991 to 1996 he worked as a conductor at the Bolshoi Theatre, where he conducted music for such productions as Aleko, Faust, both The Fallen Woman and Giuseppe Verdi's Il Trovatore, Miserly Knight and Eugene Onegin. In 1992 he became professor of conducting at the same place he graduated from and is still works there. Currently he works as principal conductor at the Studio for New Music where he records his CDs. He is also a guest conductor at the Russian National Orchestra and is a conductor of both Premiere and Russian Philharmonia. Besides national appearances he also appeared overseas in such countries as Austria, Belgium, Czech Republic, Finland, France, Germany, Italy, the Netherlands, Romania, Switzerland, Spain, Taiwan, in Vatican City and the United States.
