= Jean-Baptiste Willermoz =

18th-century French freemason

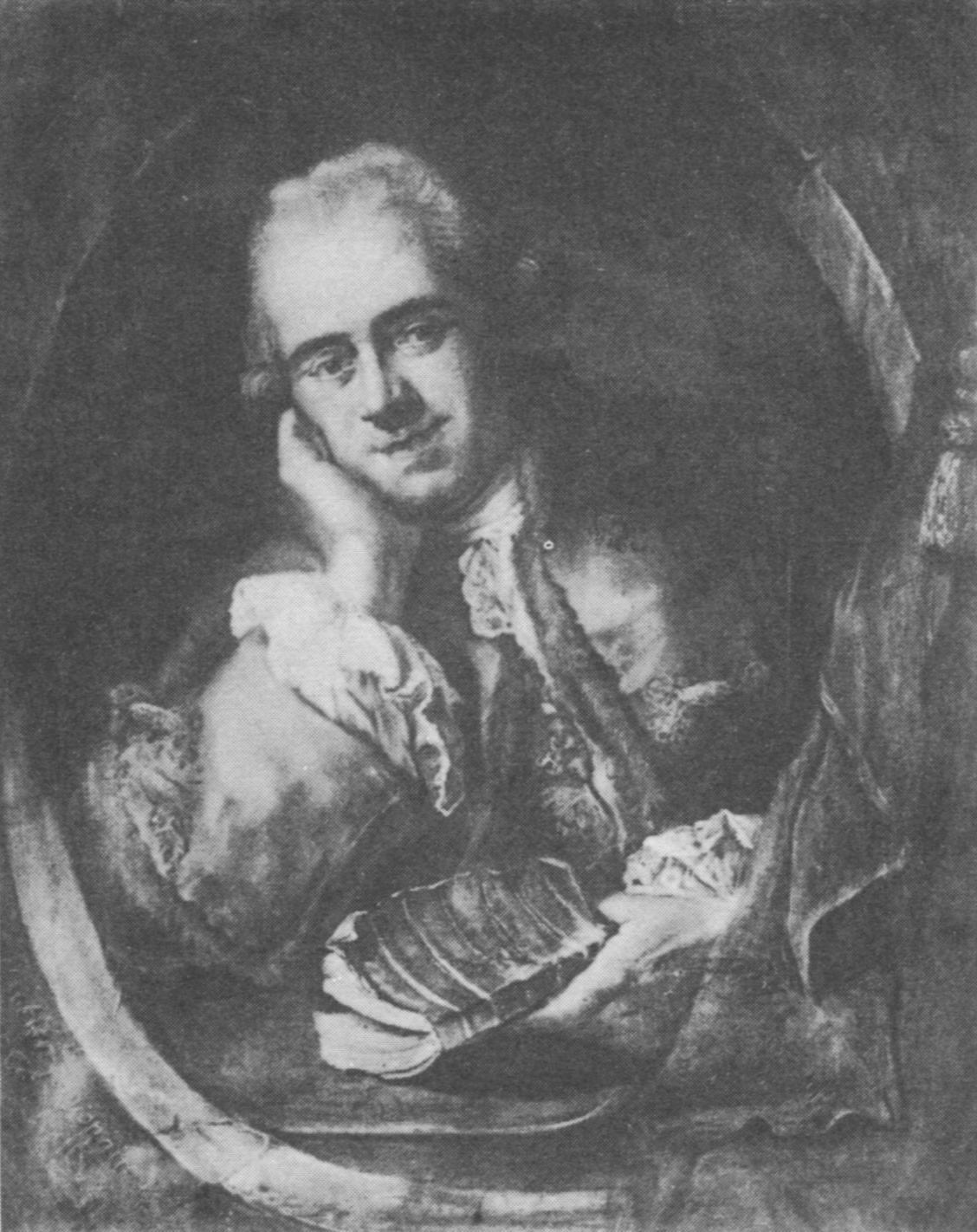
- Portrait of Willermoz by Jacques Gauthier d'Apoty in 1766
- Born: 10 July 1730; Lyon, Auvergne-Rhône-Alpes, France
- Died: 29 May 1824 (aged 93); Lyon, Auvergne-Rhône-Alpes, France
- Resting place: Loyasse Cemetery, Lyon, France; 45.76310°N 4.81142°E
- Organization: Freemasonry
- Office: General of the Department of the Rhône
- Term: 1 June 1800 – 1815
- Movement: Martinism
- Spouse: Jeanne-Marie Pascal (married 1799)
- Children: 2
- Father: Claude Catherin Willermoz

Jean-Baptiste Willermoz (10 July 1730 – 29 May 1824) was a French Freemason and Martinist who played an important role in the establishment of various systems of Masonic high-degrees in his time in both France and Germany.

== Biography ==
Jean-Baptiste Willermoz was born on 10 July 1730 in Lyon. He was the oldest of 12 children. He lived mainly in Lyon. He was the brother of Pierre-Jacques Willermoz, a physician and chemist who also worked on the Encyclopédie of Diderot and D'Alembert.

He was a manufacturer in silk and silver at Rue des Quatre-Chapeaux, and as a volunteer director of charities, he played an important role in the European freemasonry of his time. As such he was initiated at the age of 20 and became Venerable Master of his lodge at 23.

As a mystic, passionate about the secret nature of initiation, he contributed to the creation of the Regular Grand Lodge of Masters in Lyon and became its Grand Master in 1761. The Grand Lodge practised the seven Masonic high-degrees of the time, and added an eighth named "Scottish Grand Master, Knights of the Sword and the Rose-Croix." Willermoz founded in this setting, in 1763, together with his brother Pierre-Jacques, a lodge entitled "Sovereign Chapter of Knights of the Black Eagle Rose-Cross" which was devoted to alchemical research.

He was admitted to first grade in the Order of the Elus Cohens at Versailles in 1767 personally by Martinez de Pasqually on the recommendation of Jean-Jacques Bacon de la Chevalerie (1731-1821) and the Marquis de Lusignan (1749-1814). In May 1768 he was admitted to the Réaux-Croix. In 1772 he corresponded with the Strasbourg lodge of the Strict Observance. After the death of Martinez de Pasqually on September 20, 1774, he engaged with his friend and Cohen-brother Louis-Claude de Saint-Martin to write a comprehensive review of the doctrine of the Elus Cohens, in the form of lessons, called "the Lessons of Lyon" to be held from 7 January 1774 to 23 October 1776. He said in a letter of 1780 to the Prince of Hesse that he was given the rank of Réau-Croix in the Order of Martinez Pasqually.

In the 1770s, he came into contact with Baron von Hund and the German Order of the Order of Strict Observance which he joined in 1773 with the chivalric name Eques ab Eremo and Chancellor of the Chapter of Lyons. In 1774 he set up Strict Observance's Lyon lodge, La Bienfaisance, and became chancellor of its new province, the directory of Auvergne. It was under his leadership that the "Convent of Gaul, Lyon was held in 1778 that recognized the degrees of Profès and Grands Profès and constituted the 'Beneficent Knights of the Holy City (CBCS). Willermoz introduced also at the Convention of Lyon the Régime Ecossais Rectifié (Rectified Scottish Rite), which combined Templar Freemasonry with the religious ceremonial of the Elect Coëns.

In 1782, Willermoz wrote that there are three kinds of alchemical freemasons:

- Those who think that the purpose of Masonry is to make the Philosopher's Stone.
- Those who search for the Panacea.
- Those who search for the Science of Great Work by which man would find the wisdom and practices of early Christianity (to which he himself subscribed)

Owing to disagreements within the Rite of Strict Observance, Willermoz organized in July 1782 the convent of Wilhelmsbad where 33 delegates attended in Europe and saw to the creation of the Rectified Scottish Rite There he defended the place of Martinist currents in the rite, through the delegacy of Joseph de Maistre who sent his famous Memorandum to the Duke of Brunswick. This was not supported by the other delegates.

Very reserved towards Cagliostro, he thought, after several conversations with him, that he did not promote an "orthodox" Christianity in his eyes. He therefore urged members of the Knights Beneficent not to give any credence to him, nor to the lodge he founded in 1785 in Paris, the first mother-lodge of the Egyptian rite, whose name was "the Wisdom Triumphant".

Worried about the eventual outbreak of the Revolution, he hid in Ain, in a house belonging to his brother Pierre-Jacques, taking with him his extensive Masonic archive.

He was later appointed General of the Department of the Rhone by the Prime Consul on 1 June 1800, an office he held for 15 years. He resumed his Masonic activities with a resurgence of the CBCS in 1804, and dedicated himself to this end until his death (in Lyon) at age 93 on 29 May 1824.

== See also ==
- Freemasonry
- Martinism
