= Order of Knight-Masons Elect Priests of the Universe =

French magical organisation

- Ordre des Chevaliers Maçons Élus Coëns de l’Univers
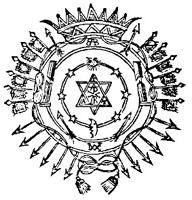
- Élus Coëns seal of Pasqually
- Formation: 1767
- Type: Esoteric Christian fraternal organization
- Location: France
- Leader: Martinez de Pasqually (1767-1772)

The Order of Knight-Masons Elect Priests of the Universe (French: Ordre des Chevaliers Maçons Élus Coëns de l’Univers) or simply Élus Coëns (sometimes misspelled ‘Elus Cohens’ or ‘Kohens’, Hebrew for ‘Elect Priests’), was a theurgical organisation founded by Martinez de Pasqually. It appeared in France in the second half of the 18th century and is the first branch of Martinist tradition, otherwise known as Martinezism.

== Doctrine ==
Martinez de Pasqually’s Traité de la Réintégration des êtres (Treatise on the Reintegration of Beings).

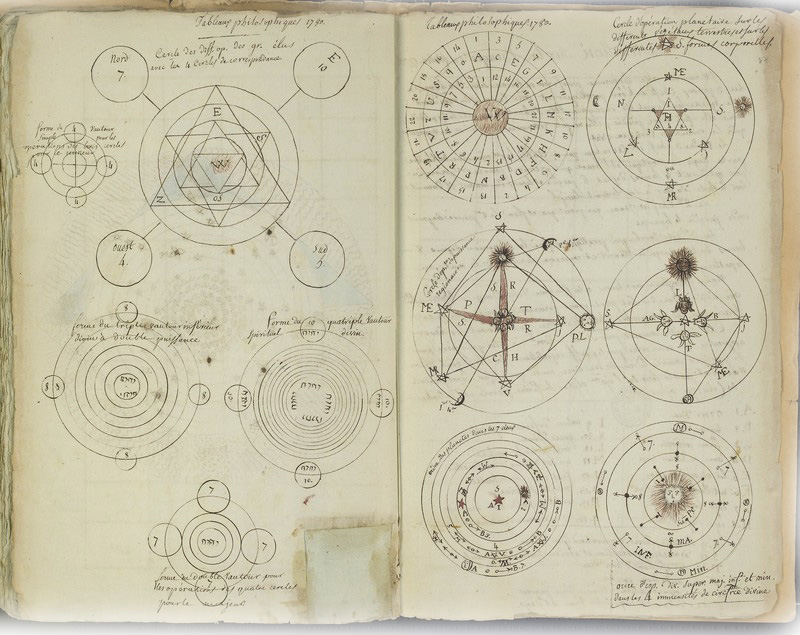
Léonard Joseph Prunelle de Lière’s Élus Coëns notebook with the seals of spirits of both good angels and evil demons.

=== General teaching ===
The Élus Coëns is an esoteric Christian order founded in 1767, with its focus on establishing an invisible church, independent of any earthly structure, to find the path that leads to the hidden knowledge of nature in anticipation of the coming destruction of the material Church. That is to say, by a progressive initiation and a direct knowledge of God to obtain the primordial unity, which was lost since the fall of Adam—the Reintegration—through the practice of theurgy, which relied on complex ceremonial practices aimed at what Pasqually termed the reconciliation of the ‘minor’ person with Divinity. This was to be accomplished through human communication with the angelic hierarchies. In other words, they practised theurgy which consisted of evoking the intermediary spirits, such as angels and celestial beings in order to obtain their help and support. With this in mind, the Masonic system provides an adequate structure for this course taken using occultist methods.

The teachings address essentially major themes relating to the Judeo-Christian tradition, but from an esoteric point of view, under the Cabbalistic, Hermetic, and Gnostic influences—some have claimed strong elements of Valentinian Gnostic teachings, but this is actually not as reliable as the Manichean / Mandaean elements very present in these writings and catechisms—found in Pasqually’s own texts, rituals and catechisms. They drew upon the power of Church prayers, banished the influence of Satan from humanity.

=== The Architect ===
Hiram Abiff—the allegorical figure of Freemasonry—is also presented in the Martinezist tradition, but with a different view. According to an archive from Lyon Library, the Private Instructions to the Coëns of Lyon, Hiram was not murdered but simply retired from his job because King Solomon fell into sinful ways. He could not die because he was not an ordinary mortal but a sublime essence, a bearer of holiness, an architect sent to Solomon by the Great Architect of the Universe. It is also described in the archive that he is one of the six great elects, among whom are Hely, Enoch, Melchizedek, Ur and Elijah. All of them precede the seventh and final elect – the Corrector or Mender, our Lord Jesus Christ. But it was Hiram, being the chief architect of the Temple of King Solomon, who foreshadowed by his appearance, the coming of the Son of God (Jesua Messiah), as the Great Architect of the New Testament Church.

This view of Martinezism developed in higher degrees is completely distinct from ordinary Freemasonry’s: departed from Masonic symbolism and ordinary Masonic works, the Coëns introduced a mystical philosophy, a detailed description of which can be found in Pasqually’s Treatise on the Reintegration of Beings into Their Original Estate, Virtues and Powers both Spiritual and Divine (Traité de la Réintégration des êtres dans leurs premières propriétés, vertus et puissance spirituelles et divines).

== Structure ==
This doctrine, he intended for an elite chosen from the ranks of his contemporary masons, and gathered under the banner of the 'Elus Coens' (Elect Priests). Quickly this order gained quite the reputation in French masonic circles, but the theurgic operations remained reserved for the higher degrees. Martinez did not, to a greater extent, graft his system solely on freemasonry. Until 1761, it is to be located in Montpellier, Paris, Lyon, Bordeaux, Marseille, and Avignon.

In 1761 he built a special temple in Avignon, where he resided himself until 1766. At that time, the Order of the Elect Coens is worked as a high-degree system superimposed on the Blue Lodges: The first class has three symbolic degrees, and that of 'maître parfait élu', then the grades Coens proper: apprentice Coën, fellowcraft Coën, and master Coën, Grand Master Coën or Grand Architect, Chevalier d'Orient or Knight Zorobabel, Commandeur d'Orient or Commander Zorobabel, and finally the last degree, the supreme consecration of Reaux Croix.

== Origin myth and history ==
The history of the Élus Coëns, like the history of any secret society, is quite complex and confusing. The history has been preserved in very few written documents that could shed light on the order that remains almost unknown for more than two centuries. However, its history can be divided into a legendary one and an actual one.

=== Legendary history ===
The legendary history, according to Pasqually’s Treatise on the Reintegration of Beings, the fundamental book of Élus Coëns, the teachings taught in the order derive from the teachings that Seth, the third son of Adam, received from the Angels, which including certain rituals and reconciliation of humanity with God. But the descendants of Seth perverted this knowledge, thus it became useless, until it was retransmitted by Noah. Since then, it has passed through the ages, through a continuous chain of the tradition of initiation to the Rosicrucians. The higher mystery of the Rosicrucian brotherhood was taught at the highest level of the Order of the Elect Priests, which had the designation ‘R+’ that means ‘Reaux-Croix’ (‘Pink Cross’ or ‘Ruddy Cross’).

It is believed that the doctrine transmitted in the Order of the Elect Priests, especially the teaching of ‘R+’ level, was the axis and the basic doctrine of all the preceding esoteric brotherhoods, societies and orders that existed before the emergence of the Elect Priests. Moreover, according to the Treatise, all the Old Testament prophets, for example, Moses, Elijah, Isaiah, Ezekiel, Daniel, Solomon and his architect Hiram Abiff, among others; as well as many New Testament figures and mystics, among them the Twelve Apostles of Jesus Christ and theologians and teachers of the early Christian Church; also various legendary figures, such as Christian Rosenkreuz, were all the Elect Priests of the universe.

=== Documented history ===
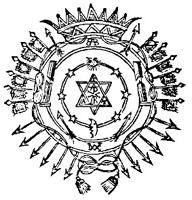
The Cohen Seal of Pasqually

For twenty years, spanning from 1754 to 1774, the year of his death, Pasqually worked ceaselessly to establish and promote his Ordre des Chevaliers Maçons Élus Coëns de l'Univers. In 1754 he founded the Chapter of Scottish Judges in Montpellier. In 1761, he became affiliated with the lodge La Française in Bordeaux and founded a Cohen Temple there. In 1764 La Française was reorganized by him as Française Élue Écossaise to indicate that it now had a Chapter of superior degrees.

In 1766 the directors of the Masonic province of Bordeaux declared that they were abolishing all constitutions relating to higher grades apart from the first three (Regular Blue- or St. John's degrees of: Apprentice, Fellowcraft and Master). As a result, all the works of the Chapter were suspended. This same year Martinez travelled to Paris and found a new and explicit Elus Cohen-temple together with Bacon de Chivalerie, Jean-Baptiste Willermoz, Fauger d'Ignéacourt, the Count of Lusignan, Henri de Loos, Grainville, and several others that were to play important parts in the history the Order.

In 1767, he established the Sovereign Tribunal who would direct the whole Order of the Elus Coens. In 1768 he met with Louis-Claude de Saint-Martin. The personality and teachings of Pasqually made a deep and lasting impression on Saint-Martin. Conversely, Pasqually himself was influenced by Saint-Martin who decided to leave his military career in 1771 and become the personal secretary of Martinez, replacing Abbe Pierre Fournié.

From this period the notable development of the rituals of the order starts and Pasquallys drafting of his magnum opus, the Treatise on the Reintegration of Beings, the main doctrinal foundation of the Martinist theosophy and theurgy. In 1772 Pasqually, embarked on a trip to Santo Domingo to receive an inheritance, and subsequently died there in 1774. Thereafter, the Order disintegrates.

=== Collapse ===
In 1776, the Coens Temples of La Rochelle, Marseille, and Libourne fall into the grasp of the Grand Lodge of France. In 1777, the rites are no longer in operation and institutional use, except from some circles in Paris, Versailles and Eu.

Finally, in 1781, Sebastien Las Casas, third and last 'Grand Sovereign' of the Elus Cohens (successor of Caignet de Lester, who died in 1778) ordered the closure of the eight remaining temples that still recognize his authority. Despite the official closure, the Elus Coens continued to both practice theurgy, and to conduct initiations. On the other hand, the theosophical teaching of Martinez was not lost, in masonry, it spreads even long after the death of the leader through the Masonic system established by Willermoz shortly after death his master.

Besides Willermoz and Saint-Martin, the last known personal disciple of Martinez was Abbe Pierre Fournié. It was around 1768 that he met the teacher who would make him turn around his life completely, and of whom would be employed as secretary. Initiated as an Elus Coën, the tonsured cleric Fournié resides mainly in Bordeaux, where he mediates the correspondences between different members of the Order.

In 1776, Louis-Claude de Saint-Martin is quoted as describing him as an Elus Cohen exceptionally favoured in supernatural manifestations; the source is Fournié himself in his own work What we've been, what we are and what we become (1802), in fear of saying too much. At the time of the revolution Fournié emigrated to England, where he remained until his death, and in this period, from 1818 to 1821, he befriends the Theosophist of Munich Franz von Baader.

=== Aftermath ===
Two of Pasqually's disciples particularly distinguished themselves: Jean-Baptiste Willermoz and Louis Claude de Saint-Martin.

Jean-Baptiste Willermoz was an ardent adept of Freemasonry and theurgy. For him, the doctrine of Reintegration is at the base of primitive and authentic masonry that is to be found by the meeting on this basis of all ‘rites and systems’. He joined the German Order of Strict Templar Observance in 1773, the order was reformed by Willermoz under a new name, the Order of Knights Beneficent of the Holy City, which combined Templar Freemasonry with the ceremonial of the Élus Coëns.

Meanwhile, Louis Claude de Saint-Martin had renounced Freemasonry and the theurgy used by Élus Coëns. By judging these methods of angelic evocation to be unreliable and even dangerous, he chose to take another path, what he called ‘The Way of the Heart’ to attain the Reintegration, the inward contemplation that opposes the exterior theurgic ritual.

At the end of the 19th century, various occultist currents reclaimed Martinez de Pasqually—among them, the Ordre de la Rose-Croix catholique du Temple et du Graal—founded in 1890 by Joséphin Péladan, which claimed to fight against the ‘Latin Decadence’ by the return to the religion of the ‘Art God’ and an imperial theocracy.

The only two books written by Martinez de Pasqually, the Manuscrit d'Alger and the Traité sur la réintégration des êtres have been translated in English and both published in 2021. "The Algiers Manuscript", under the title "The Green Book of the Élus Coëns", published by Lewis Masonic; and the Treatise on the Reintegration of Beings, published by the Traditional Martinist Order.

== Reawakening and final closure ==
In 1943, Robert Ambelain, whose mystical name was Aurifer, revived the Order of the Élus Coëns. The other two esotericists who signed the Charter to revive the Order were Robert Amadou (1924 – 2006) and Roger Ménard. Georges Bogé de Lagrèze (1882-1946) was elected Grand Master and Ambelain his Deputy Grand Master.

The degrees of this new Order were the Operative degrees of the original Élus Coëns, reconstituted with the scarce material Ambelain had in his hands. The name of the Order was later changed in “Ordre Martiniste des Élus Cohens”, where candidates were also initiated into the usual three degrees of Martinism; this was the ‘outer order’ which formed the ante-chamber of the Operative degrees.

Ambelain, who always looked for possibilities to expand the Order, introduced elements that had nothing to do with the original Coëns: Neo-Gnosticism, Qabalah and Memphis-Misraim among others. This happened because he did not have enough material to actually do all the degrees, and found in other traditions a good solution to fill the gaps. This was quite easy for him because he was the leader of several initiatic organisations, which were closely linked with each other: The Martinist Order, the Rite of Memphis-Misraim, the Élus Coëns, the Kabbalistic Order of the Rose+Cross, the Ecclesia Gnostica Apostolica and the Gnostic Catholic Apostolic Church.

Ambelain entrusted its leadership to Ivan Mosca (1915 – 2005) – mystical name Hermete – who made the Order dormant in 1968 and then reawakened it in 1995. Upon the death of Mosca, who did not designate successors, two groups claimed the legitimate succession, a Spanish and an Italian-French one. A third group also reconstructed its ‘regularity’ within the Order of the United Rites of Memphis Misraim, through an Ambelain-Kloppel-Castelli lineage, and proceeded with a philological reconstruction of the original rituals and operations.

The order was officially closed, as publicly announced in the Martinist magazine L'Initiation, in 1964.

== See also ==
- Magical organization
