= Lecuyer =

Lecuyer or L'Écuyer is a surname. Notable people with the surname include:

- Charlotte L'Écuyer (1943–2021), Canadian politician
- Claude L'Écuyer (born 1947), Canadian politician
- Doug Lecuyer (born 1958), Canadian retired ice hockey player
- Gerald L'Ecuyer (born 1959), Canadian film and television director
- Gerard Lecuyer (born 1936), Canadian politician from Manitoba
- Jacques Lécuyer (1912–1999), French general and resistance leader
- Jean Lécuyer, French track and field athlete
- John L'Écuyer (born 1966), Canadian film and television director
- Matthieu Lecuyer (born 1980), French sports car racer
