= Olga Sedakova (poet) =

Russian poet and translator

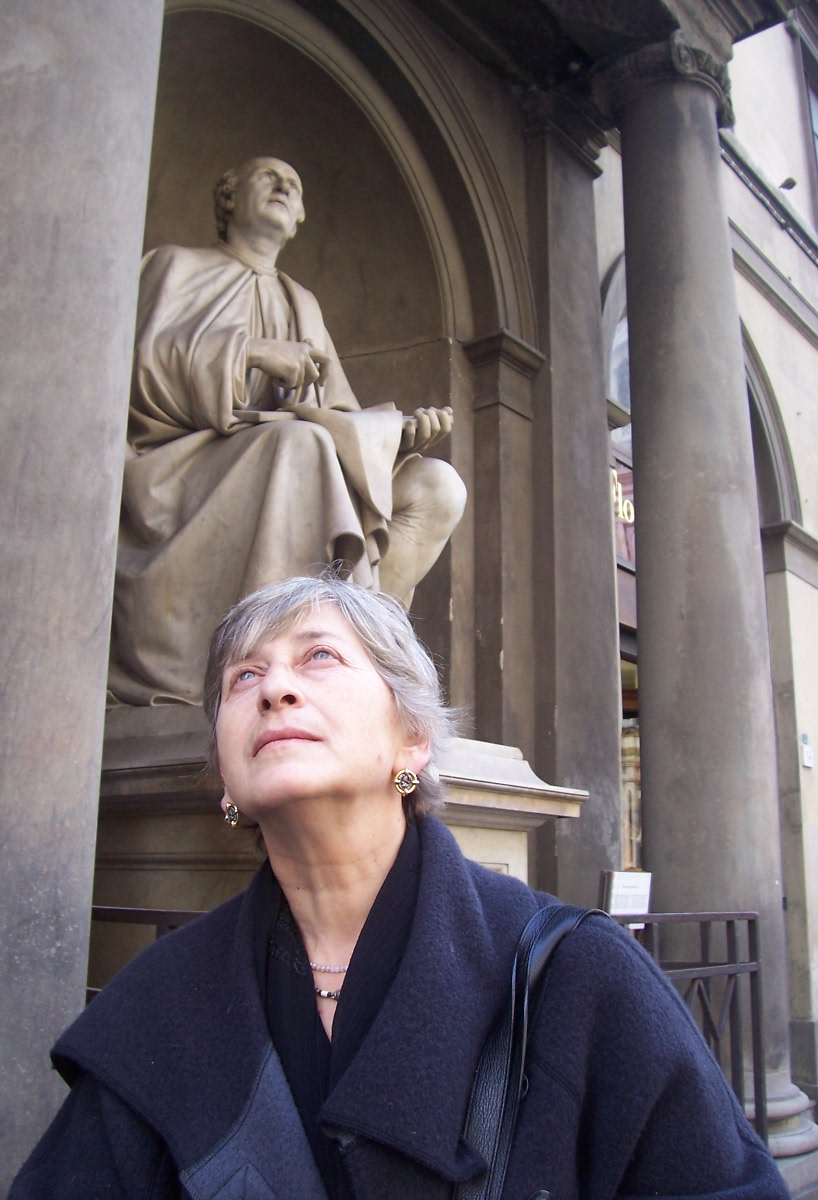
Olga Sedakova in Florence, 2006

Olga Alexandrovna Sedakova (Russian: Ольга Александровна Седакова; 26 December 1949 in Moscow) is a Russian poet and translator. She has been described as "one of the best confessional Christian poets writing in Russian today". Sedakova is also recognized as a philosopher and humanist.

Sedakova was born in Moscow to the family of a military engineer. At an early age, she traveled with her father overseas, enabling her to gain a different view of the world. She graduated from Moscow State University (faculty of philology) in 1973. Subsequently, she went to graduate school. In 1985, she obtained a degree of Candidate of Sciences (philology). She befriended Venedikt Yerofeyev and kept the manuscript of Moscow-Petushki in her house.

A deeply religious person, Sedakova started writing poetry in 1960. Her Christian themes made her Neoclassical works unpublishable in the Soviet Union until 1989. As of 2014, she has authored seven books of poetry. Her poems were translated into a number of languages including English, French, German, and Italian.

It was through her mentor Sergey Averintsev that Sedakova became involved in the ecumenist movement. She is known to have exchanged poetry collections with John Paul II who presented the inaugural Vladimir Solovyov Prize to her (1998). She also criticised the Russian Orthodox Church for taking an intolerant stance on other forms of Christian faith.

Sedakova is the recipient of several major literary prizes, including the Andrei Bely Prize (1980), Paris Prize for Russian Poets (1991), European Prize in Poetry (1995), Vladimir Solovyov Prize for Advancement of Culture (1998), and Solzhenitsyn Prize (2001).
