= Louis Claude de Saint-Martin =

French philosopher (1743–1803)

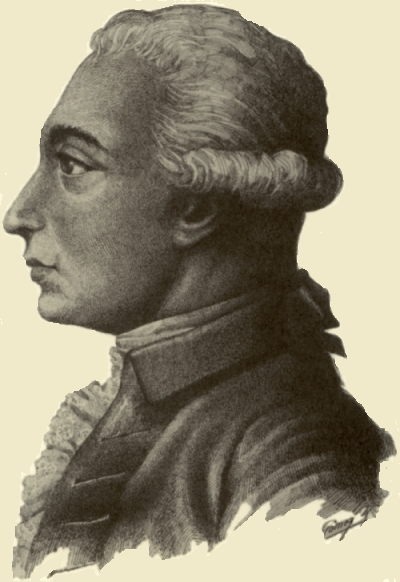
- Born: 18 January 1743; Amboise, France
- Died: 14 October 1803 (aged 60); Aulnay, France
- Occupation: Philosopher

Louis Claude de Saint‑Martin (18 January 1743 – 14 October 1803) was a French freemason and philosopher, known as le philosophe inconnu ('the unknown philosopher'), the name under which his works were published. He was an influential Christian mystic whose legacy, together with that of his mentor Martinez de Pasqually, inspired the founding of the Martinist Order. Initiated under the name 'Eques a Leone Sidero', he was a member of the Societé des Initiés, an inner order of mystical freemasons directed by Jean-Baptiste Willermoz, in which they allegedly received revelations from an 'Unknown Agent' (Agent Inconnu).

Léonce de Saint-Martin, composer and organist, was a distant relative of Louis‑Claude de Saint‑Martin.

== Life ==
He was born in Amboise into a family of the lesser nobility of central France.

At his father's wish, he first tried law, and then the army, as a profession. While in the garrison at Bordeaux, he came under the influence of Martinez de Pasqually, usually described as a Portuguese Jew (although later research has revealed the probability that he was a Spanish Catholic), who taught a form of mysticism drawn from cabbalistic sources and endeavoured to found a secret cult with magical or theurgical rites. Around September 1768, Saint‑Martin was introduced to the Elect Coëns. From 1768 until 1771, he worked at Bordeaux as secretary to Martinez de Pasqually.

In 1771, Saint-Martin left the army to become a preacher of mysticism. In the same year, he was living with Jean-Baptiste Willermoz at Lyon, while writing his first book. His conversational powers made him welcome in Parisian salons; but his zeal led him to England, where he made the acquaintance of William Law, the English mystic, and to Italy and Switzerland, as well as to the chief towns of France. In February 1784, Saint-Martin joined Society of Harmony in Paris. In 1787, he met the works of William Law on a trip to London. From 1788 until 1791 he resided at Strasbourg, where he met Baron Karl Göran Silfverhjelm, the nephew of Emanuel Swedenborg. At Strasbourg, in 1788, he met Charlotte de Boecklin, who introduced him to the writings of Jakob Böhme. In July 1790, he resigned from Rectified Scottish Rite and asked Jean-Baptiste Willermoz for his name to be removed from all Masonic registers. In 1792, Saint-Martin began corresponding with the Swiss theosopher Niklaus Anton Kirchberger von Liebisdorf.

A nobleman, he was interned and his property was confiscated during the French Revolution. He was later freed by local officials, who wanted him to become a school teacher. He was brought up a strict Catholic and always remained attached to the Church, although his first work, Of Errors and Truth, was placed upon the Index. He died at Aulnay (now Châtenay-Malabry), on the night of 13–14 October 1803.

== Works ==
He was the first to translate the writings of Jakob Böhme from German into French. His later years were devoted almost entirely to the composition of his chief works and to the translation of Böhme. His published letters show that he was interested in spiritualism, magnetic treatments, magical evocation, and the works of Emanuel Swedenborg.

His chief works are Lettre à un ami, ou Considérations philosophiques et religieuses sur la révolution française (Letter to a Friend, or Philosophical and Religious Considerations on the French Revolution), Éclair sur l'Association humaine, L'Esprit des choses ou Coup d'œil philosophique sur la nature des êtres et sur l'objet de leur existence, and Le Ministère de l'Homme-Esprit. Other treatises appeared in his Œuvres posthumes (1807).

Saint‑Martin regarded the French Revolution as a sermon in action, if not indeed a miniature of the last judgment. His ideal society was a natural and spiritual theocracy, in which God would raise up men of mark and endowment, who would regard themselves strictly as divine commissioners to guide the people. All ecclesiastical organisation was to disappear, giving place to a purely spiritual Christianity.

Saint‑Martin taught that humanity possesses a faculty superior to the rational sense of morality, and that it is by this faculty that we receive knowledge of God. God exists as an eternal personality, created by an overflowing of divine love, which was unable to contain itself. The four stages of divine emanation are the human soul, the human intellect or spirit, the spirit of the universe, and the elements, or matter. Thus humanity is the immediate reflection of God, and nature in turn a reflection of man. Man, however, has fallen from his high estate, and matter is one of the consequences of his fall. But divine love, united to humanity in Christ, will achieve the final regeneration.

== Influence ==
Admirers of his works formed groups of 'Friends of St. Martin', which later became known as Martinists.

Saint‑Martin was also read by Joseph de Maistre, Franz von Baader, Nicolas Berdiaeff, Karl von Eckartshausen, René Guenon, and Friedrich Schelling. He was influenced by Rousseau, Pascal, Malebranche, Swedenborg, Johann Georg Gichtel, John Pordage, and, most of all, by Jacob Boehme (Jakob Böhme). He has influenced Éliphas Lévi and Valentin Tomberg.
