= Martinez de Pasqually =

French theurgist and theosopher (1727–1774)

Jacques de Livron Joachim de la Tour de la Casa Martinez de Pasqually (1727?–1774) was a theurgist and theosopher of uncertain origin. He was the founder of the l'Ordre de Chevaliers Maçons Élus Coëns de l'Univers – commonly referred to as the 'Elus Cohens' in 1761. He was the tutor, initiator and friend of Louis-Claude de Saint-Martin and Jean-Baptiste Willermoz.

== Biography ==
Martinez de Pasqually, whose biography is continually being researched, due to the lack of documentation, appears in the history of French freemasonry in 1754.

His exact date and place of birth, as well as his true nationality is unknown. A number of authors proposed that he was a Spanish Jew.

Certain similarities between Pasqually's theurgy and Portuguese hermetic thought led philosopher Sampaio Bruno (1857-1915) to argue that he was probably of Portuguese origin. In 1772 Pasqually went to collect an inheritance in the island of Hispaniola. Grainville, one of his fervent disciples, came from the Caribbean. He died within two years and appears to have influenced early mystic groups in the Caribbean.

== Doctrine ==
The doctrine of Martinez is described as a key to any eschatological cosmology. God, the primordial Unity, had a desire to emanate beings from his own nature, but Lucifer, who wanted to exercise his own creative power, fell victim to his own faults. In his fall, which included his followers, he found himself trapped within an area designated by God to serve as their prison. God sent man, in an androgynous body and endowed with glorious powers, to keep Lucifer's rebels at bay and work towards their reconciliation. Adam prevaricated himself and fell into the very prison he was to contain, becoming a physical and mortal being, and was so thus forced to try to save both himself and the original creation. It can be done via inner perfection with the help of Christ, but also by the theurgic operations that Martinez taught to the men of desire he found worthy of receiving his initiation.

This is obtained by practicing certain rites, where the disciple is to enter into relations with angelic entities that appear in the operations as passes. These are to appear mostly in the form of characters or hieroglyphs of spirits invoked by the operator, as proofs that he is on the proper way of Reintegration.

== Bibliography ==
- Martines of Pasqually, Treatise on the reintegration of beings (from the manuscript of Louis-Claude de Saint-Martin), Diffusion Rosicrucienne, Collection Martin.
- Biographies of Martinez de Pasqually and Pierre Fournié "Abbé Fournié: What We Have Been, What We Are, and What We will Become". Rose Circle Books, 2022.
