= Cesare Reverdino =

Italian engraver

Cesare Reverdino was an Italian engraver, who flourished from 1531 to 1564. He worked in a style between that of Giulio Bonasone and Agostino Veneziano, which suggests that he was of the school of Marcantonio Raimondi. A descriptive catalogue of his engravings can be found in Passavant's Peintre-Graveur.
