= Musi =

Musi may refer to:

== Places ==
- Musi River (Indonesia)
- Musi River (India), Telangana state
- Moosy River, Andhra Pradesh, India

== People ==
- Angelo Musi (1918–2009), American basketball player
- Agostino de' Musi, commonly known as Agostino Veneziano (c. 1490–c. 1540), Italian engraver
- Maria Maddalena Musi (1669–1751), Italian soprano

== Other ==
- Musi language, a Malay language spoken in Indonesia
- Mitsubishi UFJ Securities International (MUSI), a global investment bank based in London

== See also ==
- Mussi
- Musy
