= Mussy =

Mussy may refer to:

- Mussy-la-Fosse, a commune in the French region of Bourgogne-Franche-Comté
- Mussy-sous-Dun, a commune in the French region of Bourgogne-Franche-Comté
- Mussy-sur-Seine a commune in the French region of Grand Est

== Other uses ==
- Noël Guéneau de Mussy (1813–1885), French physician
- Arnaud Mussy (born 1968), French former religious leader
- Mussy, a portmanteau of "man" and "-ussy" (derived from "pussy") used to denote the male anus

== See also ==
- Musy
