= Musy =

Musy is a French surname. Notable people with the surname include:

- Benoît Musy (1917–1956), Swiss motorcycle racer
- Enrico Musy (1901–1966), Italian actor
- Gianni Musy (1931–2011), Italian actor and voice actor
- Jean-Marie Musy (1876–1952), Swiss politician
- Louis Musy (1902–1981), French opera singer and stage director
- Pierre Musy (1910–1990), Swiss bobsledder

== See also ==
- Mussy (disambiguation)
- Musi (disambiguation)
