= Muzzi =

Muzzi is an Italian surname. Notable people with the surname include:

- Antonio Muzzi (1815–1894), Italian painter
- Domenico Muzzi (1742–1812), Italian painter
- Oreste Muzzi (1887–1946), Italian swimmer
- Roberto Muzzi (born 1971), Italian footballer
- Victor Muzzi (born 1993), Brazilian photographer

== See also ==
- Mussi
