= Édouard Kirmisson =

French surgeon (1848–1927)

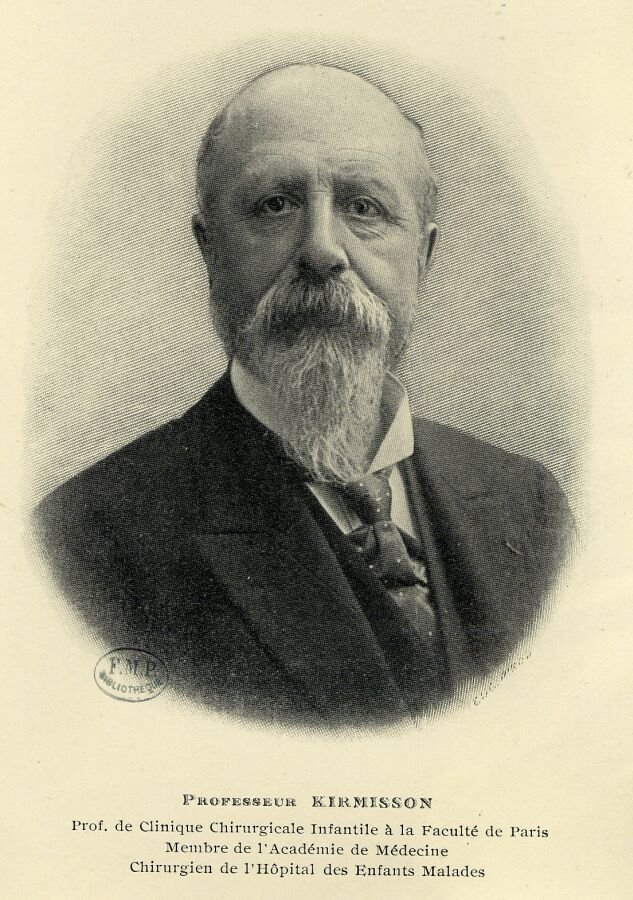
Édouard Kirmisson

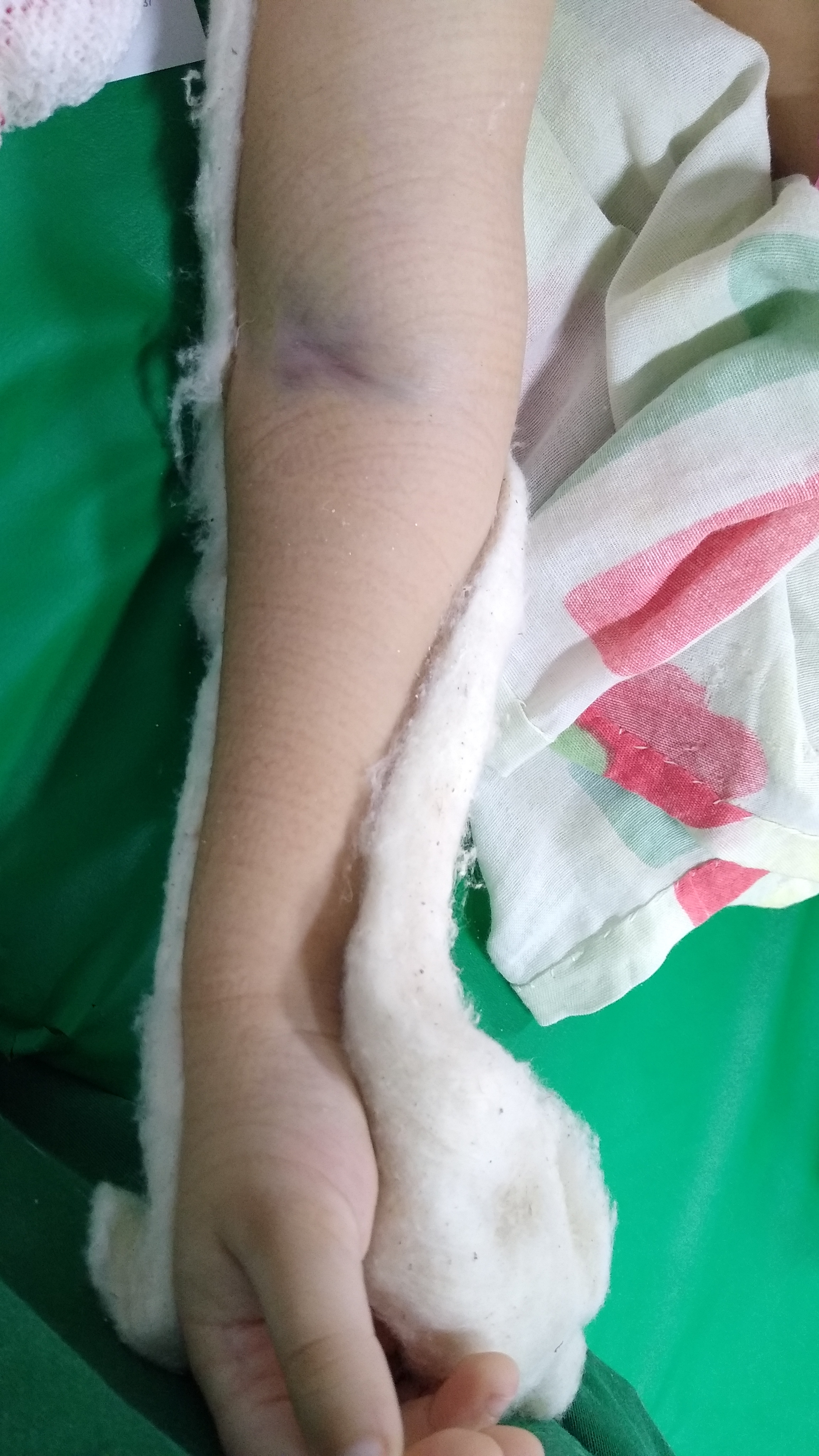
Kirmisson's sign.

Édouard Francis Kirmisson (July 18, 1848 – September 22, 1927) was a French surgeon who was a native of Nantes. He specialized in pediatric and orthopedic surgery.

Kirmisson studied medicine at the École de Médecine in Paris, and later worked as an externe under Noël Guéneau de Mussy (1813–1885) at the Hôtel-Dieu. In 1879 he earned his medical doctorate, obtaining his agrégation in 1883. He spent the following years as a surgeon of Parisian hospitals, becoming a professor of pediatric surgery and orthopedics at Hôpital des Enfants-Malades in 1901.

In 1890 Kirmisson founded the journal "Revue d’orthopédie". In 1903 he became a member of the Académie de Médecine.

== Associated eponyms ==
- "Kirmisson's operation": A surgical process that involves transplantation of the Achilles tendon to the peroneus longus muscle.
- "Kirmisson's sign": Transverse striated ecchymoses at the elbow seen in fractures of the humerus with displacement of the higher fragment.
