= Mussi =

Mussi is an Italian surname. Notable people with the surname include:

- Camillo Mussi (1911–1940), Italian ice hockey player
- Carolina Mussi (born 1988), Brazilian swimmer
- Fabio Mussi (born 1948), Italian politician
- Giuseppe Mussi (1836–1904), Italian politician
- Juan José Mussi (1941–2025), Argentine politician
- Mary Mussi, née Edgar (1907–1991), British writer, known as Mary Howard
- Roberto Mussi (born 1963), Italian footballer

== See also ==
- Muzzi
- Musi (disambiguation)
