= Noël Guéneau de Mussy =

French physician (1813–1885)

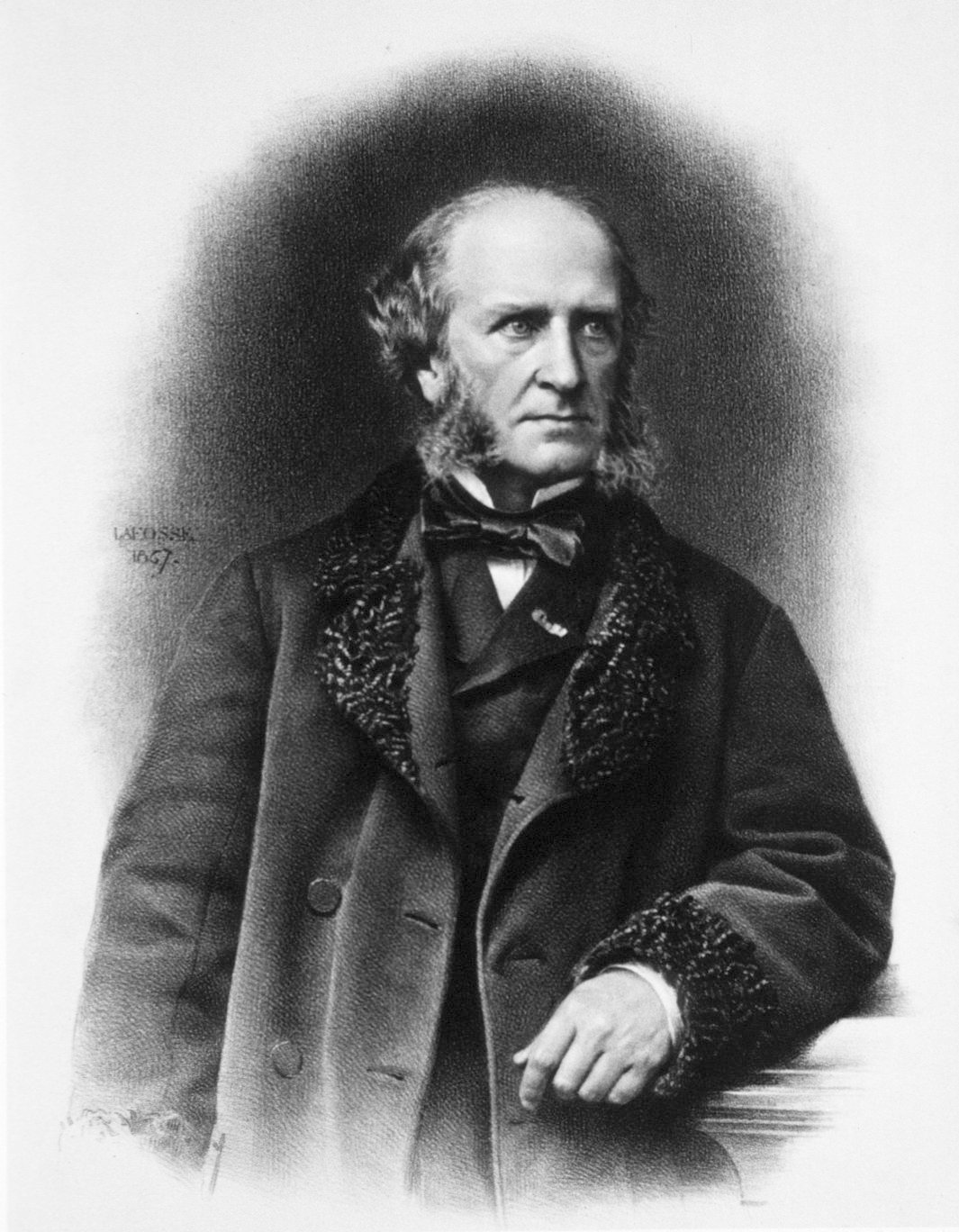
Noël Guéneau de Mussy

Noël-Francois-Odon Guéneau de Mussy (6 November 1813 – 1 June 1885) was a French medical doctor who was a native of Paris. He was the son of writer Philibert Guéneau de Mussy (1776–1854), and grandson to hygienist Jean Noël Hallé (1754–1822).

In 1835 he became an interne to Paris hospitals, and in 1837 received his medical doctorate. In 1842 he became médecin des hôpitaux, working at the Hôpital Saint-Antoine, the Hôpital de la Pitié and the Hôtel-Dieu de Paris. He was a member of the Académie Nationale de Médecine. Two of his better known assistants were ophthalmologist Henri Parinaud (1844–1905) and pediatric surgeon Edouard Francis Kirmisson (1848–1927).

He made contributions in his research of pertussis, hemiglossitis, exophthalmic goitre, and glandular angina. Among his written works was the four-volume Clinique médicale (1874–1885).

His name is lent to the eponymous "Guéneau de Mussy point", an anatomical location germane in cases of diaphragmatic pleurisy. It is located on the left border of the sternum at the end of the bony portion of the tenth rib. If diaphragmatic pleurisy is present, the point becomes exceedingly painful when pressure is applied to it.
