= Marcantonio Raimondi =

16th-century Italian engraver and printmaker

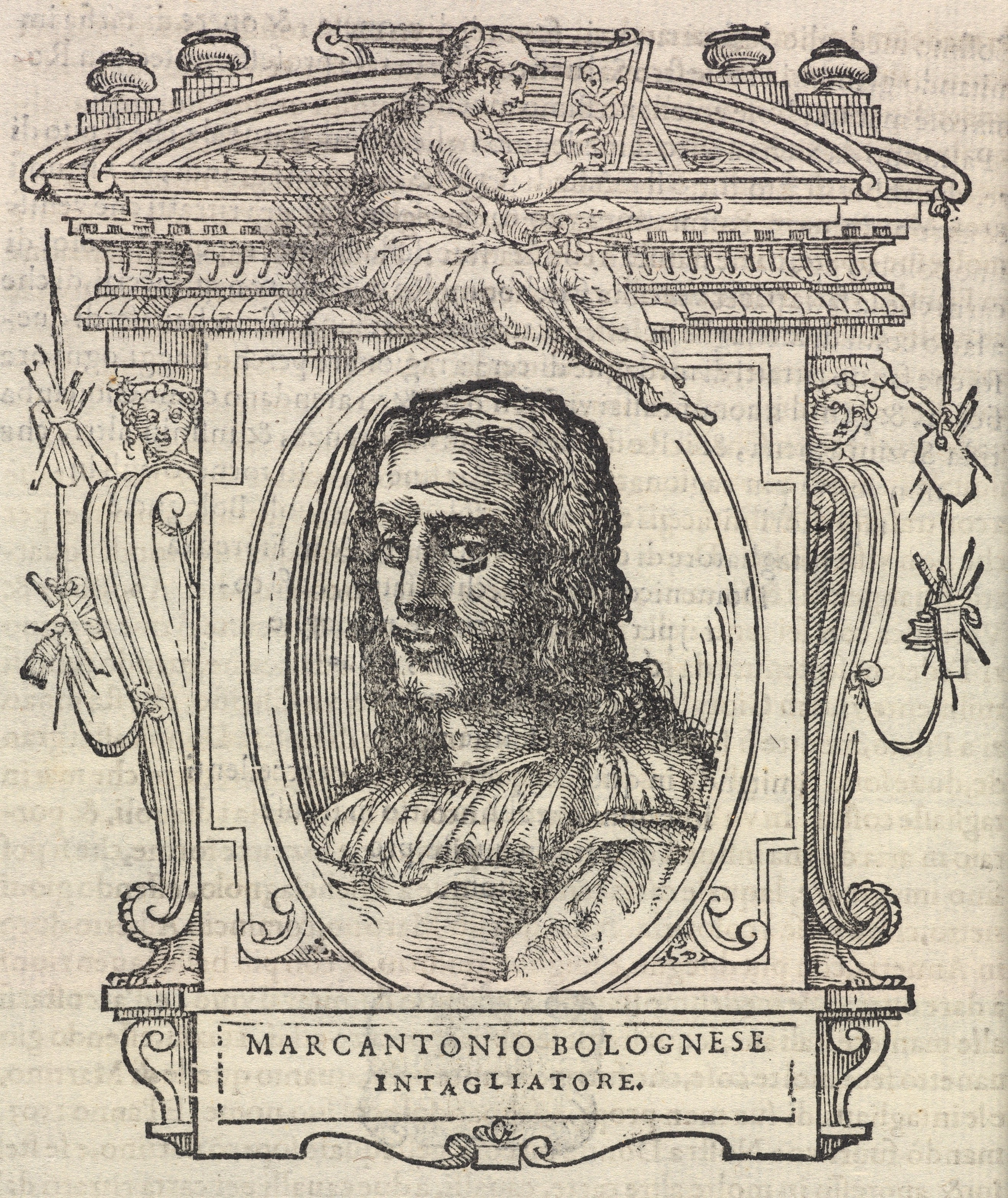
Plate of Marcantonio, from Le vite de’ piv eccellenti pittori, scvltori, e architettori (Fiorenza: Appresso i Giunti, 1568), by Giorgio Vasari

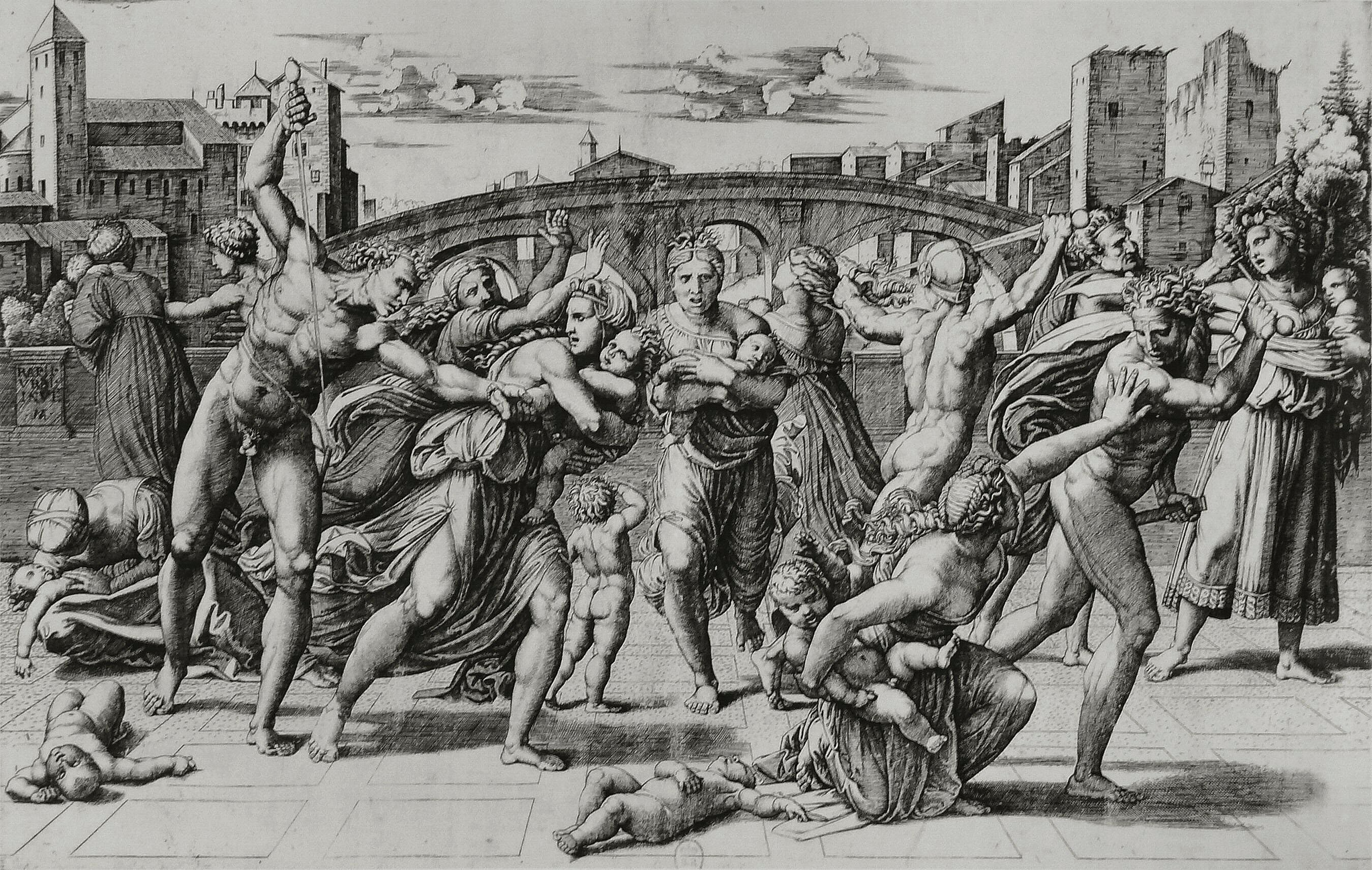
The Massacre of the Innocents, designed by Raphael to be engraved

Marcantonio Raimondi, often called simply Marcantonio (c. 1470/82 – c. 1534), was an Italian engraver, known for being the first important printmaker whose body of work consists largely of prints copying paintings. He is therefore a key figure in the rise of the reproductive print. He also systematized a technique of engraving that became dominant in Italy and elsewhere. His collaboration with Raphael greatly helped his career, and he continued to exploit Raphael's works after the painter's death in 1520, playing a large part in spreading High Renaissance styles across Europe. Much of the biographical information we have comes from his vita in Vasari's Lives of the Artists, the only one of a printmaker.

He is attributed with around 300 engravings. After years of great success, his career ran into trouble in the mid-1520s; he was imprisoned for a time in Rome over his role in the series of erotic prints I Modi, and then, according to Vasari, lost all his money in the Sack of Rome in 1527, after which none of his work can be securely dated.

== Biography ==
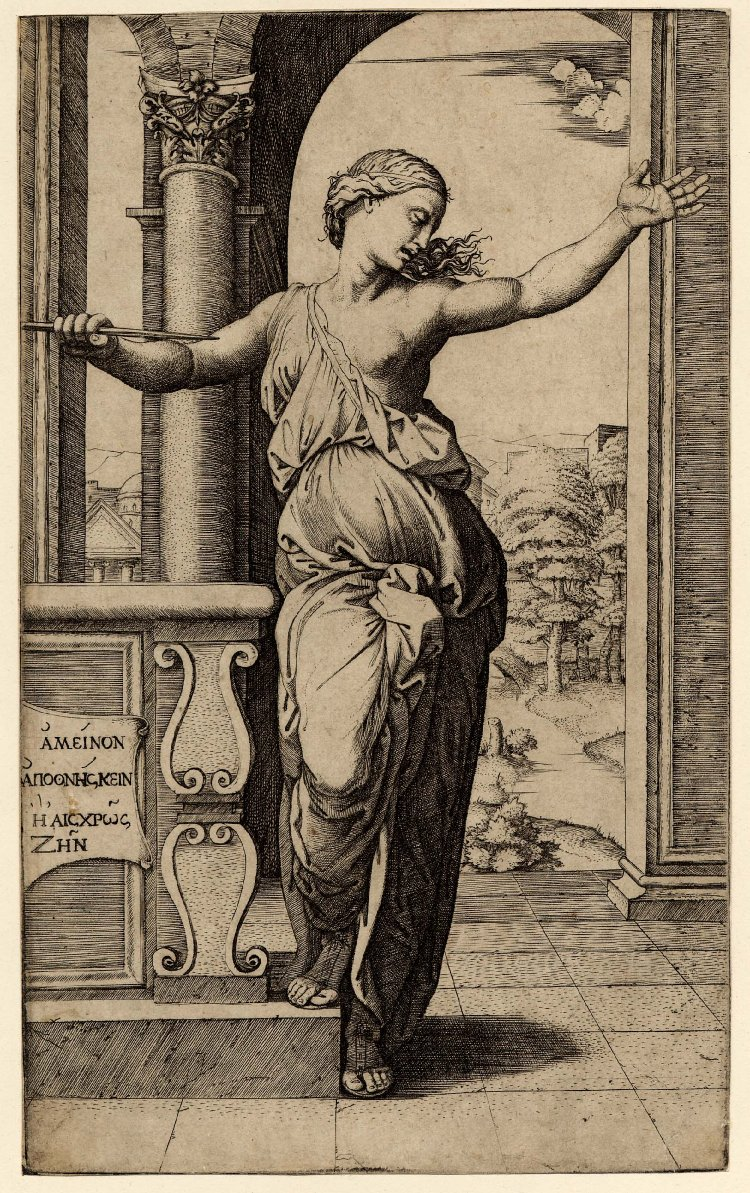
Lucretia, engraved by Raimondi after a design by Raphael.

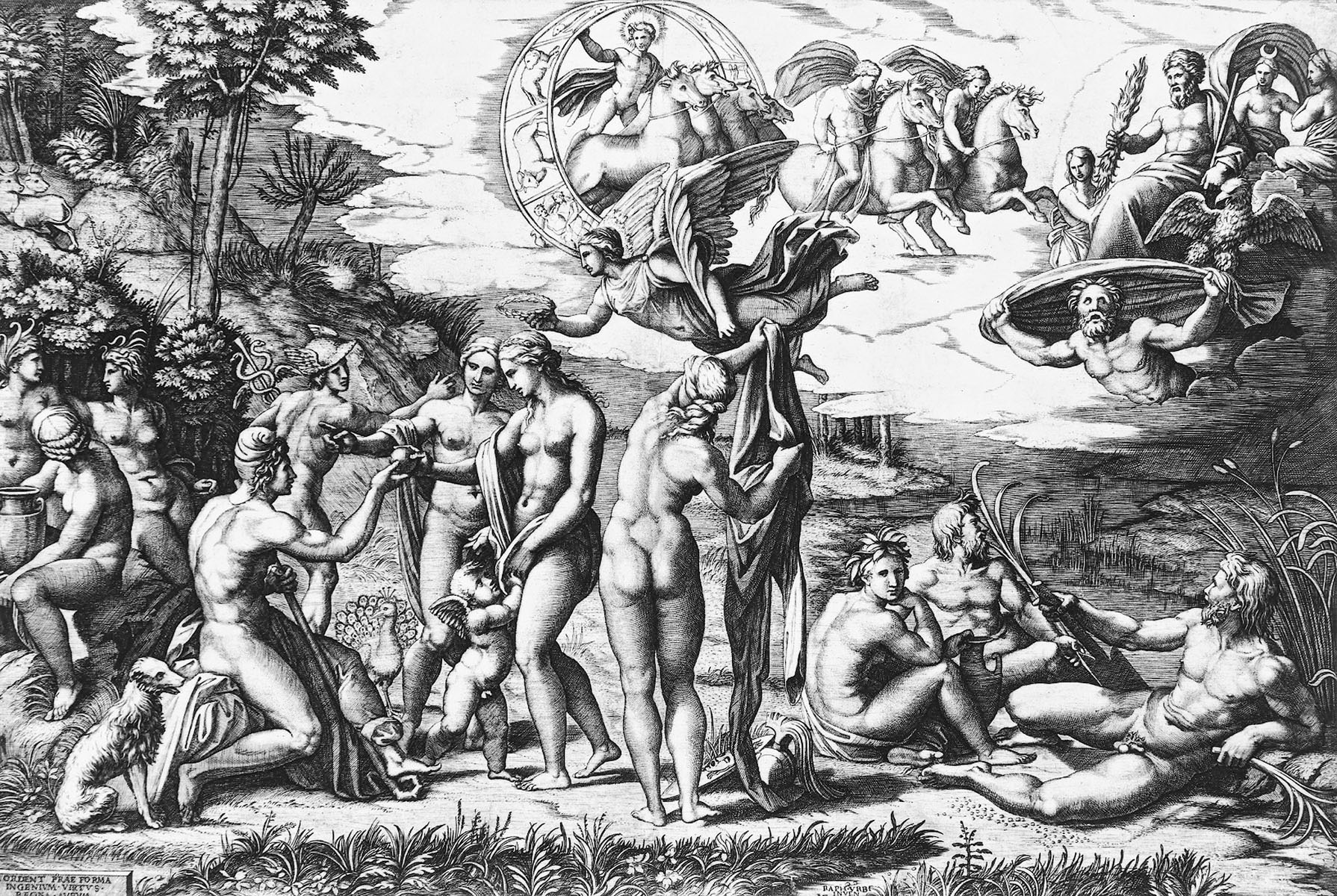
Judgement of Paris, c. 1515, Marcantonio after Raphael

=== Early years ===
Marcantonio's date of birth is unknown, but was by 1482 at the latest. He was possibly born in Argine, near Bologna, Italy, where he is assumed to have grown up. He trained in the workshop of the leading goldsmith and painter in Bologna, Francesco Francia. Vasari claimed that Marcantonio quickly demonstrated more aptitude than Francia, and started designing and producing fashionable waist-buckles (among other items) in niello (engraved metal which is filled in with alloy in a contrasting colour). This is doubted, however, by Arthur Mayger Hind, who sees no evidence of a background in niello technique in his early engravings.

No paintings produced by Marcantonio are known or documented, although some drawings survive. His first dated engraving, Pyramus and Thisbe, comes from 1505, although a number of undated works come from the years before this. From 1505 to 1511, Marcantonio engraved about 80 pieces, with a wide variety of subject matter, from pagan mythology, to religious scenes. His early works use his own compositions, combining elements from Francia and other North Italian artists, and like all Italian printmakers in these years he was strongly affected by the enormously accomplished prints of Dürer, which were widely distributed in Italy. Like other printmakers such as Giulio Campagnola, he borrowed elements of Dürer's landscapes in a cut and paste fashion, and also borrowed from his technique. Dürer was in Bologna in 1506, as was Michelangelo, and he may have met one or both of them.

=== Reproductions ===
About this time he began to make copies of Dürer's woodcut series, the Life of the Virgin. This was extremely common practice, although normally engravers copied other expensive engravings rather than the cheaper woodcuts. However Dürer's woodcuts had raised the standard of the medium considerably, and since Marcantonio continued to copy a large number of both Dürer's engravings and woodcuts, he must have found it profitable.

His early copies included Dürer's famous AD monogram, and Dürer made a complaint to the Venetian Government, which won him some legal protection for his monogram, but not his compositions, in Venetian territory - an important case in the slowly evolving history of intellectual property law.

Marcantonio appears to have spent some of the last half of the decade in Venice, but no dates are known.

=== Rome ===
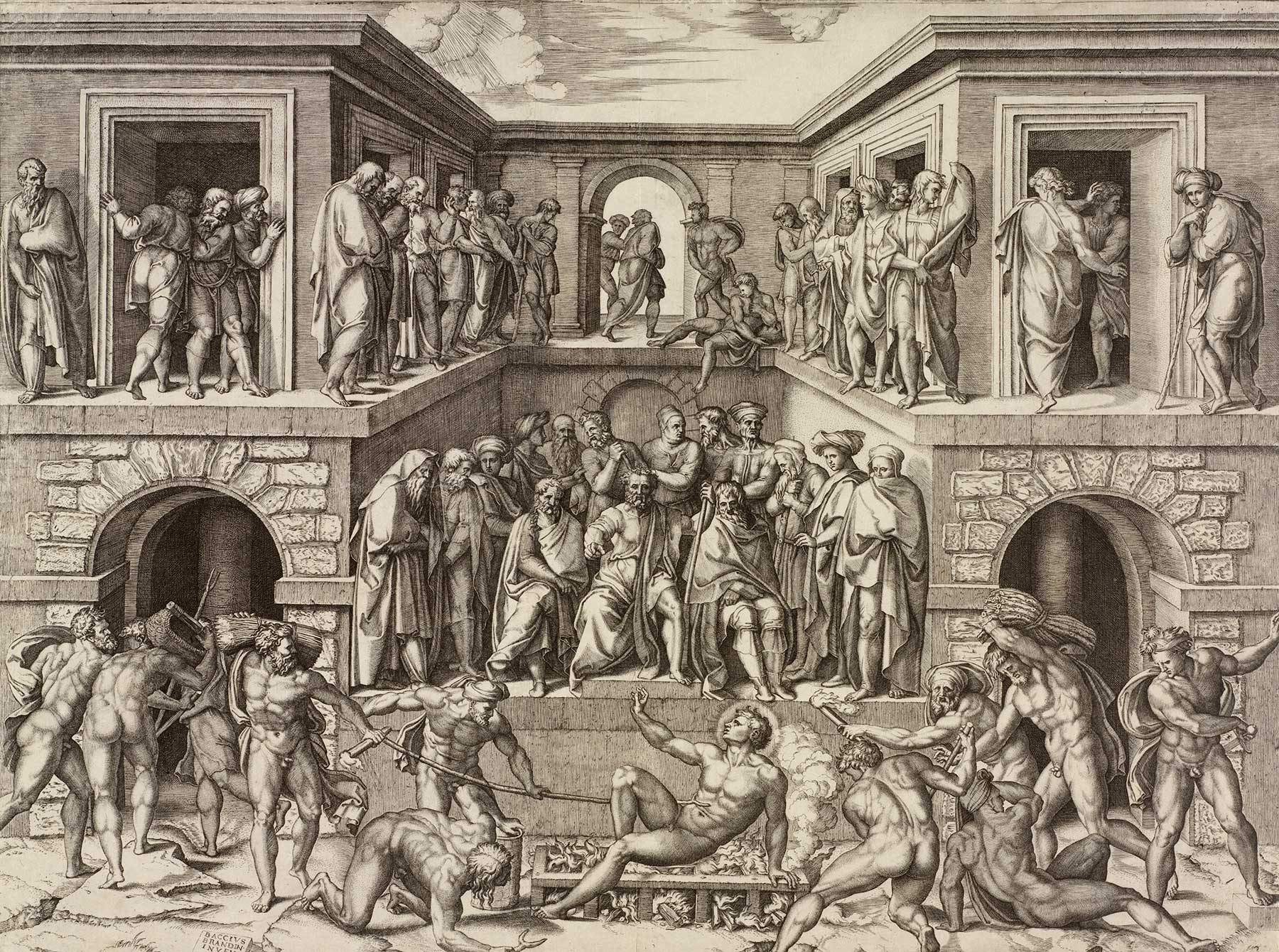
Martyrdom of Saint Lawrence, c 1525

Around 1510, Marcantonio travelled to Rome and entered the circle of artists surrounding Raphael. This influence began showing up in engravings titled The Climbers (in which he reproduced part of Michelangelo's Soldiers surprised bathing, also called Battle of Cascina). After a reproduction of a work by Raphael, entitled Lucretia, Raphael trained and assisted Marcantonio personally.

Another famous engraving, the Judgement of Paris, dated 1515 or 1516, after Raphael, became the composition source for Édouard Manet when he painted The Luncheon on the Grass.

The two started a successful printing establishment under a colorgrinder, Il Baveria, that quickly expanded into an engraving school with Marcantonio at the head. Among his most distinguished pupils were Marco Dente (Marco da Ravenna), Giovanni Jacopo Caraglio and Agostino de Musi (Agostino Veneziano).

=== Later years ===
Marcantonio and his pupils continued to make engravings based upon Raphael's work, even after Raphael's death in 1520. In many instances, Marcantonio would not copy the finished painting, but instead worked from early sketches and drafts. This method produced variations on a theme and were moderately successful.

Around 1524, Marcantonio was briefly imprisoned by Pope Clement VII for making the I modi set of erotic engravings, from the designs of Giulio Romano, which were later accompanied by sonnets written by Pietro Aretino. At the intercession of the Cardinal Ippolito de' Medici, Baccio Bandinelli and Pietro Aretino, he was released, and set to work on his plate of the Martyrdom of St. Lawrence after Bandinelli.

During the Sack of Rome, in 1527, he was forced to pay a heavy ransom by the Spaniards and fled in poverty. It is unclear where he stayed after his departure from Rome until his death in 1534.

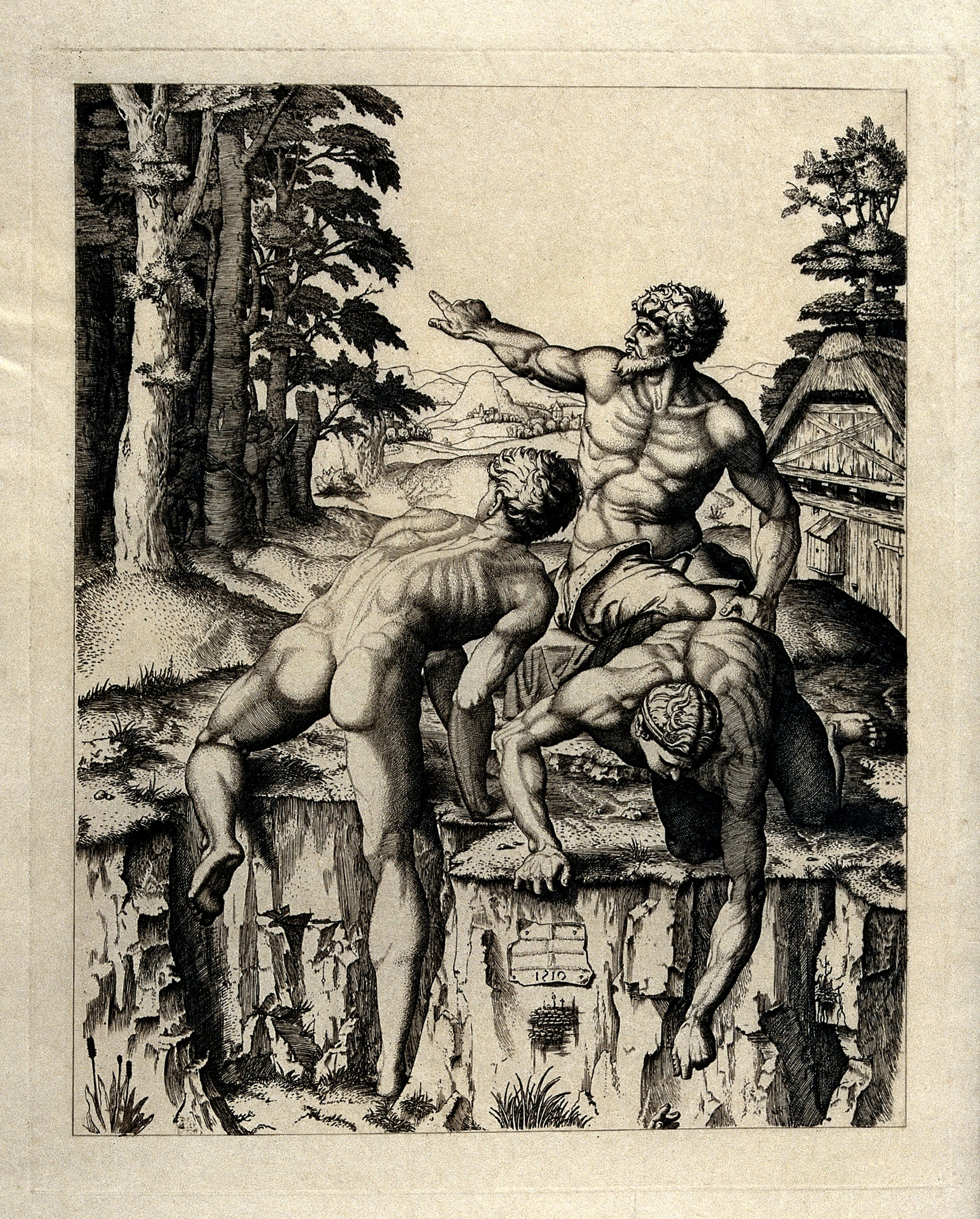
Bathers on the edge of a river, or The Climbers, an important print of 1510, based on a detail of Michelangelo's Battle of Cascina; this was the last print he dated.

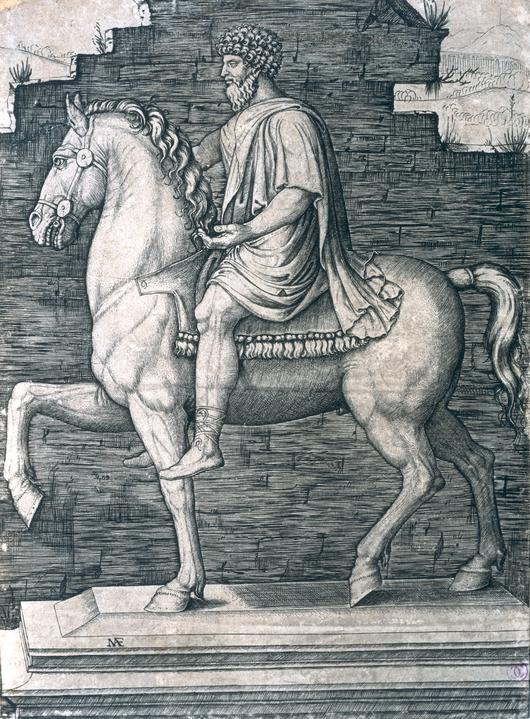
The Equestrian Statue of Marcus Aurelius, one of many prints of antiquities.

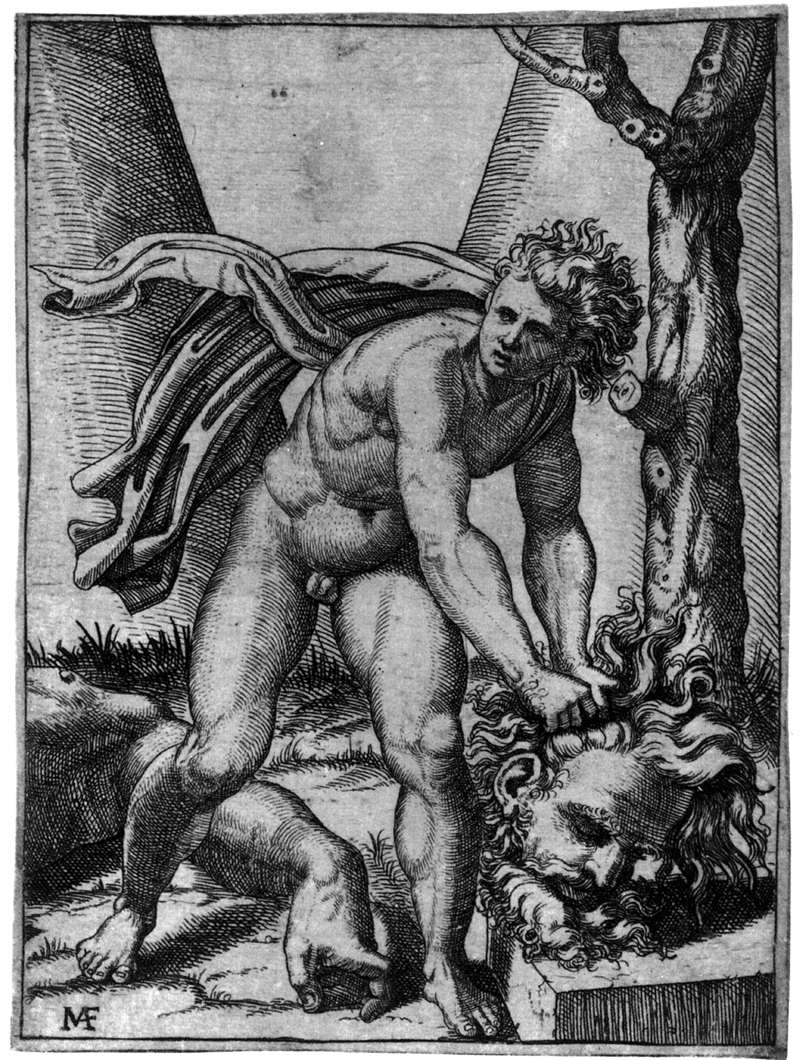
David and Goliath, 1515–16

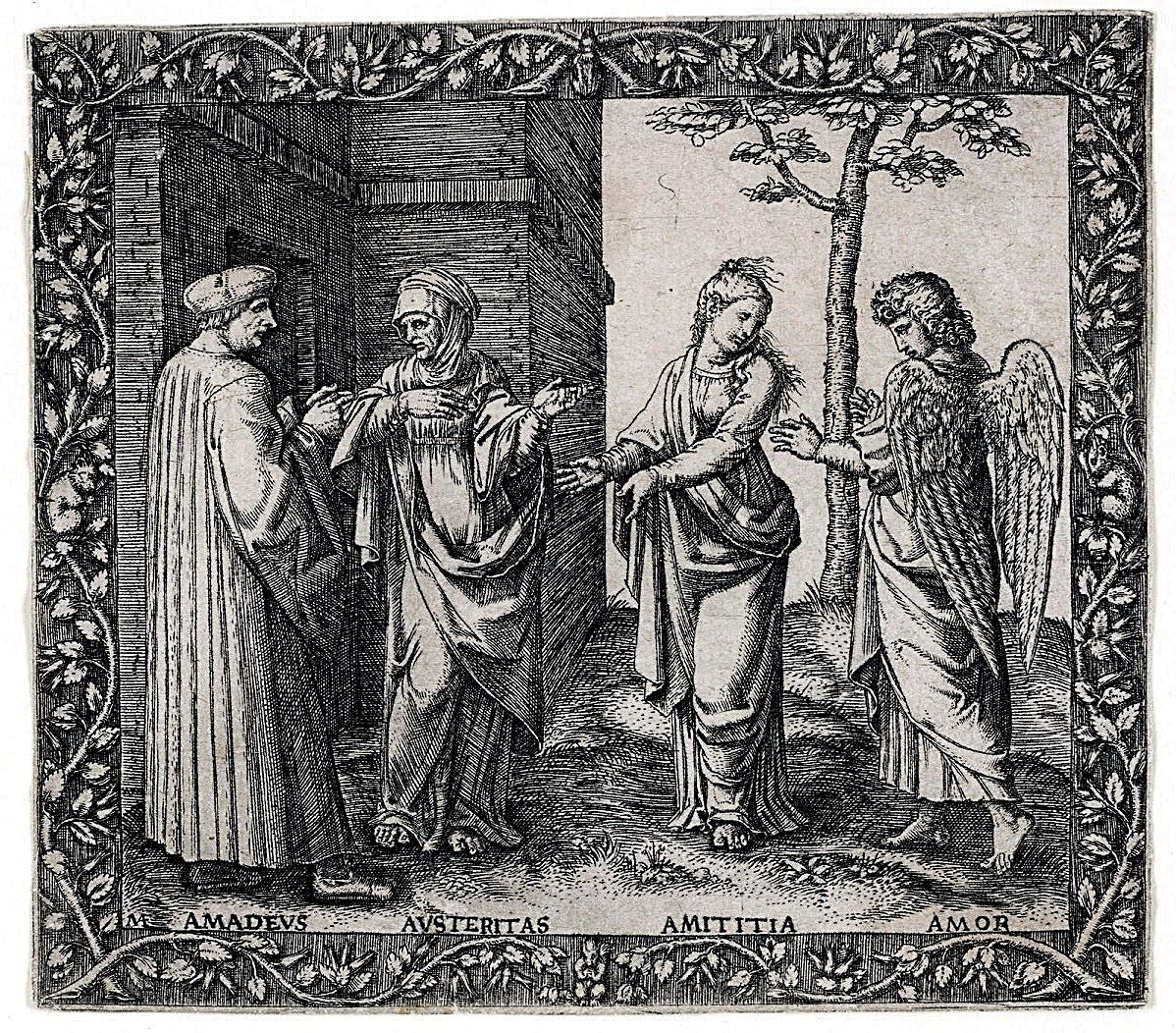
Amadeus Berruti with Austeritas, Amititia, and Amor, с. 1517

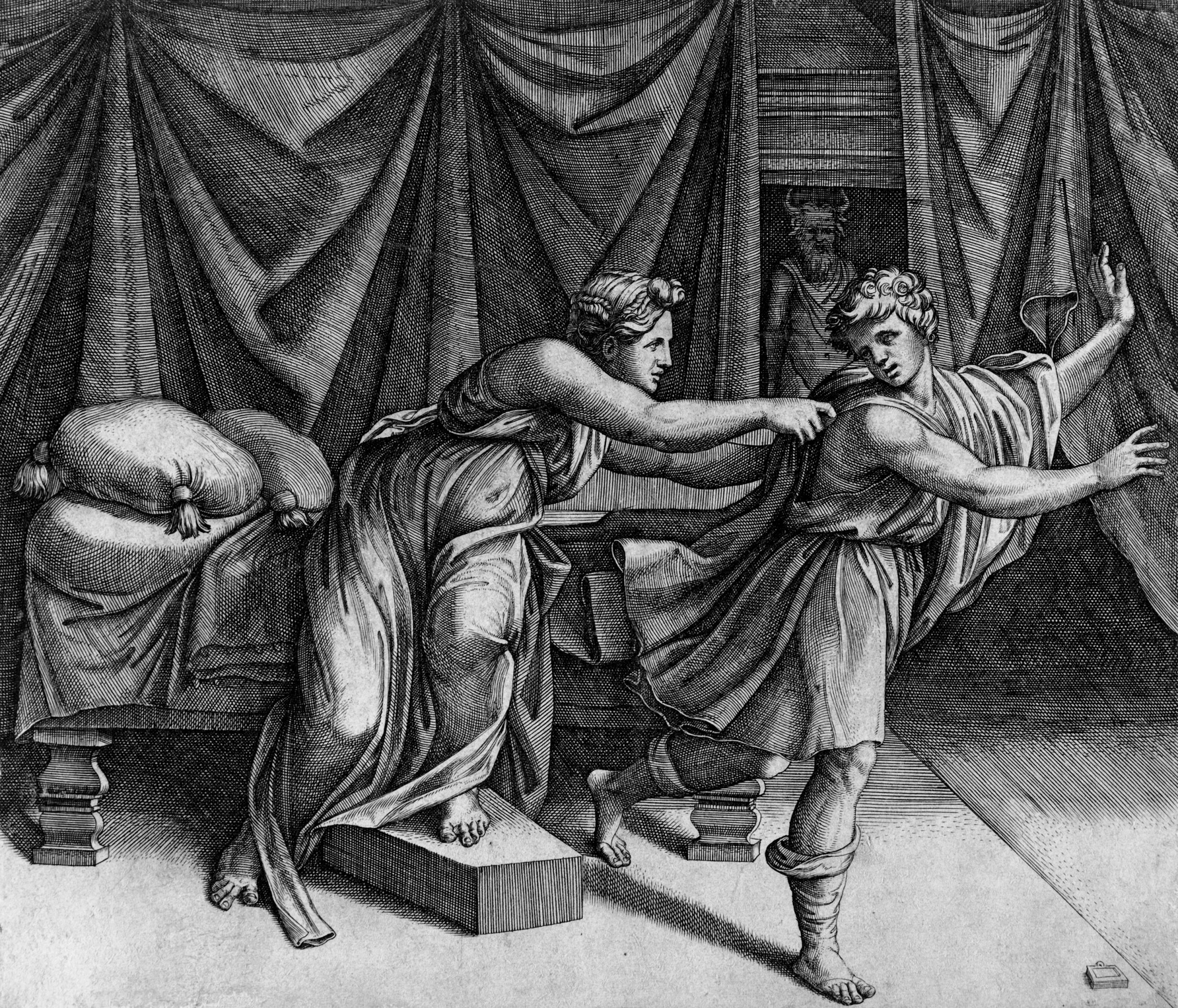
Joseph and Potiphar's Wife, c. 1520

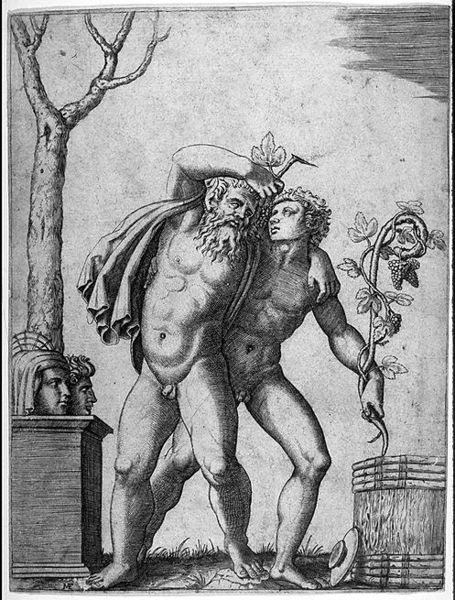
A Young and an Old Bacchant.

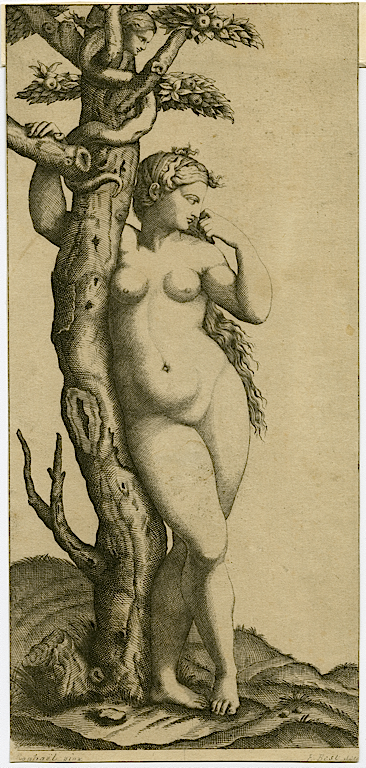
F. Best after Marcantonio Raimondi, Adam and Eve, 19th century, engraving, Department of Image Collections, National Gallery of Art Library, Washington, DC
