= Mitsubishi UFJ Securities International =

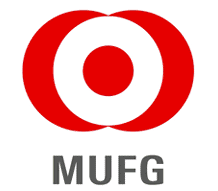
Mitsubishi UFJ Securities International plc

Mitsubishi UFJ Securities International plc (MUSI) was a global investment bank headquartered in London, United Kingdom.

Mitsubishi UFJ Securities International was the investment arm of one of the largest financial institutions in the world, Mitsubishi UFJ Financial Group (MUFG). The investment bank was part of an international network with offices in London, New York City, Hong Kong and Singapore. MUSI was active throughout the global capital markets, focusing on investment banking, debt, equity, commodities, derivatives and structured products. MUSI had a staff of approximately 600 people globally.

== Executive ==
In January 2013, Paul Hartwell was appointed as the CEO of Mitsubishi UFJ Securities International. The company's CFO was David King and its Head of International Business Clifford De Souza.

== History and Ownership ==
Mitsubishi UFJ Securities International was wholly owned by Mitsubishi UFJ Securities Holdings Co., Ltd. (MUSHD), which is itself wholly owned by MUFG. MUSHD's other subsidiaries include Mitsubishi UFJ Morgan Stanley Securities and Mitsubishi UFJ Merrill Lynch PB. MUSI was established on 1 October 2005, when Mitsubishi UFJ Financial Group, was formed by the merger of Mitsubishi Tokyo Financial Group (MTFG) and UFJ Holdings. On the same day, the respective investment banking subsidiaries of MTFG and UFJ, Mitsubishi Securities International plc (established in England and Wales on February 11, 1983) and UFJ International plc (with the merger of Sanwa International plc and Tokai Bank Europe plc in April 2002), were merged to form Mitsubishi UFJ Securities International plc.

On 1 July 2016, the name was changed to MUFG Securities EMEA plc.

== Credit Rating ==
As of October 2012, MUSI held a long-term credit rating of A1 and a short-term credit rating of Prime-1 from Moody's Investors Service.
