= Agostino Veneziano =

Italian engraver (c. 1490 – c. 1540)

- Saint Michael, c. 1514–16, Metropolitan Museum of Art, New York
- Born: Agostino de' Musi c. 1490; Venice, Republic of Venice
- Died: c. 1540; Rome, Papal States
- Occupation: Engraver
- Years active: 1512–1540
- Movement: High Renaissance

Agostino Veneziano ("Venetian Agostino"), whose real name was Agostino de' Musi (c. 1490 – c. 1540), was an important and prolific Italian engraver of the Renaissance.

== Life ==
Veneziano was born in Venice, where he trained as an artist, though his teacher is unknown. He initially copied prints by Albrecht Dürer and Giulio Campagnola from about 1512 to 1514, and then producing his own works, somewhat in the style of the latter. He spent some time in Florence around 1515–1516. He moved to Rome, perhaps as early as 1514, and by 1516 had joined the printmaking workshop of Marcantonio Raimondi, of which he was one of the most important members until it was broken up by the sack of Rome in 1527. Unlike many produced by the workshop, most of Agostino's plates avoided being confiscated and melted down by Charles V's soldiers, and continued to be printed in later years. Agostino returned to Venice after the sack, and later visited Mantua and Florence before returning to Rome in 1531, remaining until at least 1536. It is assumed he died there, though there is no documentation. He was the only major figure whose career spanned the whole period which saw the birth of the reproductive print, and the beginnings of the "industrialization" of Italian printmaking.

== Works ==
Although many of his prints bear his monogram, others do not, and he is a party in several disputed attributions, among them perhaps his most famous print, Lo stregozzo (The Sorcerers), an extravagant fantasy rather atypical of his work. Some works are disputed between him and Campagnola, and later between him and Raimondi or others in his circle; his manner was never very individual, but his technique good enough to allow confusion between his work and those whose style he followed. The Academy of Baccio Bandinelli of 1531 is also an important work, but his many prints after Raphael and Giulio Romano were the best known of his works in his own day. His print known as The Climbers (1521) records a part of a cartoon drawing by Michelangelo for a large painting of the Battle of Cascina for the Palazzo Vecchio in Florence, never completed. He made a large series of prints of the story of Psyche to designs by Michael Coxcie. His career probably never entirely recovered from the Sack of Rome; in Venice his illustrations for Serlio were not used, though he continued to produce prints after Raphael, Giulio Romano and others in his later years, sometimes doing new versions of his older works. In his final Roman period he produced a series of prints of antique vases, that were early examples of the images of antiquities that were to become so common.

Passavant attributed 188 prints to him, though a new total would probably increase this number; 141 prints have his monogram, and probably all are by him.

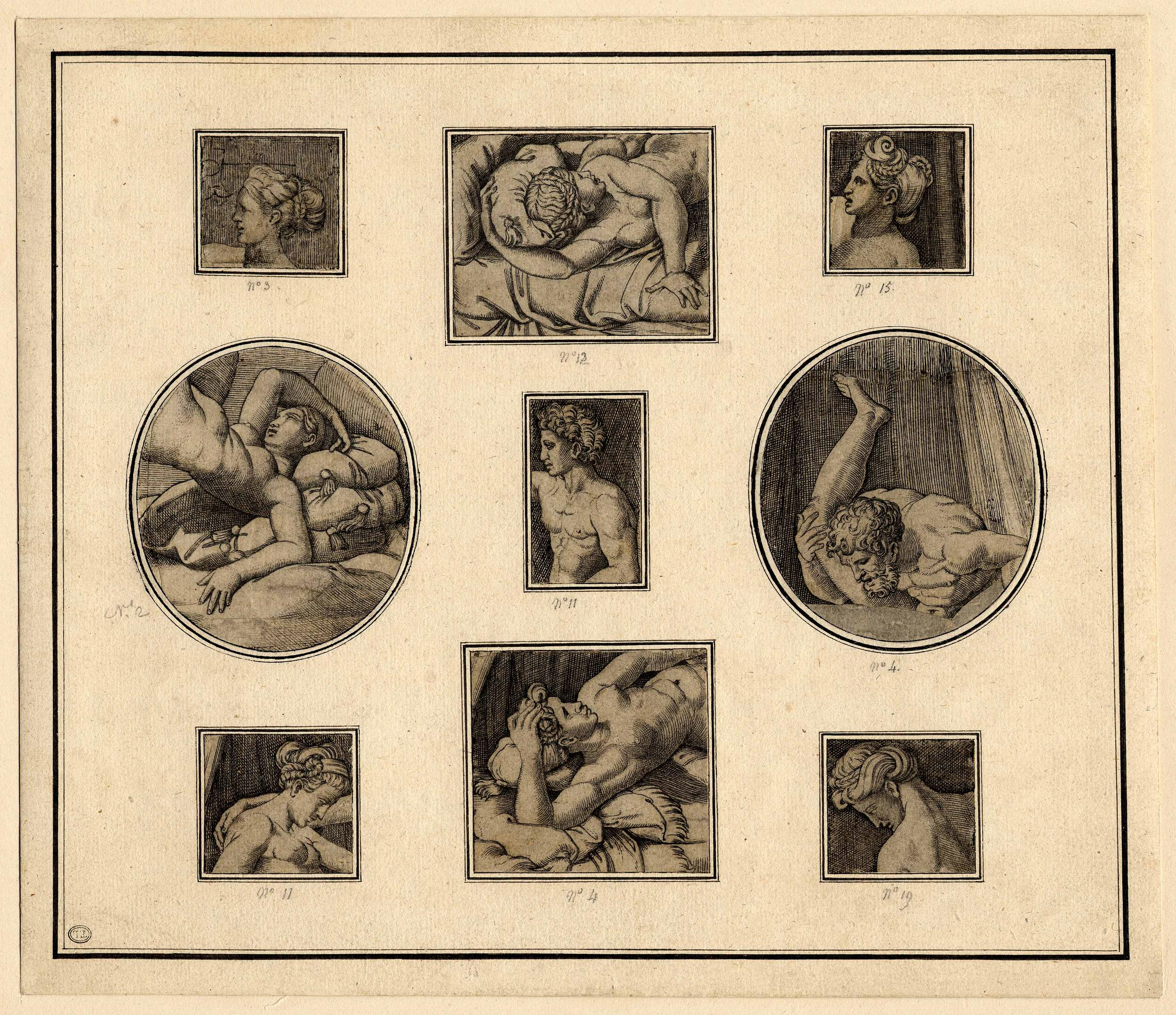
These nine fragments cut from seven engravings are thought to by Agostino Veneziano. It is thought that they were copied from "A set of offsets from Giulio's (Giulio Romano's) Modi drawings." I modi was a book that contained engravings of sexual scenes. Paper. British Museum, London. Around 1530.

=== I Modi ===
It is thought that Agostino Veneziano may have created a single replacement set of engravings for the images created by Giulio Romano and Marcantonio Raimondi in I Modi. There is one whole image and nine fragments cut from seven engravings that are in the British Museum and it is thought that all of these images come from this replacement set of engravings by Agostino.

It is thought that this replacement set of engravings may have been copied from "A set of offsets from Giulio's Modi drawings...". These engravings by Agostino are dated to around 1530. I modi was a book that contained engravings of sexual scenes.

== Bibliography ==
- Minonzio, Donata (1990). "DE MUSI, Agostino, detto Agostino Veneziano". Dizionario Biografico degli Italiani (in Italian). Vol. 38: Della Volpe–Denza. Rome: Istituto dell'Enciclopedia Italiana. ISBN 978-88-12-00032-6.
