= Timeline of planetariums =

This is a timeline of the history of planetariums.

== Historic influences ==
1473 BCE	Egyptian tomb of Senenmut features the earliest known depiction of the sky.
500 BCE	"The Dome of Heaven", built by the Etruscans, is the oldest known domed building.
428/427–348/347 BCE	Greek philosopher Plato discusses his Allegory of the Cave, which analogizes human perceptions of reality with the shadows created by projections of objects against the wall of a cave that is lit by firelight. It is these projected shadows of objects (and not the objects themselves) that become the most important sources of information about the world for most people.
370 BCE	The original sculpture copied by the later Farnese Atlas, which itself features what is probably the oldest preserved rendering of a globe-like object (though it depicts the celestial sphere rather than the Earth), is created in Hellenistic Greece. The Farnese Atlas, a Roman copy which dates to AD 150, is the oldest surviving pictorial record of Western constellations and is now at the National Archaeological Museum in Naples, Italy. The position of the constellations on the sphere's equinox have been used to date the design of the original Greek sphere to 370 BCE. Two other celestial globes believed to date from classical times are the Kugel globe and the Mainz globe.
250 BCE	Archimedes is the first to demonstrate a cast-metal globe showing the motions of the planets. After he was killed by invading Romans, the device was taken to Rome, where it was described by Cicero. Later, Ptolemy's globe is alleged to have even demonstrated the precession of the equinoxes.
50 BCE	The Hathor temple at Dendera dates from Ptolemaic times, probably the 1st century BCE. The temple contains two well-known but slightly different representations of the heavens. There is a round zodiac ceiling and a square zodiac in the outer hypostyle hall. The round zodiac ceiling shows the whole sky as it was understood by both Greek and Egyptian cultures.
62 CE	The Golden House of Nero includes a dome rotating with the sky.
124 CE	The Roman Pantheon is constructed in Rome.
150 CE	Ptolemy's designs for a Celestial Globe are recorded. No actual globe has been found, but detailed notes on its construction have.
531 CE	"Palace of Chosros" at Ctesiphon, near modern Baghdad, Iraq, whose massive 85-foot-high brick arch was said to be painted with stars against a blue background, indicating the zodiac.
840 CE	Abbas Ibn Firnas constructed a device which indicated the movement of the planets and stars in the Universe
1229	Frederick II, Holy Roman Emperor brings to Italy a tent captured during the Fifth Crusade. Now lost, the tent had a cupola-shaped roof with a clockwork mechanism showing moving constellations.
1584	Celestial Globe of Tycho Brahe. Covered with brass and having a wood interior measuring six feet in diameter, with the outer surface divided by circles to show degrees and minutes and stars visible with the naked eye, it was destroyed by fire in 1728. A disadvantage to earlier globes was that they showed the sky in reverse, such that the observer could only view the stars as seen outside the planetsphere.
1654	The Globe of Gottorf is constructed in St. Petersburg. It was about four meters in diameter, weighed over three tons, and could seat several persons inside on a circular bench. The stars were holes in the surface of the globe. The original was destroyed by fire and almost entirely rebuilt in 1748–52.
18th century	Navajo 'Star Ceilings' painted by hand and with 'paint arrows' on overhanging cliff faces in Canyon De Chelly, in modern-day Arizona, United States.
1774	Construction begins on Eise Eisinga's planetarium (actually an orrery) in Franeker, province of Friesland, The Netherlands. Today it is the oldest working planetarium in the world. It was built between 1774 and 1781.
1846	The Carl Zeiss Company is founded. Zeiss produced microscopes in his home workshop. Later collaboration with Ernst Abbe resulted in the first optical instruments produced from theory and plans, rather than from trial and error. Later still, Otto Schott, a glassmaker, introduced a process for producing good quality optical glass reliably, and the company established its reputation as a maker of high-quality optical goods.
1912	The orbitoscope is invented by E. Hindermann in Basel, Switzerland. This instrument is driven by springworks and has two planets revolving about a central Sun. A small light bulb on one of the planets projects shadows of the other two objects in the directions they would be seen from that planet, reproducing accurately the retrograde loops and speed changes. This ingenious device is useful for instruction, but of course had many shortcomings.
1913	The Atwood Globe is built in the Museum of the Chicago Academy of Sciences. With a diameter of almost five meters, the Atwood Globe shows 692 stars, and a moveable light bulb represents the Sun. Apertures along the ecliptic, which can be uncovered as necessary, represent the planets.
	The idea of realistically reproducing the sky in detail is attributed to astronomer (and then privy counselor) Max Wolf. He was involved with the Deutsches Museum. Wolf had suggested to von Miller the idea of a device for his museum which would reproduce not only the stars but also the planetary motions. Von Miller approached the well-known optical firm of Carl Zeiss in Jena, and they agreed to look into the problem.

== Development of modern planetariums ==
1919
Walther Bauersfeld, chief design engineer and later director of Carl Zeiss, hit upon the idea of projection of the celestial objects in a dark room. The original plan had been for some sort of globe similar to that of the 1654 Globe of Gottorf. The new idea simplified things immensely. The mechanism could be on a small scale and easily controllable. Five years of calculations and trials were needed to bring this idea to fruition. Five years, in which Bauersfeld and a large staff of scientists, engineers, and draftsmen considered the astronomical principles involved and the mechanical devices which would realize them. They constructed star plates of film with images of 4500 stars. They found ways of interconnecting the daily and annual motion drives so the planets would stay in proper relative positions. In short they invented the modern projection planetarium.
1923
October 21, 1923: The "Wonder of Jena" had its first unofficial showings in the 16-meter dome which was set up on the roof of the Zeiss factory in Jena, using the first Model I star projector.

The Zeiss Mark I was taken down and shipped to the Deutsches Museum in Munich, Germany, where it was installed in a 10-meter dome, becoming the first true planetarium.

Elis Stromgren wrote: "Never before was an instrument created which is so instructive as this; never before one so bewitching; and never before did an instrument speak so directly to the beholder. The machine itself is precious and aristocratic… The planetarium is school, theater, and cinema in one classroom under the eternal dome of the sky."
1925
May 7, 1925: World premiere of the "Wonder of Jena" (Das Wunder von Jena) at the Deutsches Museum in Munich.
1927
First planetarium built outside Germany, a temporary installation in Vienna, Austria.
1928
Rome planetarium opens.
1929
Moscow planetarium opens.
1930
Five new planetariums, including ones in Stockholm, Milan, Hamburg, a new one for Vienna, and the first outside of Europe. In 1928, Max Adler, a Chicago philanthropist, heard of the "Wonder of Jena" and took his wife and an architect to Germany to see it. He was so impressed, he donated to his home city the first planetarium in the Americas. On May 12, 1930, the Adler Planetarium greeted its first visitors.
1934
Frank & John Korkosz begin work on the first optical projection planetarium built in the United States

The Fels Planetarium opens January 1, 1934 at Philadelphia's Franklin Institute Science Museum, using a Zeiss Mark II projector.
1935
The planetarium at Griffith Observatory opened on May 14 and the Hayden Planetarium on October 2. During these years, other instruments began to show the sky in Sweden, Belgium, and the Netherlands. Except for the latter, all were Zeiss Mark IIs.
1936
The Rosicrucian Park planetarium opens in San Jose, California. It is the fifth built in the United States, and one of the first to have a star projector built in the US, constructed by hand by H. Spencer Lewis, then leader of the Rosicrucian Order, AMORC.
1937
Osaka planetarium opens, Seymour Planetarium dedicated.
1938
Tokyo planetarium opens.
1939
The Buhl Planetarium opens in Pittsburgh, Pennsylvania.
1944
The only large planetarium installation by the Carl Zeiss Company was in Goteborg, Sweden. The Mark II projector was removed to the Morehead Planetarium in Chapel Hill, North Carolina, United States, in 1949.
1947
Armand N. Spitz designs a small, less expensive projector with a dodecahedron design. Within ten years the number of US planetariums rises from five to almost 200.
1949
In May, Morehead Planetarium opened on the University of North Carolina at Chapel Hill campus; it is the first planetarium on a university campus in the United States. Spitz Laboratories was founded, first in an old factory building and then in an old theater. The first Spitz projector was demonstrated to a meeting of astronomers at Harvard College Observatory in the late-1940s. As the enterprise grew, they later moved to an old snuff factory in Yorklyn, Delaware, and are now located in a spacious new factory in Chadds Ford, Pennsylvania, U.S. The company has changed its corporate ownership several times in its brief history and is now owned by Evans & Sutherland.

McMaster University in Hamilton, Ontario, purchased its first projector, and the McCallion Planetarium became the first planetarium in the province to offer public shows.

1952
After the war neither of Zeiss's two main factories in Oberkochen and Jena were capable of building a planetarium projector. Because of this, the California Academy of Sciences in San Francisco commissioned a comparable, one-of-a-kind projector for the Morrison Planetarium, the first for a U.S. planetarium dome larger than 50 feet across. After four years of design and construction, it was debuted to the public on November 8. It operated through 2003.
1955
The Surveyor Germán Barbato Municipal Planetarium opens in Montevideo, Uruguay, the first planetarium in all of Latin America and the first in the southern hemisphere. With a dome of 18.3 m (60 ft) in diameter and a renovation in 2019 it remains in use to this day.
1958
The Charles Hayden Planetarium opens at the Museum of Science in Boston, featuring another large American-built projector by the Korkosz brothers. While all earlier planetariums (and nearly all subsequent) show only the planets from Mercury through Saturn, this one-of-a-kind projector also shows the planet Uranus, usually not counted as being of naked eye visibility, and so left out of planetarium projections.
1959
Seizo Goto, a leading Japanese industrialist, used the expertise of his company in the field of telescopes to produce the first Goto planetarium. After trials in Japan, the first Goto in the United States filled the sky with stars in Bridgeport, Connecticut, on January 20, 1962. The Goto company was actually the first to produce a small projector which included planetary motions. Many Goto instruments have since been installed all over the world, a large number in the U.S.
1963
The Fleischmann Atmospherium Planetarium is built on the University of Nevada-Reno campus. It was the first planetarium in the nation to feature a 360-degree projector capable of providing horizon-to-horizon images and through time-lapse photography showing an entire day's weather in a few minutes.
1965
Minolta Company of Japan, known for high-quality cameras and optics, makes some tentative entries into the field in the mid-1960s. Their first planetarium was at DeAnza College in California. By the late 1960s, Minolta had decided to officially enter the planetarium business.
1966
Phillip Stern, a former lecturer at the Hayden Planetarium and director of the Bridgeport Planetarium, develops the first programmable planetarium, the Apollo model. Unable to finance this himself, he has a small audio-visual firm on Long Island, Viewlex, manufacture and market the planetarium, mostly to schools. Later this is joined by the first model to be portable, with an inflatable dome.

== Digital and Fulldome video ==
1983	First Evans & Sutherland Digistar I calligraphic scan (projection of light points and lines – also known as a vector scan) planetarium projector at the Science Museum of Virginia in Richmond, Virginia, United States.
1995	First Evans & Sutherland Digistar II calligraphic scan planetarium projector opens at the London Planetarium, UK.
1996	July 13–19: First Goto Virtuarium is demonstrated at the International Planetarium Society Conference in Osaka, Japan.
	October 26–29: Evans & Sutherland StarRider demonstrated at ASTC in Pittsburgh, Pennsylvania, United States.
1998	June 28 – July 2: Sky-Skan premieres SkyVision at the International Planetarium Society Conference in London, UK, demonstrating the first digital fulldome playback animation.
1999	The Adler Planetarium reopens in Chicago, Illinois, United States, with an Evans & Sutherland StarRider system.
2000	The Hayden Planetarium reopens at the American Museum of Natural History in New York, New York, United States, with a Silicon Graphics Onyx 2 and Trimension video system.
2001	The first mirror-projector combination is demonstrated at the Western Alliance of Planetariums conference in Eugene, Oregon, United States.
2003	The Clark Planetarium reopens in Salt Lake City, Utah, United States, with an Evans & Sutherland Digistar 3.
	Eugenides Foundation New Digital Planetarium of Athens, Greece, reopens with both a Sky Skan SkyVision and an E & S Digistar-3 system under a completely new dome with a diameter of 25 meters replacing the original Carl Zeiss Mark IV Electromechanical Projector
	The Nehru Planetarium in Mumbai, has Digistar-3 Planetarium equipment installed, replacing the earlier Carl Zeiss Universal Projector.
	The Adler Planetarium upgrades their StarRider to the new Evans & Sutherland Digistar 3 system; a mini-dome opens in their production department running both Digistar 3 SP and Producer systems.
2005	The Thinktank Planetarium, the UK's first purpose-built digital planetarium, opens in Birmingham and almost immediately supplements daytime astronomy education shows with evening fulldome art and entertainment content.
2008	The INTECH Planetarium at INTECH hands-on science centre, in Winchester, is the UK's largest digital planetarium. Global Immersion Fidelity Bright is an immersive theatre experience which can be geared towards key stages 2–5.
2008	The Morrison Planetarium at California Academy of Sciences reopens in Golden Gate Park, San Francisco, California, United States. Global Immersion Fidelity Bright solution with Global Immersion Media Server, SCISS' Uniview and Sky-Skan DigitalSky2 cluster inputs are featured in a 90-foot, 290-seat planetarium.
2010	The Morehead Planetarium and Science Center replaced its Zeiss Mark VI star projector with a new fulldome digital projection system and released its first original fulldome planetarium show, "Earth, Moon and Sun," for international distribution.
