= Ralph Lewis =

Ralph Lewis may refer to:

- Ralph Lewis (basketball) (born 1963), American basketball player
- Ralph Lewis (actor) (1872–1937), American actor
- Ralph Maxwell Lewis, Imperator of Rosicrucian organisation Ancient Mystical Order Rosae Crucis (AMORC) from 1939 to 1987
- Ralph Lewis (1928–2017), founding member of the band Sons of Ralph
