= Gary L. Stewart =

American writer and mystic (born 1953)

- Born: Gary Lee Stewart; February 26, 1953 (age 73); Stockton, California, United States
- Organization: AMORC
- Title: Imperator of AMORC
- Term: 1987–1990
- Predecessor: Ralph Maxwell Lewis
- Successor: Christian Bernard

Gary Lee Stewart (born February 26, 1953) is an American Rosicrucian who was the Imperator of the Rosicrucian order AMORC from 1987 to 1990. After internal allegations of embezzlement of $3.5 million, Stewart was ousted as leader by the organization's board of directors. Stewart was found innocent of the charges but never returned to AMORC. Stewart later founded his own orders, among them the Confraternity of the Rose Cross and the Order of the Militia Crucifera Evangelica (OMCE).

== Early life ==
Gary Lee Stewart was born on February 26, 1953, in Stockton, California. His father served in the United States Air Force, so he moved around frequently. In his youth, he had an interest in purported paranormal phenomena. Stewart graduated from California State University, Fresno with a BA in philosophy.

== AMORC ==
Stewart was a member of the Rosicrucian order AMORC (Ancient and Mystical Order of the Rosae Crucis), which then had about 250,000 members worldwide. He was initially a clerk, but became close to its imperator (leader) Ralph Maxwell Lewis, and he designated him his successor.

Come Ralph Lewis's death in 1987, Stewart was chosen as his successor by the order. He was the third imperator of AMORC; the position was usually held for life. Stewart was young, at 34, but was able to be elected with the support of the leader of the powerful French branch, Raymond Bernard. Stewart planned to use his position in AMORC to fund human rights initiatives.

=== Ousting ===
In 1990, after what was described by sociologist David V. Barrett as a "bitter dispute" with the order's board of directors, or "an apparent coup", though circumstances are generally uncertain, Stewart was accused of embezzling $3.5 million from the group to an Andorran bank account. He claimed this was to be used as collateral for human rights activism on behalf of AMORC. Stewart was then forced out of AMORC in a unanimous vote by the board of directors. They withdrew Stewart's authority; with it, the order as a whole was reorganized. Stewart was succeed as Imperator of AMORC by the head of AMORC's French chapter, Christian Bernard. He initially refused to leave until a suit was filed and the police came to enforce the resulting restraining order. He denied all allegations and countersued the order for $31 million, alleging that the order had funds missing. This whole saga resulted in an abundance of local media attention.

According to Stewart, at the time he had expressed concern that the original texts of Lewis and his father, the founder of AMORC Harvey Spencer Lewis, had been altered in the last years of his life without his knowledge and substantially altered in an effort to modernize the texts. He also accused Bernard and the grand master of German AMORC Wilhelm Raab of having made their own changes to AMORC doctrine, which he said resulted in the different language branches of AMORC having entirely different teachings. He said that when he had questioned this he had been ousted. The money was later returned to the order and in 1993 Stewart was found innocent of all accusations of embezzlement, but remained alienated from the order, never returning to it. The case was dismissed with prejudice.

== Later life ==
Scholar Kjersti Løken noted he was "seldom mentioned" by the order afterwards, and said that "his three years in office are all but deleted from AMORC's history". A lengthy internal account, Christian Rebisse's Rosicrucian History and Mysteries, mentions him a singular time in passing, writing that he was "dismissed" after "a series of grave errors". When the Nordic grand master Live Söderlund was asked why he had been removed, she replied that Stewart had lost their trust and confidence.

The leadership battle likely resulted in a large loss of membership for AMORC. It resulted in a schism when some Rosicrucians continued to support Stewart, forming Ancient Rosae Crucis (ARC), which merged with Stewart's office. He also merged his office with the British Martinist Order, and later founded another order, the Order of the Militia Crucifera Evangelica (OMCE). Stewart believed that since he had been officially appointed by Lewis, his appointment as Imperator was for life, regardless of the organization. In 1992, the Nordic branch of AMORC underwent a conflict over the modernization of AMORC doctrine leading to the expulsion of a local leader, which resulted in several former AMORC members from that branch contacting Stewart and joining his ARC group. They formed a Nordic branch, the Den Norske Orden av Rosen og Korset..

Stewart left ARC in 1996, though they continued to share his concerns over revisions of the order's original texts. That year, Stewart founded his own Rosicrucian order with three ARC founders, the Confraternity of the Rose Cross, which he presents as teaching the original version of Lewis's Rosicrucianism before it was corrupted. According to Stewart, teachings are largely based on the "Nodin Manuscript", the second half of the document passed down from Imperator to Imperator; Stewart never gave it back after he was ousted, so he had the only copy.
