= Rosicrucian Egyptian Museum =

Museum in San Jose, California

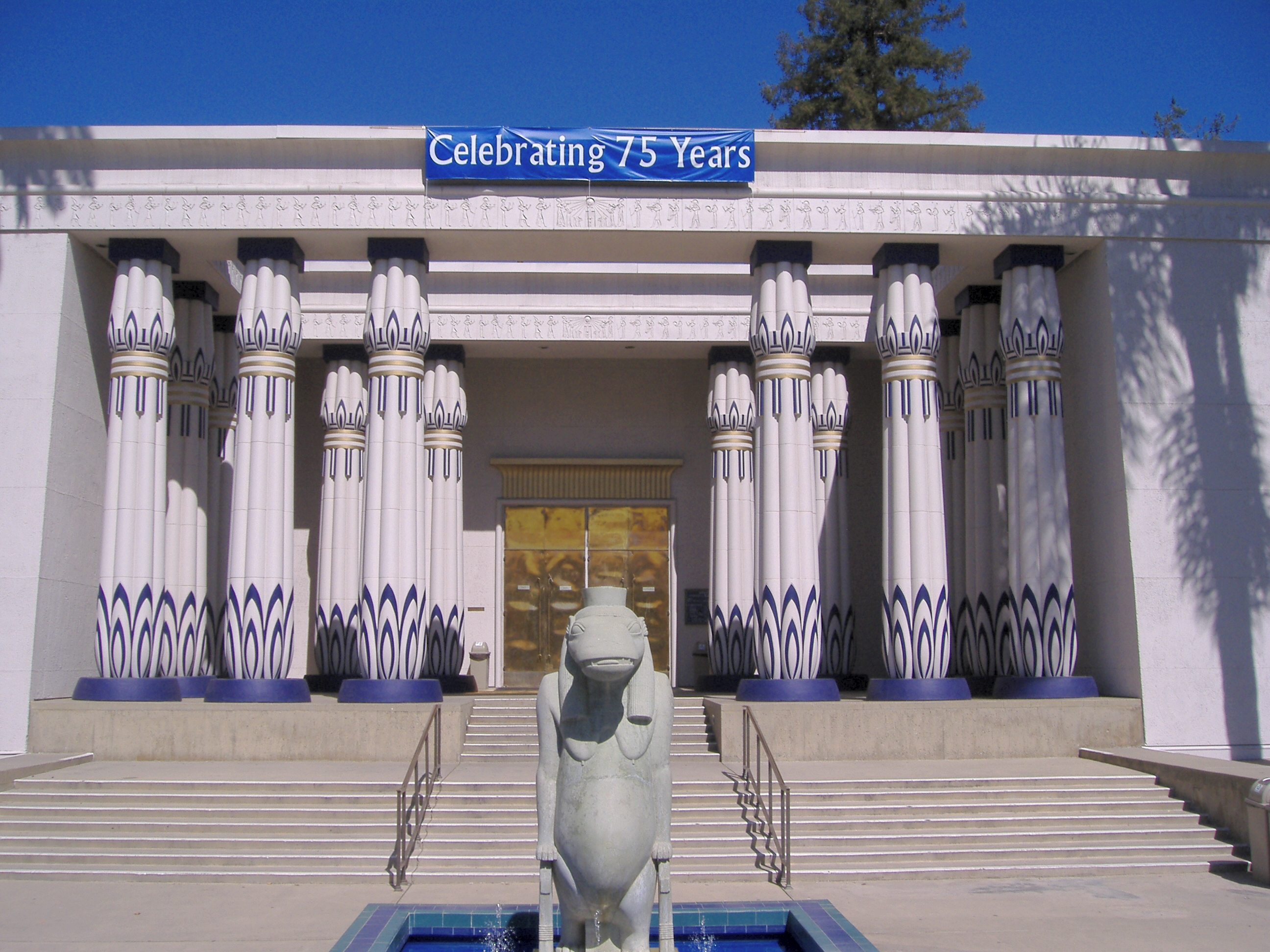
- Karnak-style entrance to the Rosicrucian Egyptian Museum, with statue of Tawaret
- Established: November 1966; 59 years ago
- Location: San Jose, California, United States
- Coordinates: 37°20′03″N 121°55′24″W
- Type: Archaeological museum
- Visitors: 110,000 (2017)
- Founder: Harvey Spencer Lewis
- Director: Julie Scott
- Website: www.egyptianmuseum.org

The Rosicrucian Egyptian Museum (REM) is a museum devoted to ancient Egypt, located at Rosicrucian Park in the Rose Garden neighborhood of San Jose, California, United States.

It was founded by the Ancient Mystical Order Rosae Crucis (AMORC). The Rosicrucian order continues to support and expand the museum and its educational and scientific activities. The museum holds the largest collection of ancient Egyptian antiquities in the Western United States, and is located next to the AMORC headquarters.

== History ==
The founder of AMORC, Harvey Spencer Lewis, was a collector of various artifacts with mystical symbolism, some of them from the East. His very first artifact was a small Sekhmet statue. In 1921 he contributed financially to the archaeological excavations at Tel el Amarna (Akhetaten, the capital city of the 18th dynasty pharaoh Akhenaten) of the Egypt Explorations Society of Boston by receiving donations from AMORC members. In return, the Egypt Explorations Society donated several Egyptian antiquities to AMORC.

In 1928, he presented to the public a collection named "The Rosicrucian Egyptian Oriental Museum", located at the administration buildings of AMORC at San Jose, California. Supposedly, the San Jose location was chosen because of the affordability of the land at the time. After Lewis' tour in Egypt in 1929, AMORC received many more artifacts and donations, and as a result the collection grew significantly, with more than 2000 exhibits.

The second Imperator of AMORC, Ralph Maxwell Lewis, son of H. Spencer Lewis, built new buildings for the museum, which opened in November 1966.

By that time the museum was unique in:

- Having the largest exhibition of Ancient Egyptian antiquities in the Western US.
- Being the only such museum in the world with buildings constructed in Ancient Egyptian architectural style.
- Having a purpose-built planetarium adjacent to the museum, the fifth opened in the United States, and the first with a Star Projector built in the country, constructed by H. Spencer Lewis.
- Having its buildings set in an Egyptian Revival park.

In 1995, Julie Scott, M.A., S.R.C., who is a practicing Rosicrucian, became director of the Rosicrucian Egyptian Museum.

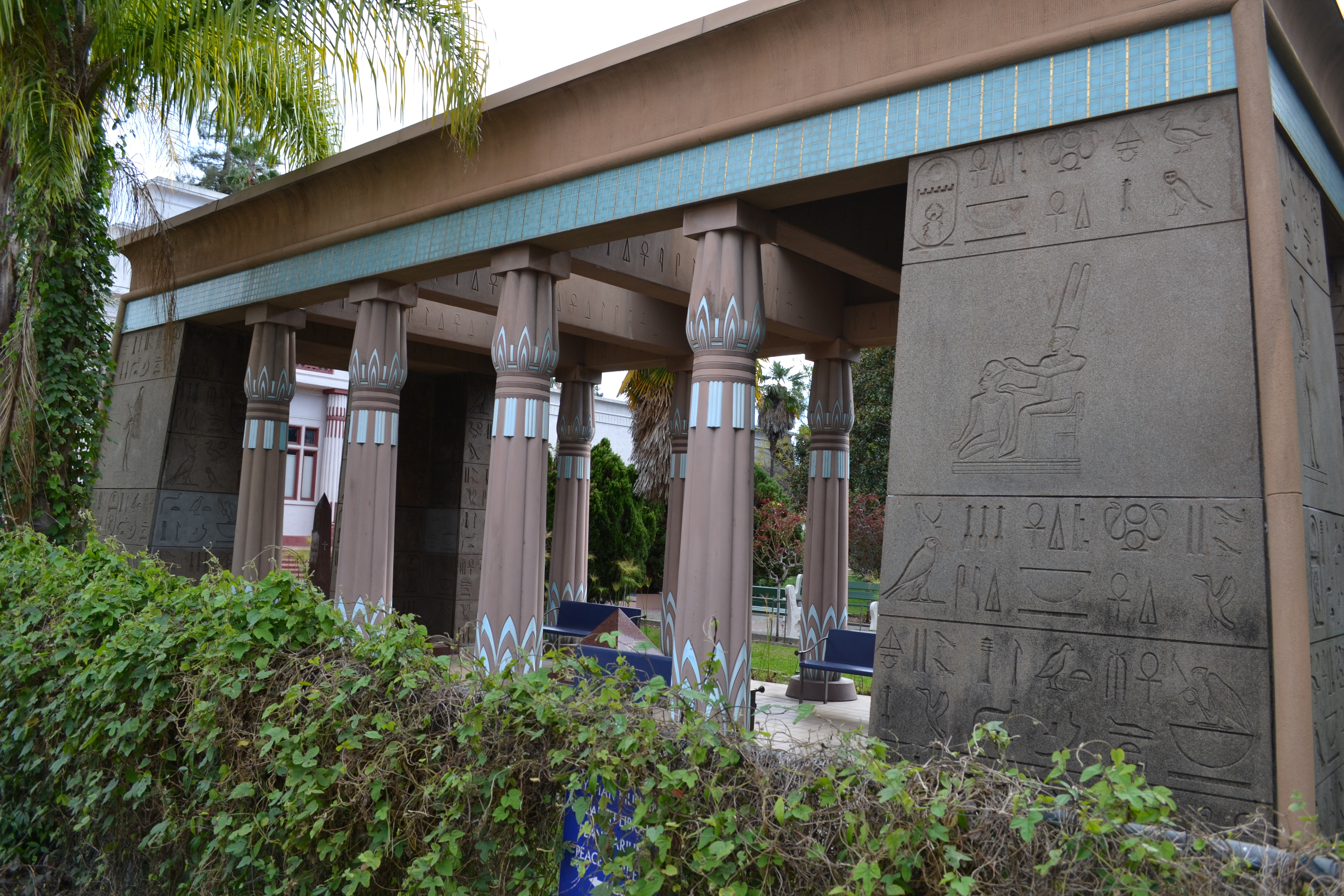
Rosicrucian Museum grounds

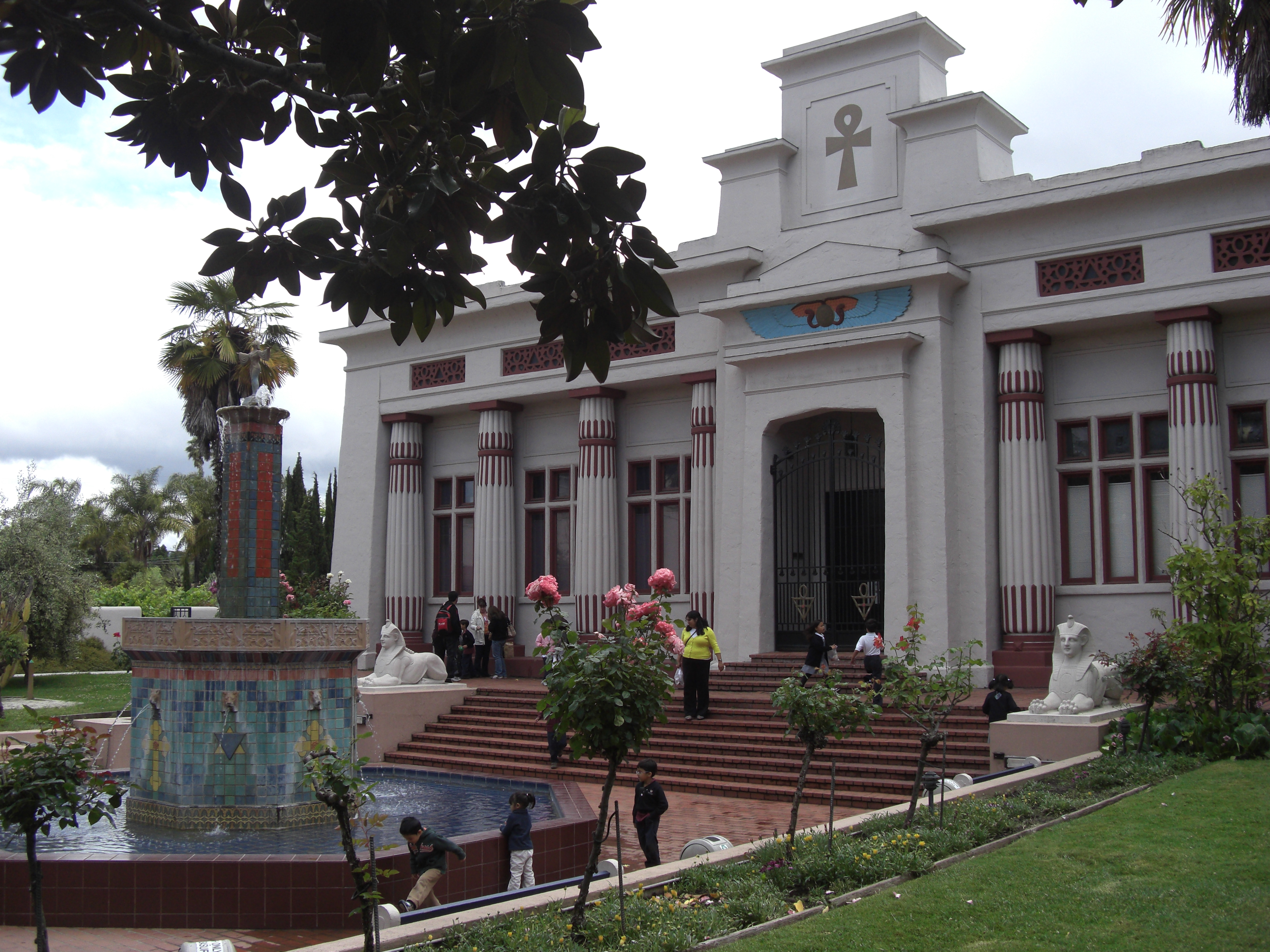
Rosicrucian Museum grounds

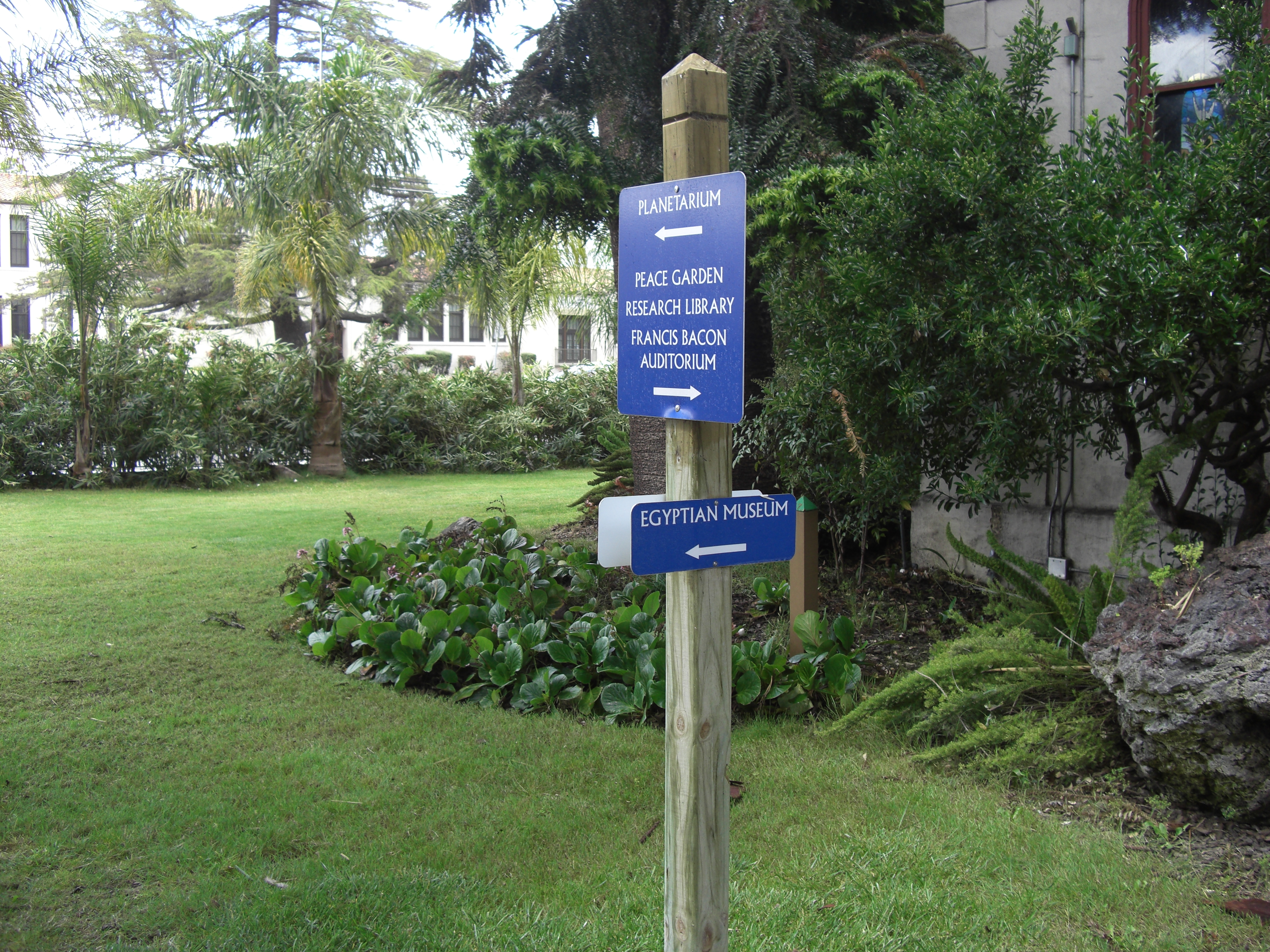
Rosicrucian Museum grounds

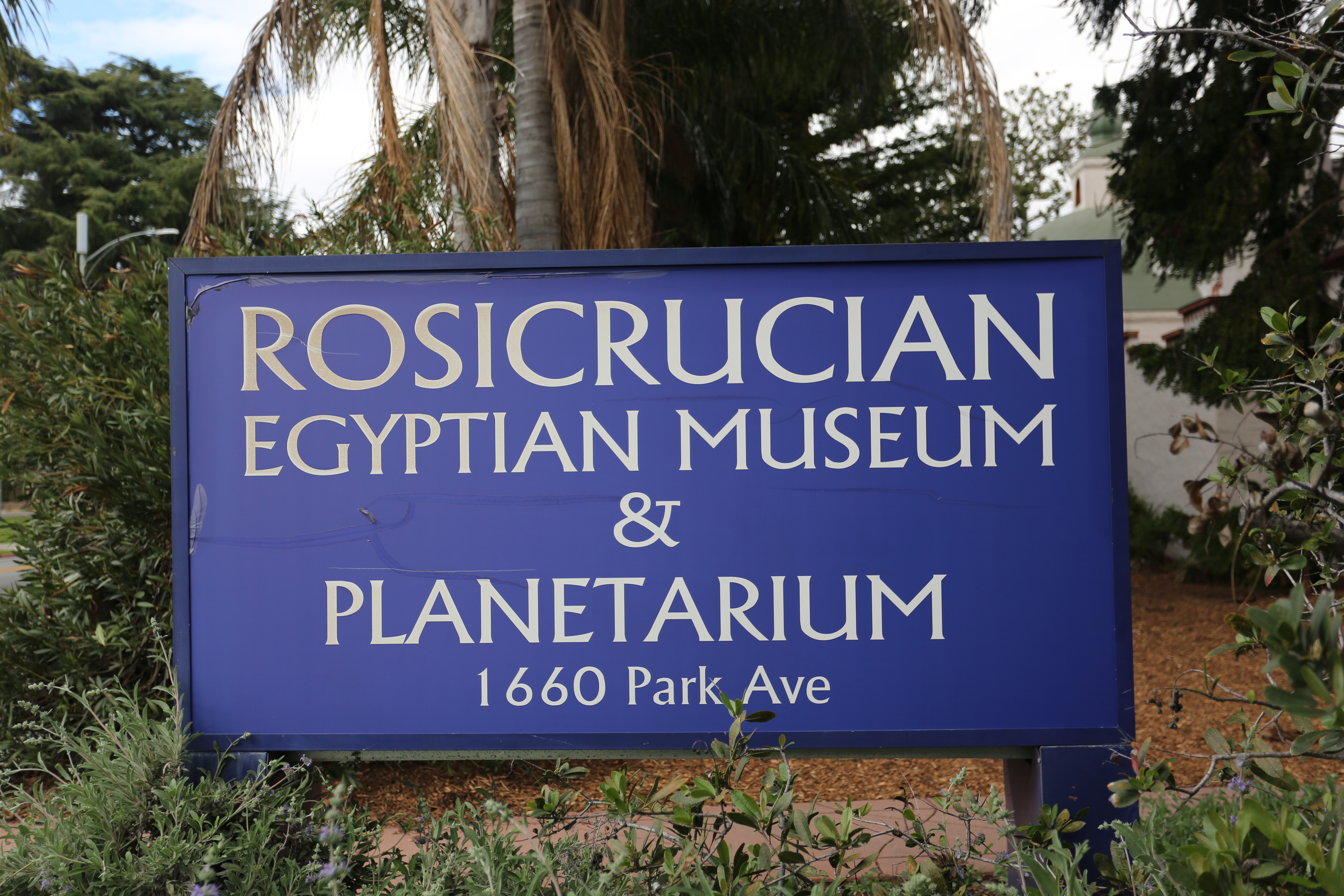
Rosicrucian Museum sign

In 2017, the museum was claiming 110,000 visitors per year, including 26,000 sixth-graders. The building is also used by the Rosicrucians for meditation and group discussions. In 2018, the museum became a zero-energy building.

== Notable exhibits ==
A notable activity took place in 1999 when the Rosicrucian Egyptian Museum started the traveling exhibition "Women of the Nile" accompanied by many lectures. "Women of the Nile" travelled across the United States of America and Canada, and continued until 2001. From 2000 to 2002, a stone figure from the collection of Cleopatra VII was displayed in Rome, London, and Chicago in similar exhibitions.

The Rosicrucian Egyptian Museum's child mummy traveled to Stanford University in nearby Palo Alto on May 6, 2005, to be studied under CT scans and other high-resolution methods of remote sensing, in a collaboration between the museum, Silicon Graphics, and Stanford University Hospital and the NASA Biocomputational Lab. The results were released at the 75th Anniversary of the Museum on August 6, 2005, with detailed scans. One of the scanning images won the Science and Engineering Visualization Challenge 2006 co-sponsored by the National Science Foundation and Science. In November 2017, x-ray images of the mummy were released that provide a 3D visualization of the girl's remains.

A statue of Taweret, the ancient Egyptian hippopotamus-like goddess of pregnant women and childbirth, once stood at the entrance, but has been moved to the side. Since 2004, the Museum has been completely renovated, with the following Gallery themes:

- Afterlife and Rock Cut Tomb
- Daily Life and Other Cultures
- Kingship and Palace
- Temple (Sekhmet) and Akhenaten's Amarna period
- Rotating Exhibits: Since 2015: The Rosicrucian Alchemy Exhibit
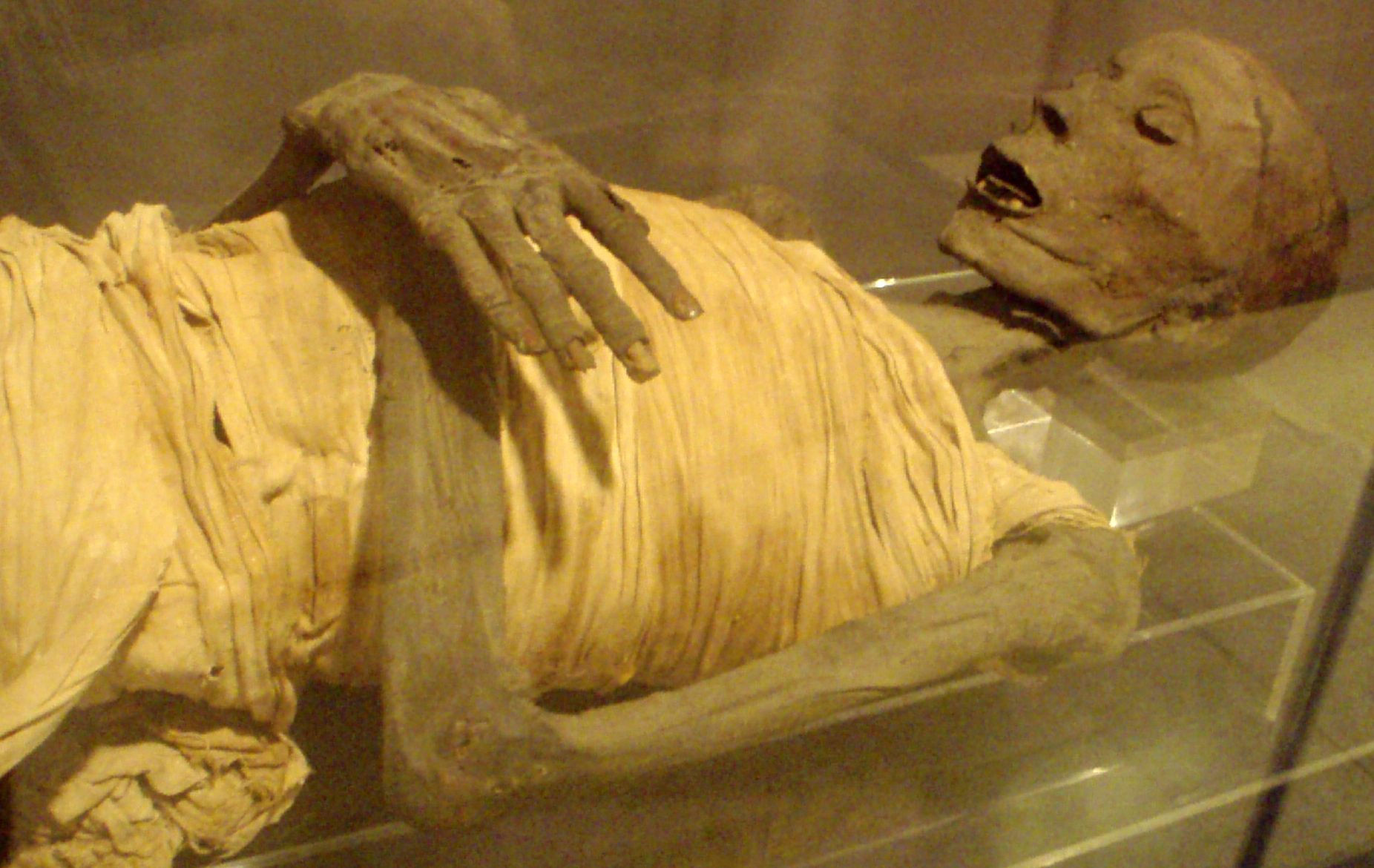
An upper-class Egyptian male, often referred as "Usermontu"

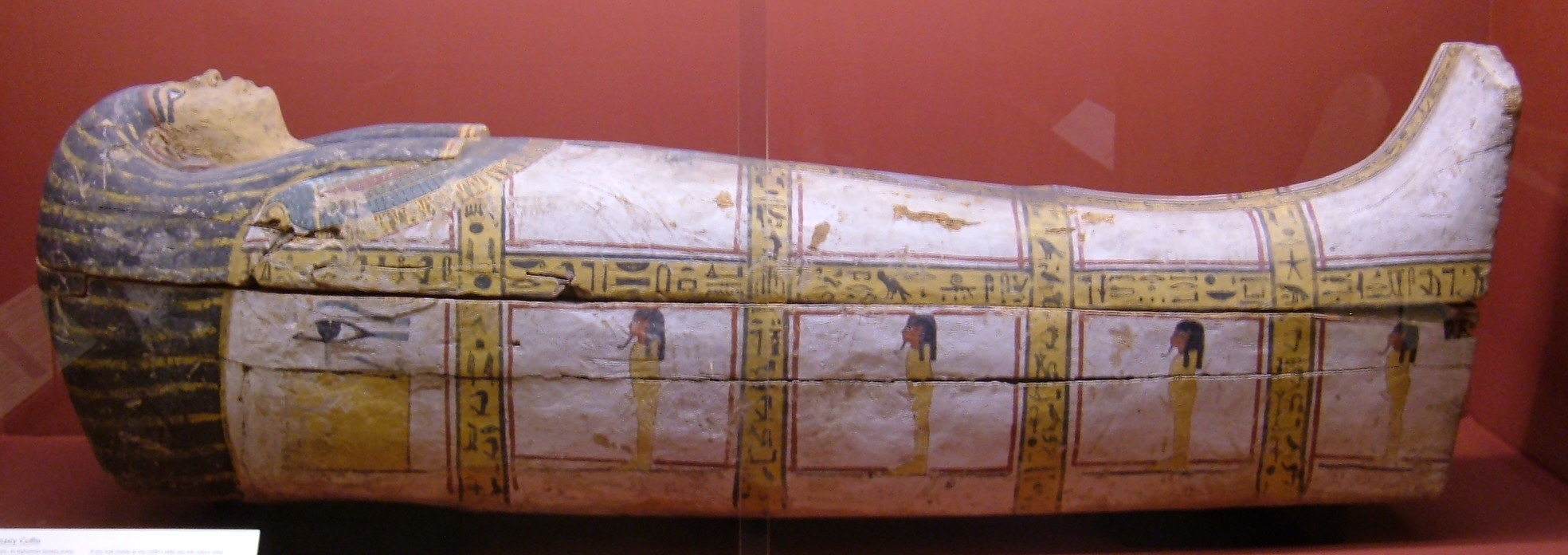
Early 18th dynasty coffin

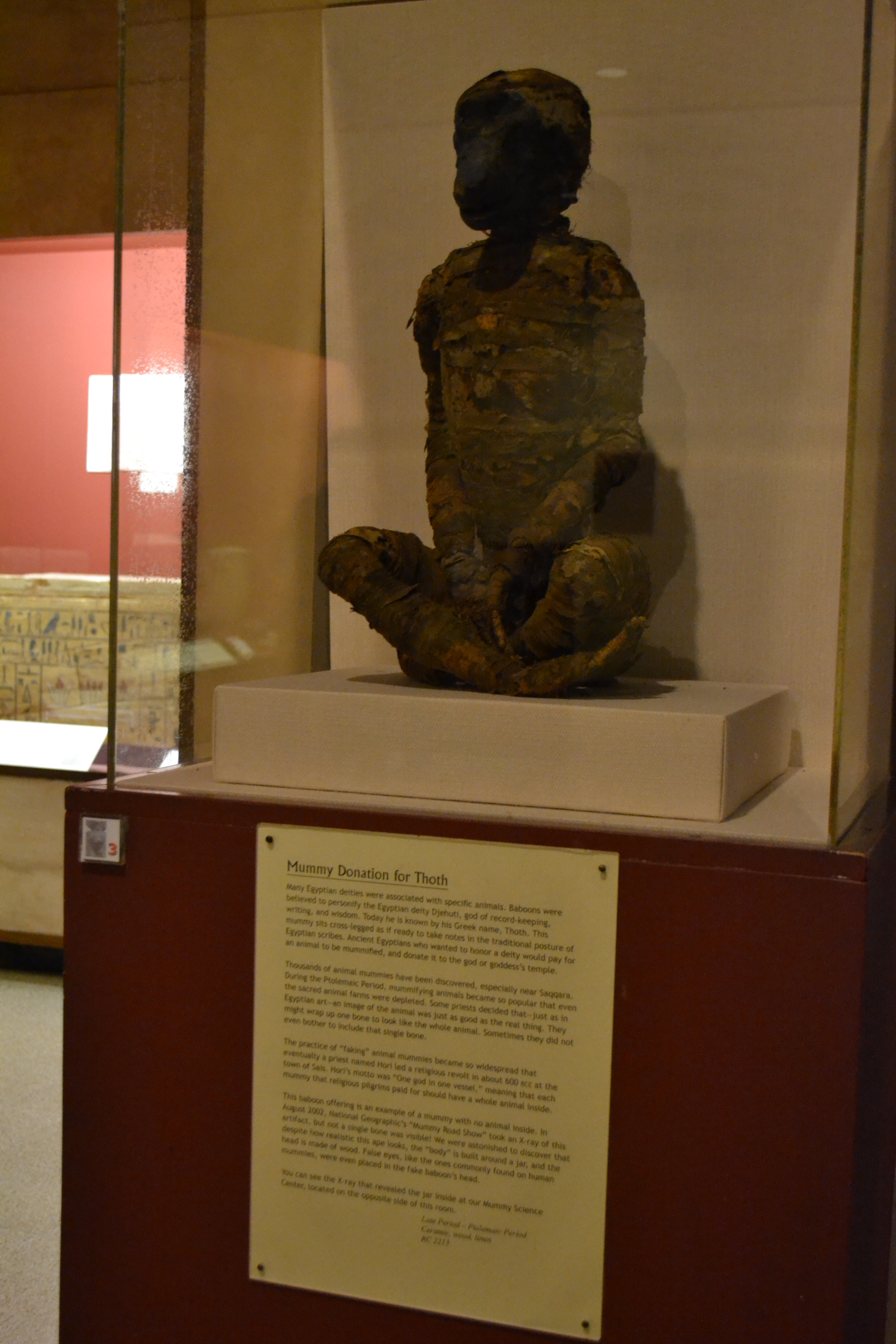
Baboon mummy. There is in fact no baboon inside; the mummy is formed around a ceramic jar.

The museum also holds a 1.5 million-year-old stone hand ax, but it is not exhibited to the public.

=== Rock-cut tomb replica ===
The Rosicrucian Egyptian Museum contains a composite replica of an ancient Egyptian rock-cut tomb, based on photos and sketches taken by Rosicrucian expeditions to tombs at Beni Hasan, to give guests the experience of being in such an excavation. Below are photographs of the interior of the replica tomb, largely containing scenes from the Book of the Dead. The dark interior of the tomb replica is evident.

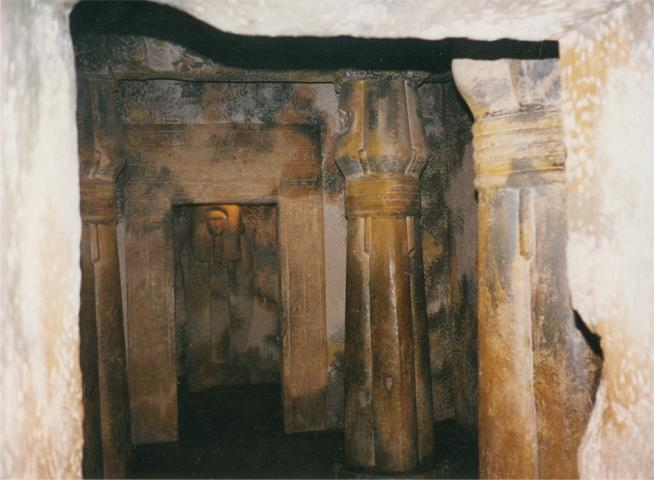

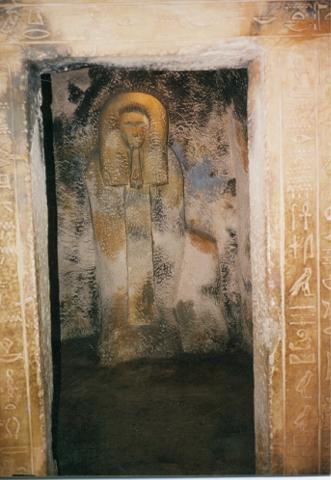

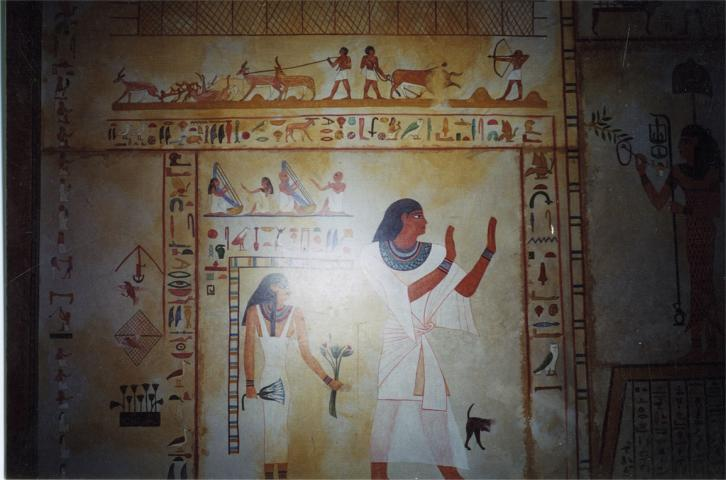

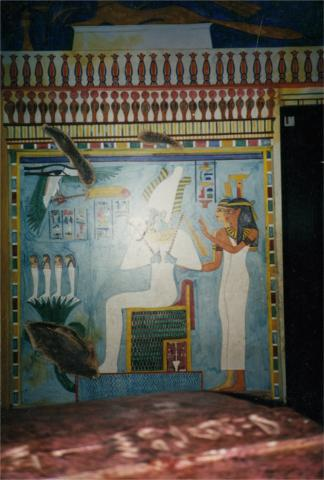

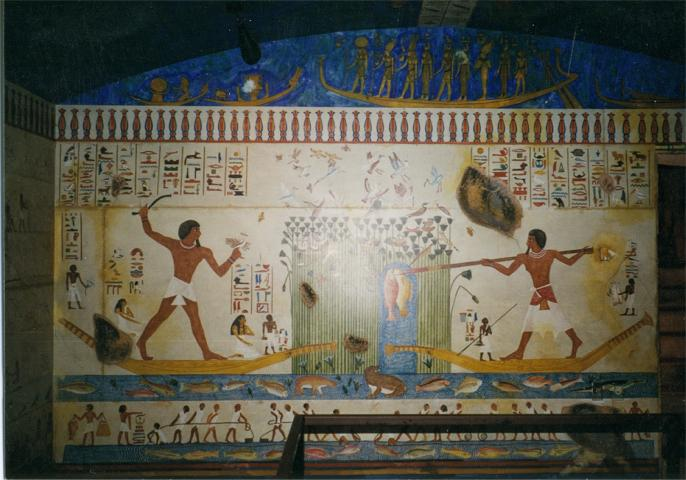

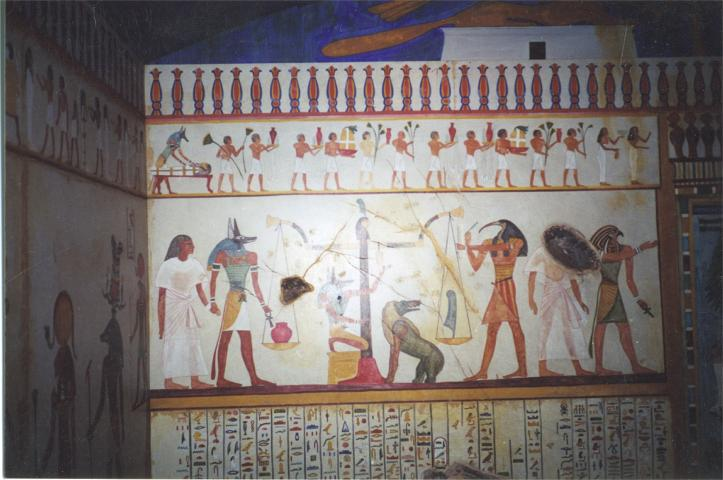

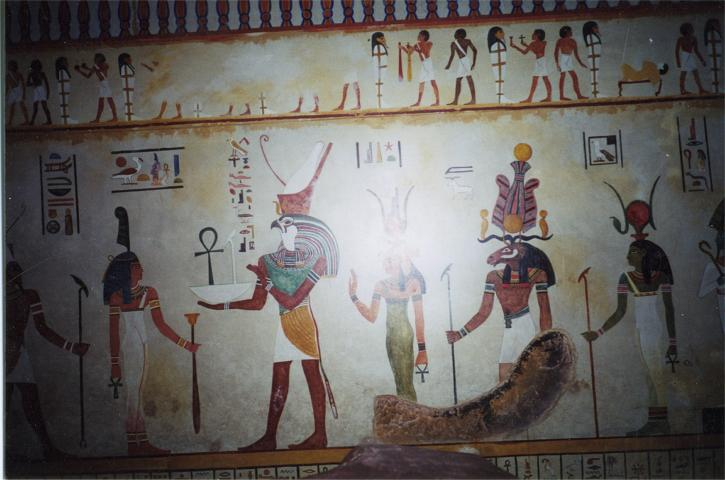

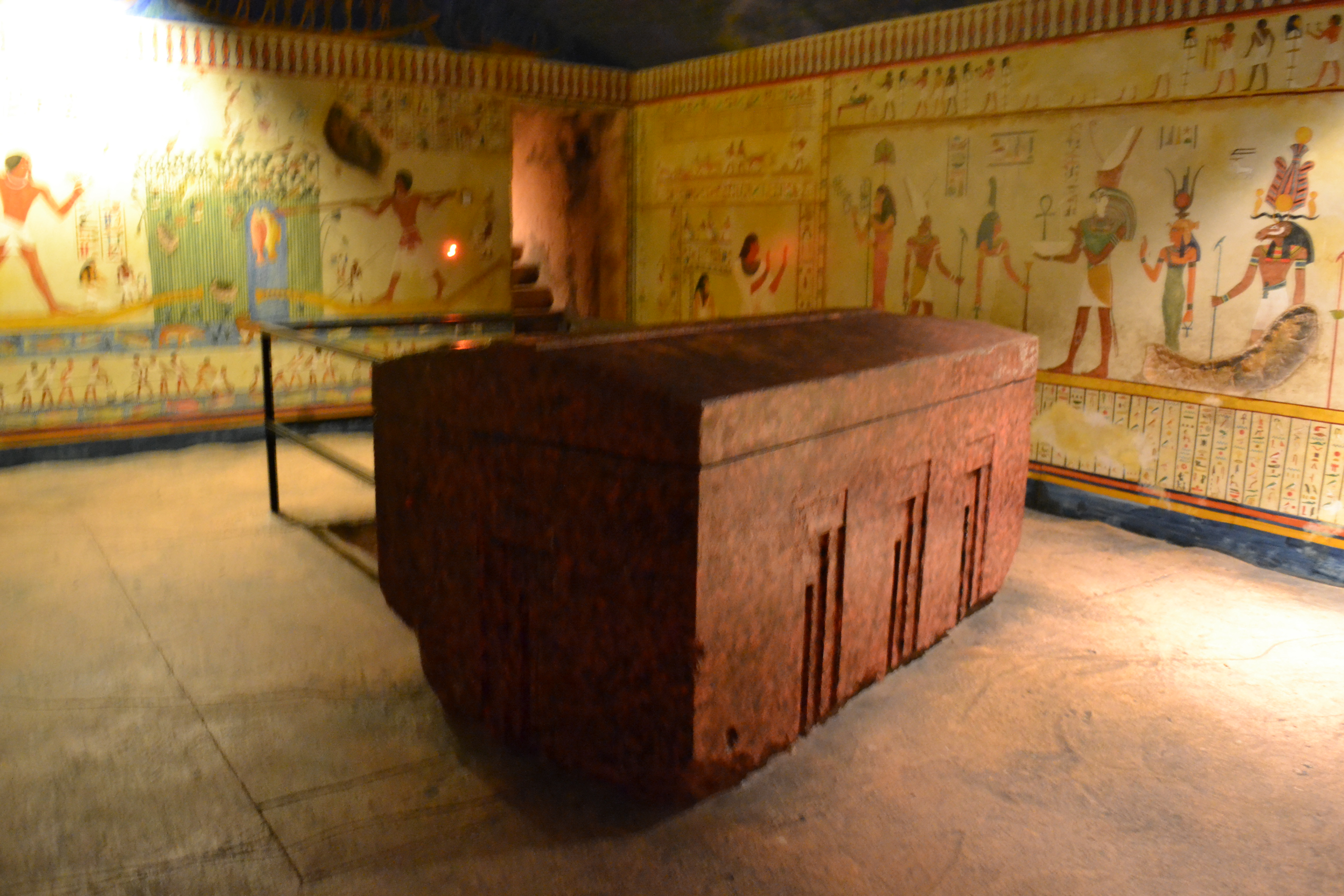

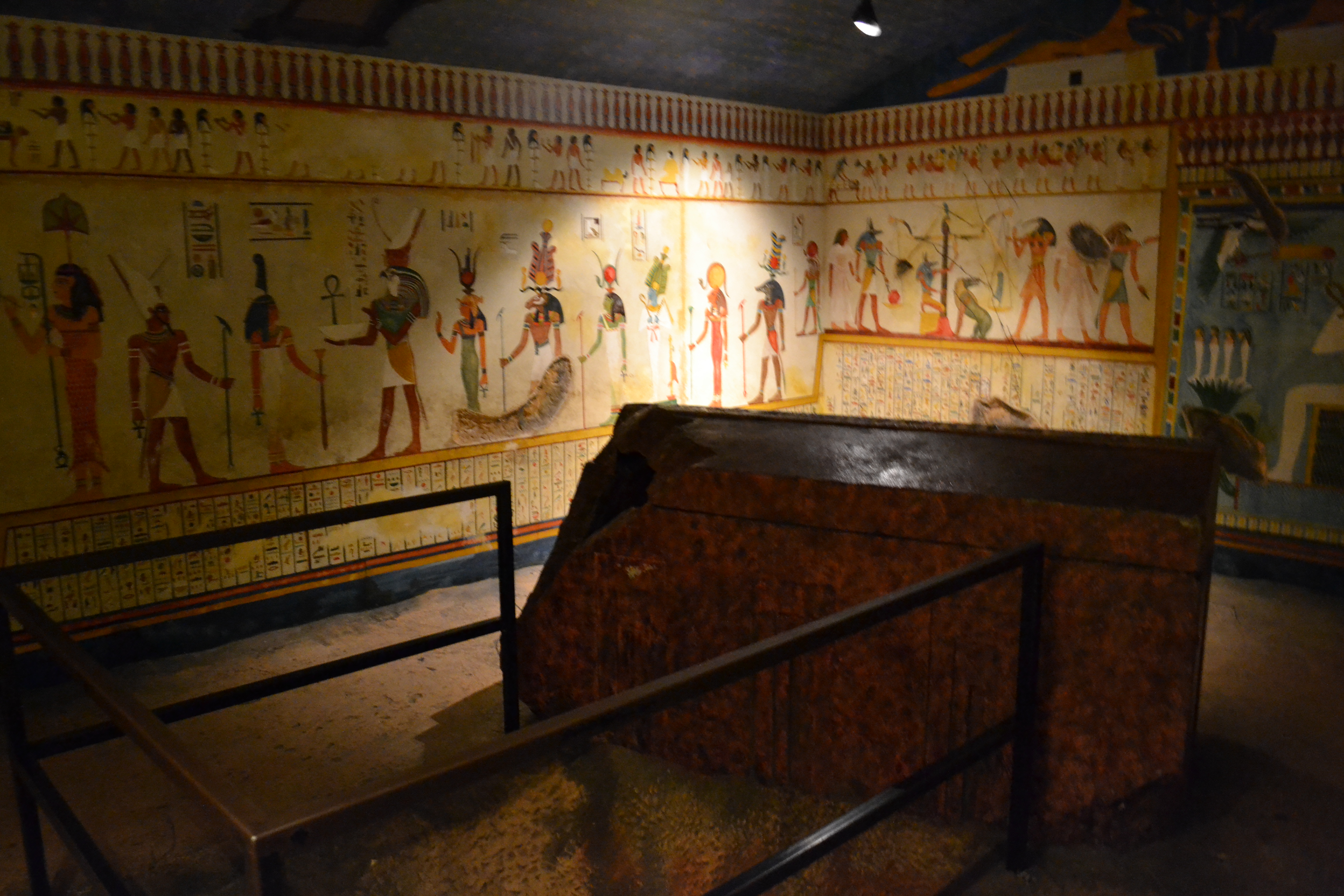

=== The Rosicrucian Alchemy Exhibit ===
Beginning in 2015, for the 100th Anniversary of the incorporation of AMORC in America, which owns and operates the Museum, the museum's Rotating Exhibits Gallery became The Rosicrucian Alchemy Exhibit, curated by Dennis William Hauck. The exhibit features the seven stages of the alchemical process, a meditation chamber featuring the Azoth of the Philosophers, and a reproduction of the Ripley Scroll with illustrative commentary.

AMORC plans to expand the Alchemy exhibit into what would be the first alchemy museum in the United States. It will be housed in the present "Rose-Croix University International" building at Rosicrucian Park.

On June 22, 2024, the museum released the Thoth AI to the public, a chatbot modeled after the ancient Egyptian god Thoth.

== See also ==
- List of museums of Egyptian antiquities
