= Fleischmann Planetarium & Science Center =

Coordinates: 39.546111°N 119.818611°W

- Fleischmann Atmospherium Planetarium
- U.S. National Register of Historic Places
- Nevada Historic Landmark
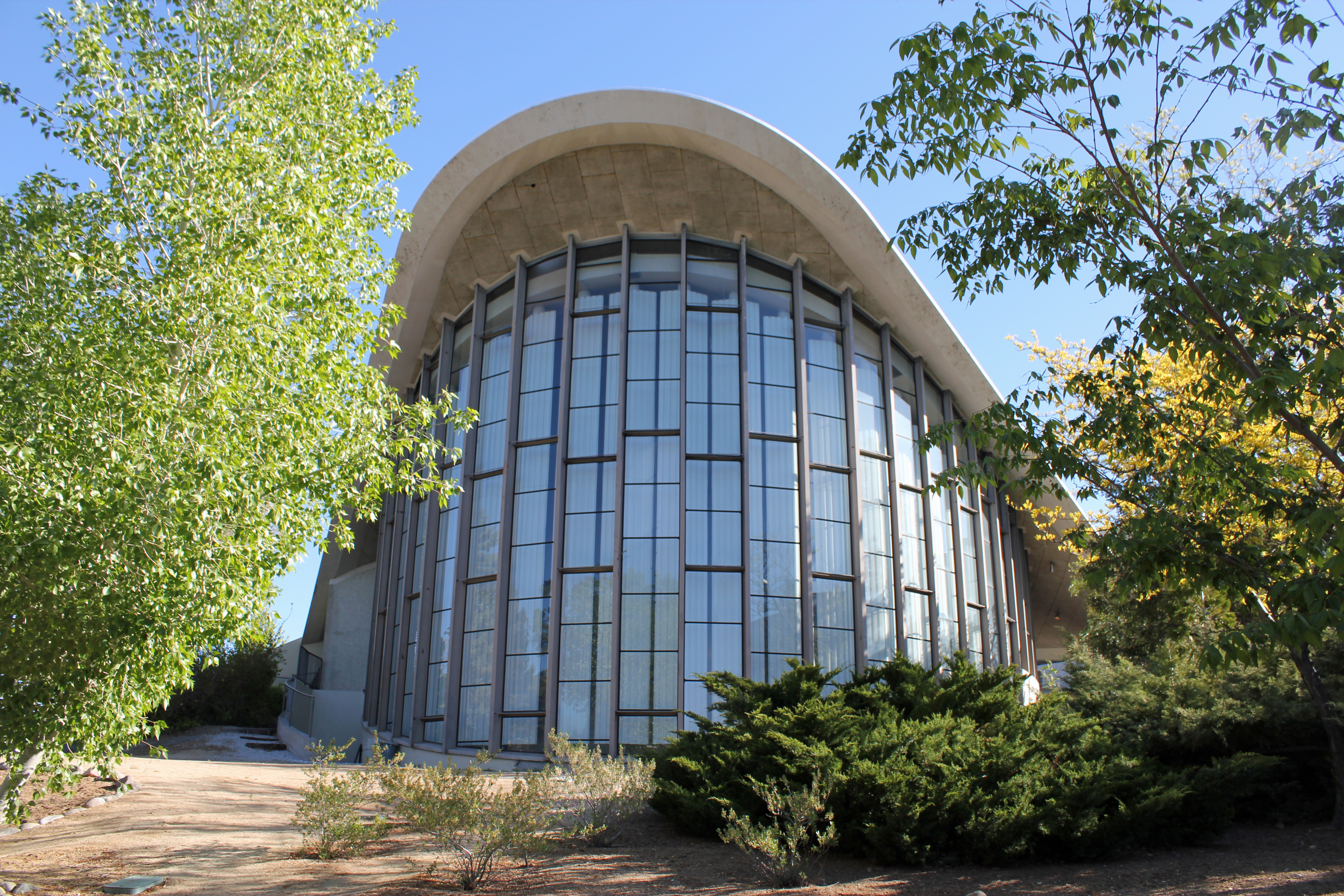

- Location within Nevada Location within the United States
- Location: Reno, Nevada, U.S.
- Built: 1963; 63 years ago
- Architect: Raymond M. Hellmann
- NRHP reference No.: 94001148
- Added to NRHP: September 22, 1994

The Fleischmann Atmospherium Planetarium was built in 1963 on the University of Nevada, Reno campus. It was the first planetarium in the United States to feature a 360-degree projector capable of providing horizon-to-horizon images and through time-lapse photography showing an entire day's weather in a few minutes.

Currently it offers public star shows.

The planetarium's uniquely shaped building, a hyperbolic paraboloid, was designed by famed Reno architect Raymond M. Hellmann and is listed on the National Register of Historic Places.
