= Rosicrucian Park =

Park and Rosicrucian headquarters in San Jose, California

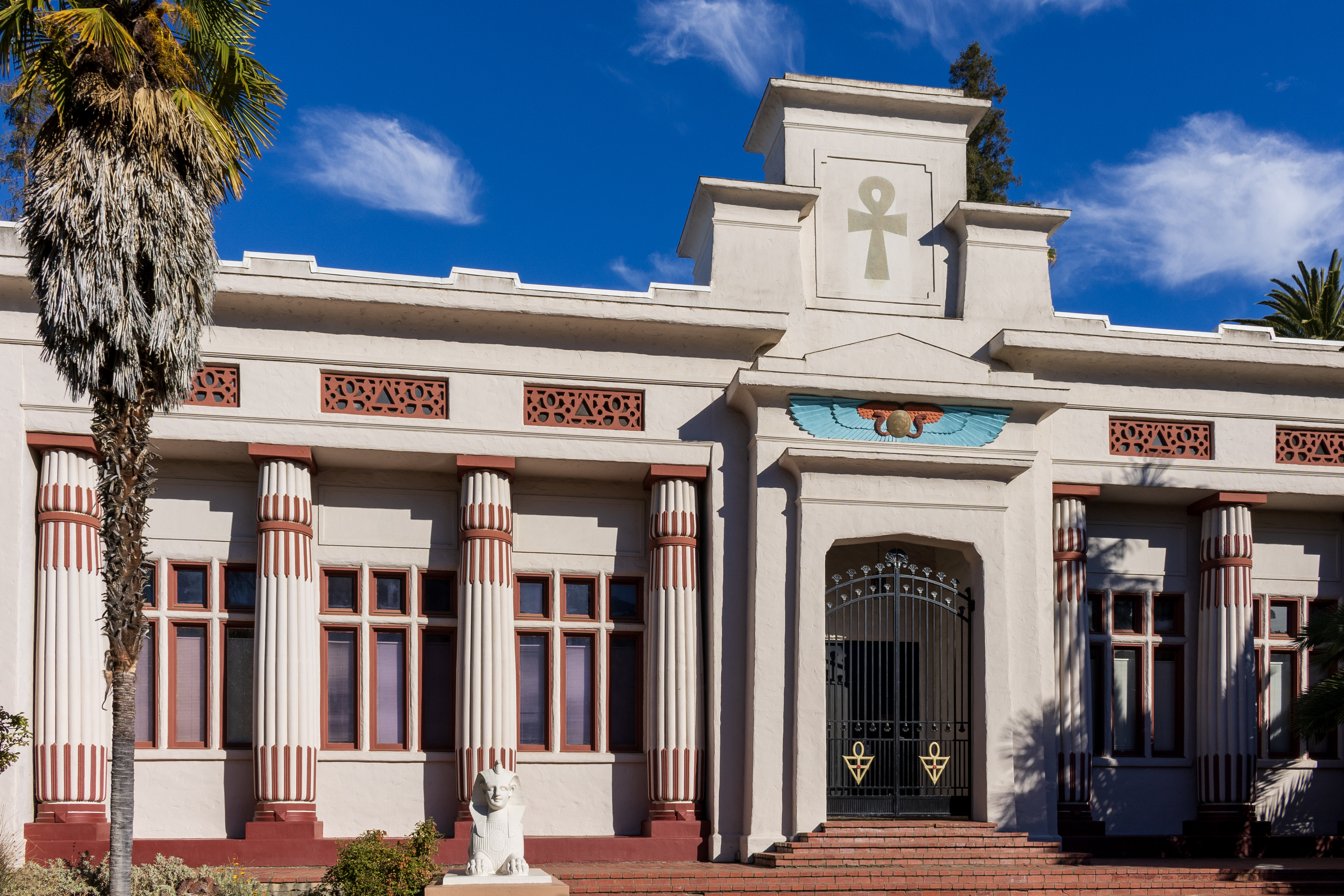
- Rosicrucian University building in the Park
- Interactive map of Rosicrucian Park
- Location: 1660 Park Ave, San Jose, California
- Coordinates: 37°20′02″N 121°55′23″W
- Created: 1927
- Operator: Ancient Mystical Order Rosae Crucis
- Website: www.rosicrucianpark.org

Rosicrucian Park is the headquarters of the English Grand Lodge for the Americas of the Ancient Mystical Order Rosae Crucis, located in San Jose, California.

== History ==
The Rosicrucian Park was established in 1927 by Harvey Spencer Lewis. It grew from one single lot to a 5-acre city block. The Rosicrucian Egyptian Museum was built in 1932, the Planetarium in 1936, the research library opened in June 1939. The Akhenaton Shrine was built in 1949.

The Peace Garden was added to the park in 2004 and dedicated by Rosicrucian Imperator Christian Bernard. In 2013, a new Alchemy Museum was announced for 2020. The opening ceremony for the preliminary exhibit in the Lecture Gallery of the Rosicrucian Egyptian Museum occurred during the Summer solstice of June 2015. The new museum in the former Rose-Croix University International building will include a working alchemy laboratory. The Alchemy garden in front of the new museum is composed of four elemental gardens representing the four elements.

From 2009 to 2015, the Park reduced its water consumption by 4.5 million gallons.

== Description ==
The park takes up nearly an entire city block and includes the Rosicrucian Egyptian Museum, the administration building for the Order, the Rosicrucian Planetarium, the Rosicrucian Peace Garden, the Rosicrucian Research Library, the Grand Temple, and a central fountain plaza and gardens. A rose garden is incorporated in the Park next to the Research Library. A dawn redwood grows outside of the Rosicrucian Research Library as a memorial to H. Spencer Lewis. It was planted in 1950 from a seedling from the lot brought from China by Dr. Ralph Chaney, and donated by an unnamed donor to H. Spencer Lewis's widow for this purpose.

The park also includes the Akhenaten Shrine (named for the 18th dynasty Pharaoh Akhenaten), which contains the ashes of AMORC founder Harvey Spencer Lewis and other former officials of the order.

With the exception of the planetarium, all buildings in Rosicrucian Park were constructed with exteriors inspired by the Ancient Egyptian architectural tradition. In tribute to their claimed Egyptian heritage, cyperus papyrus plants are also incorporated into the landscaping.

== Gallery ==
Photographs of various buildings and statuary within the block comprising Rosicrucian Park.

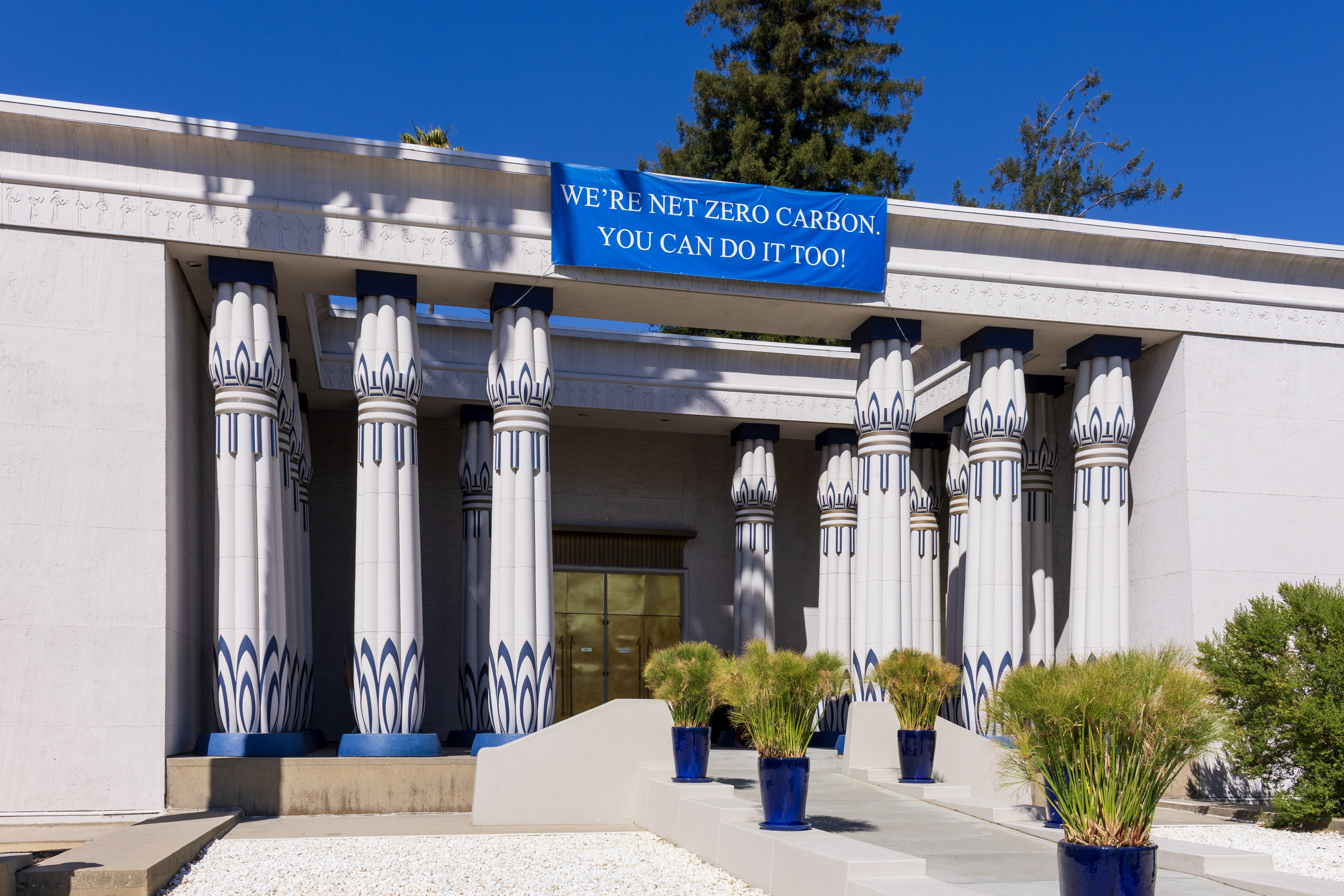
Entrance to Rosicrucian Egyptian Museum

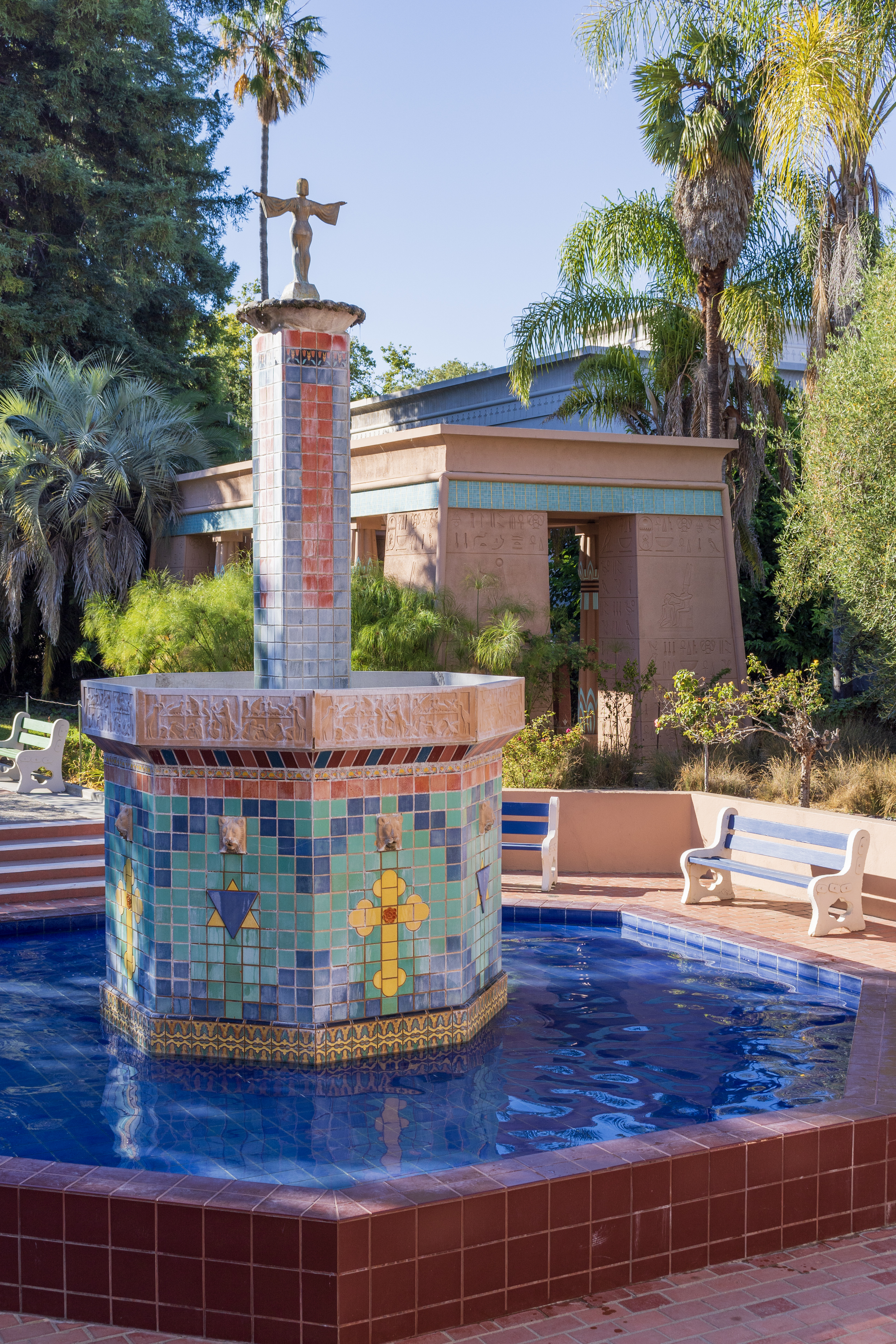
Water feature

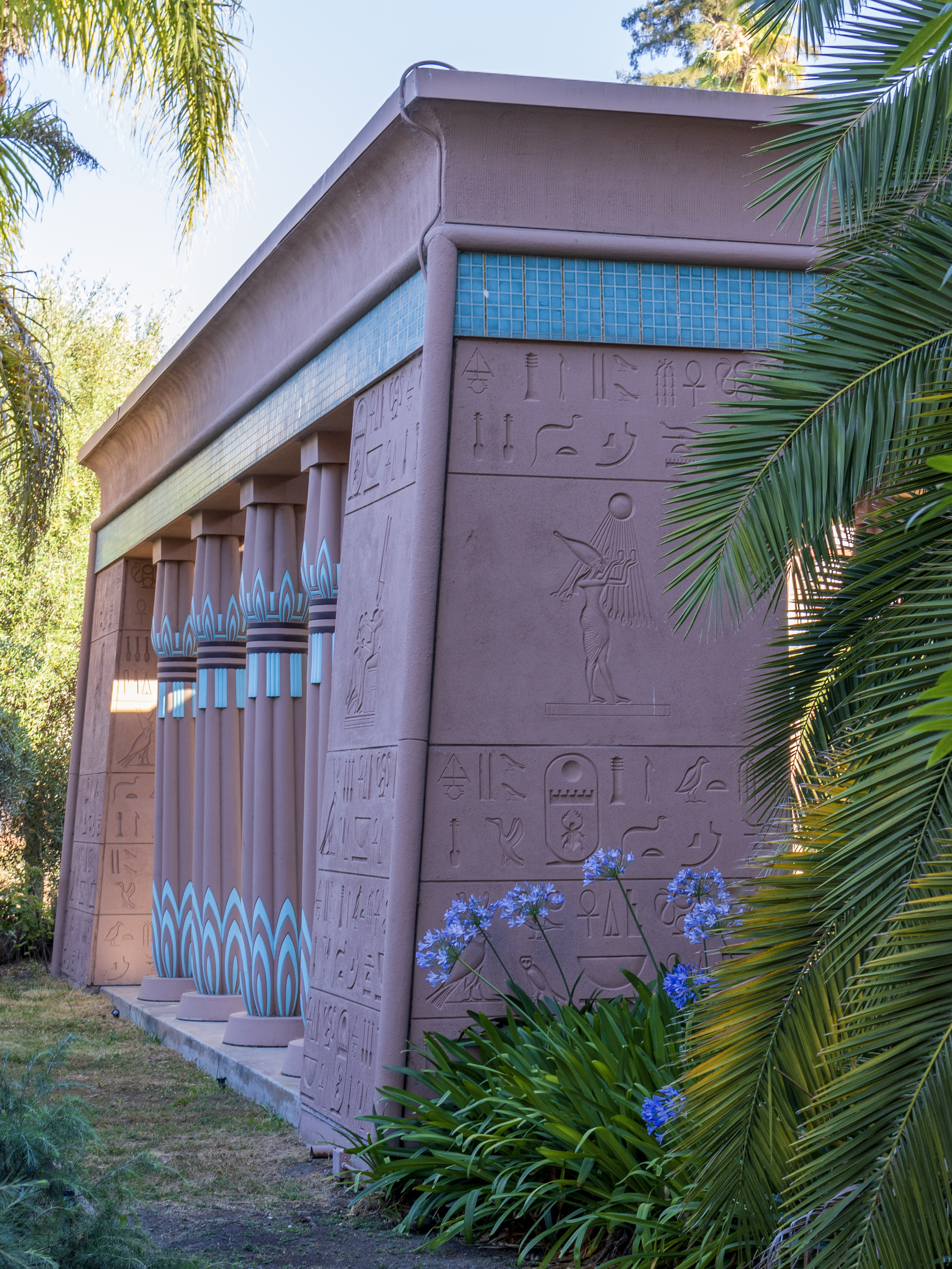
Akhenaten Shrine

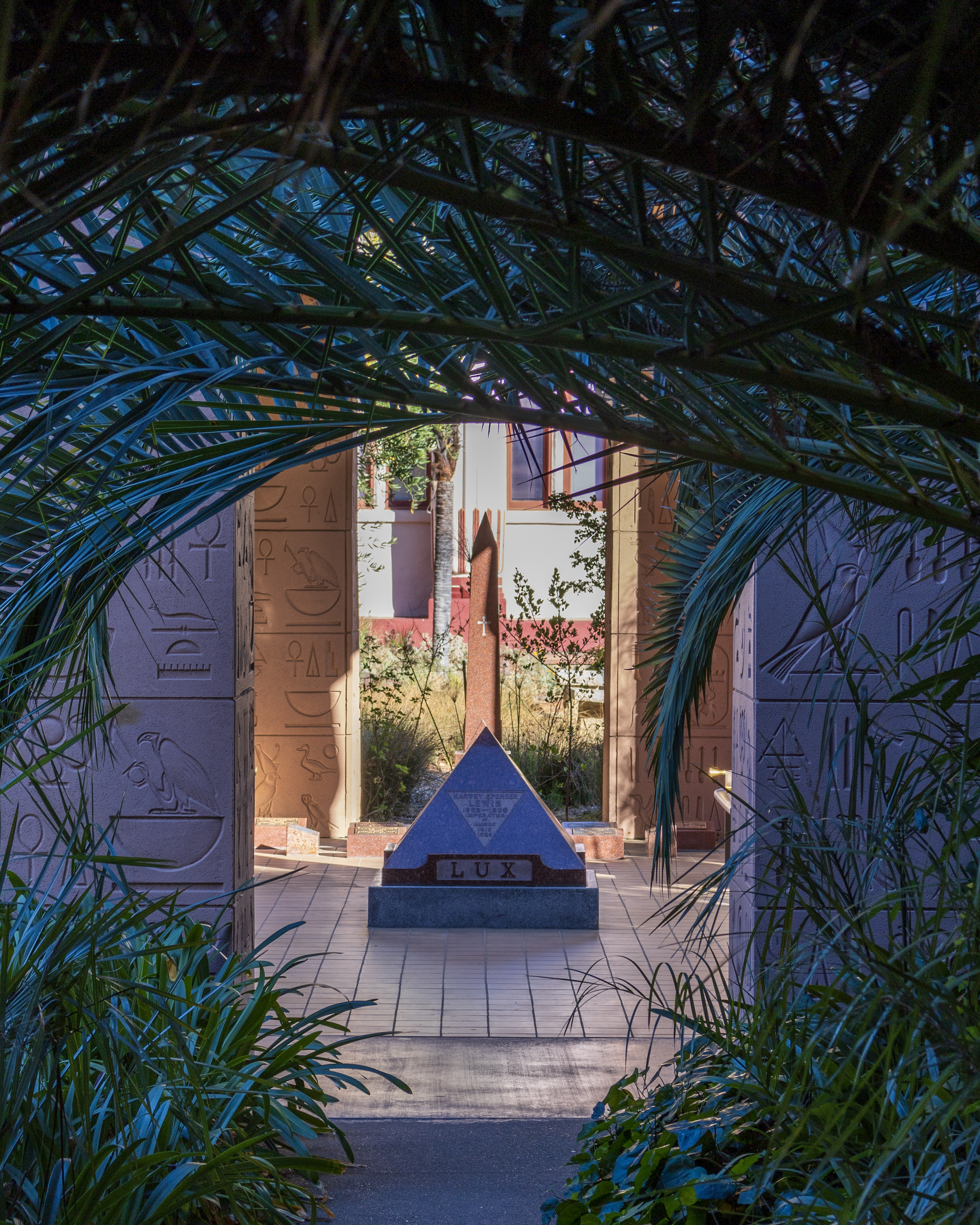
Gravestone of Harvey Spencer Lewis

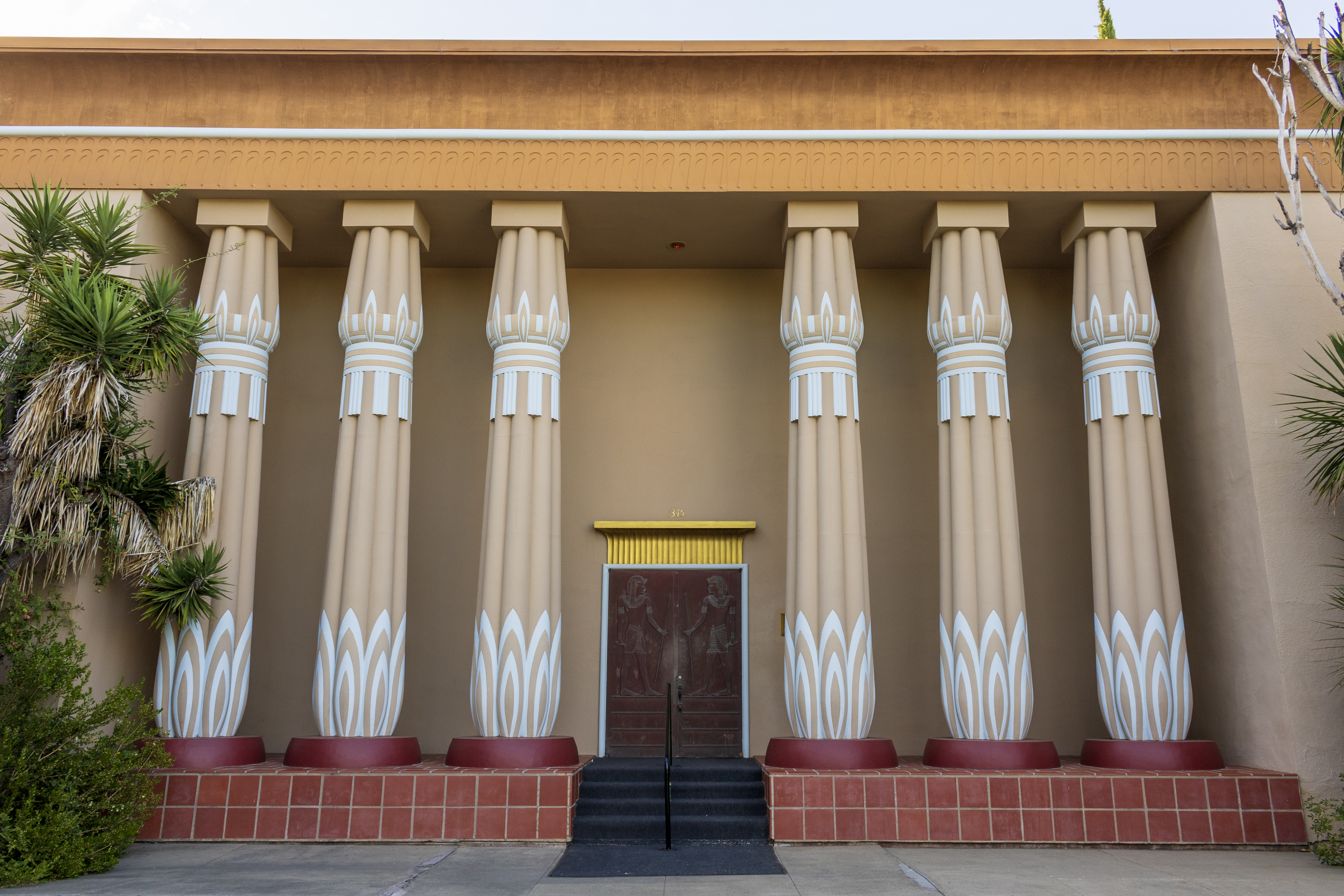
Grand Temple

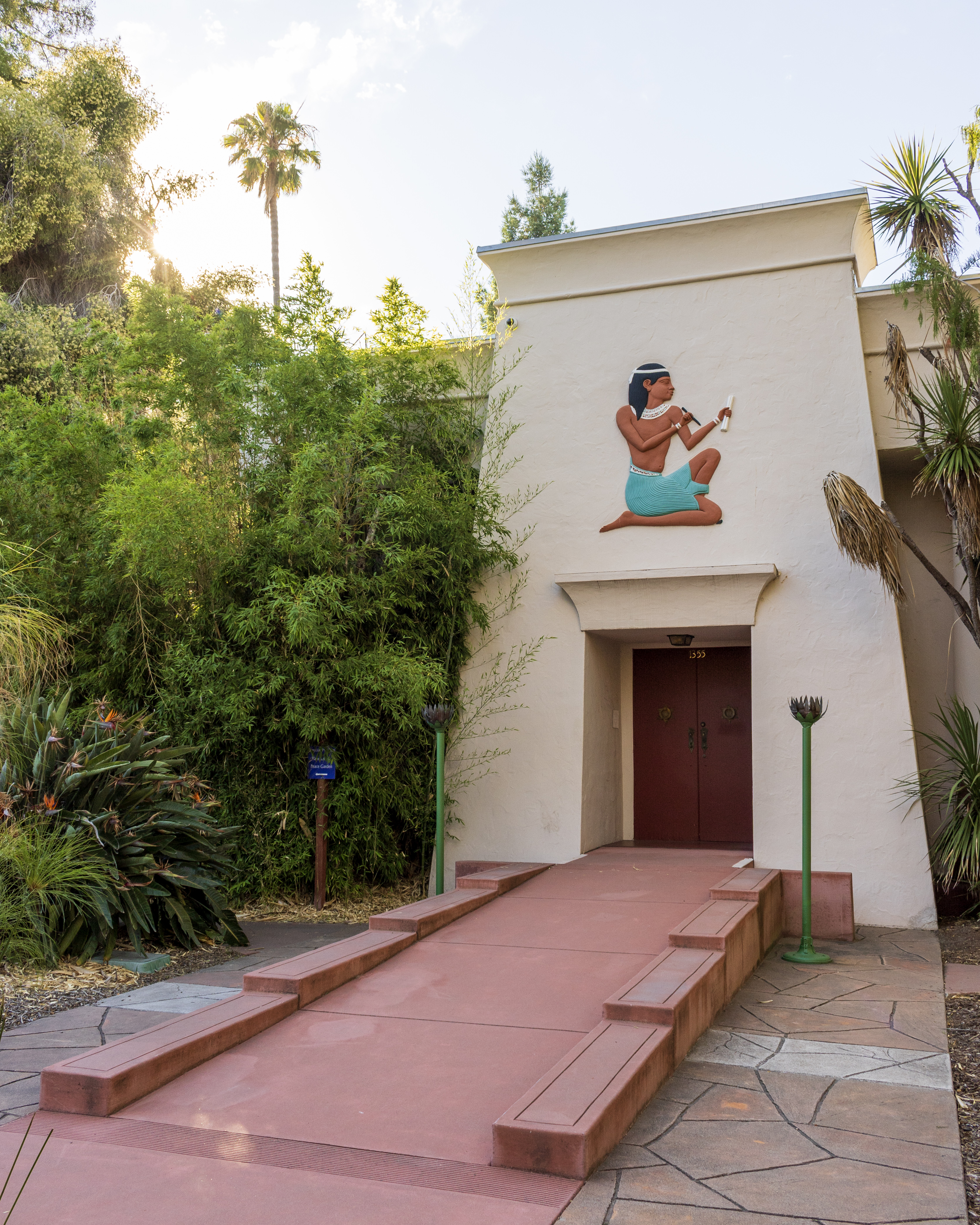
Research Library

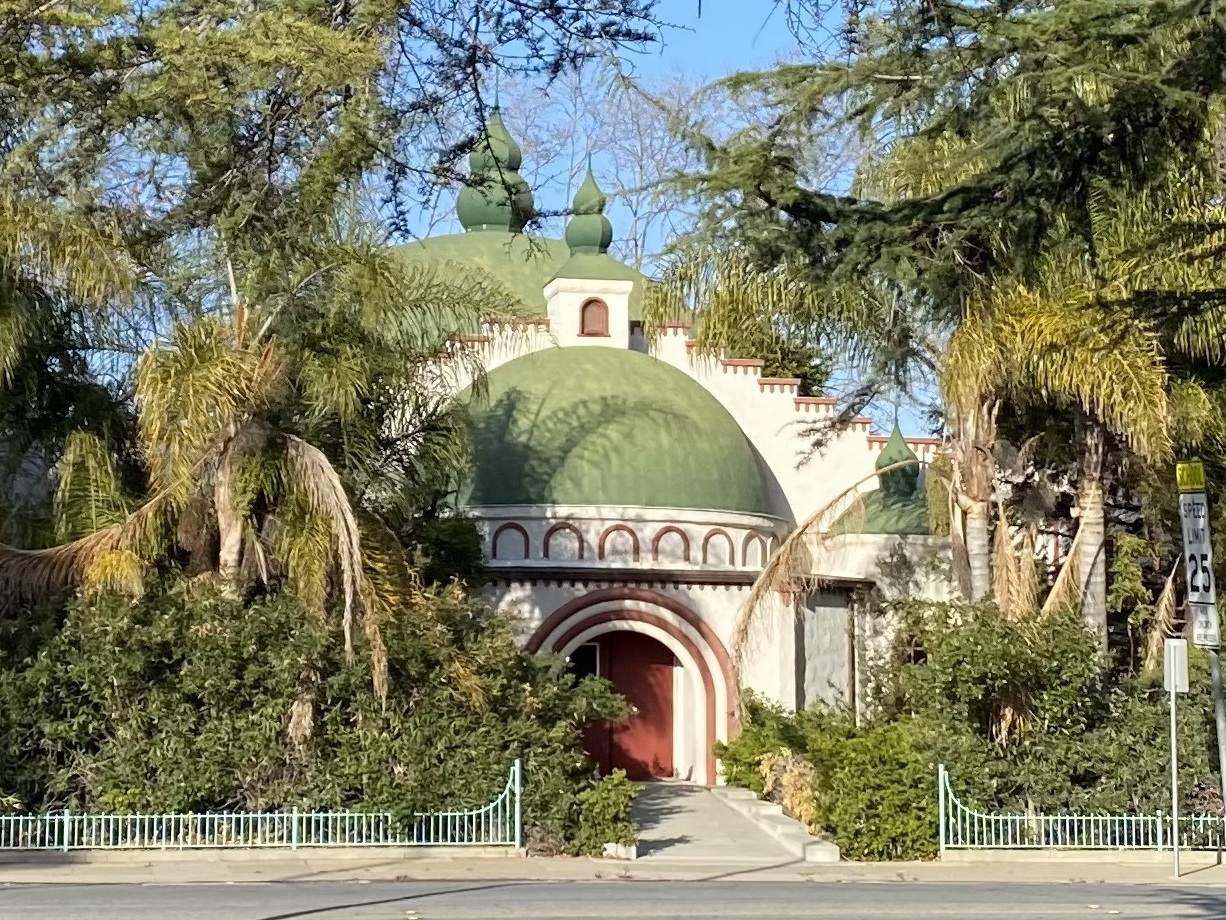
Planetarirum

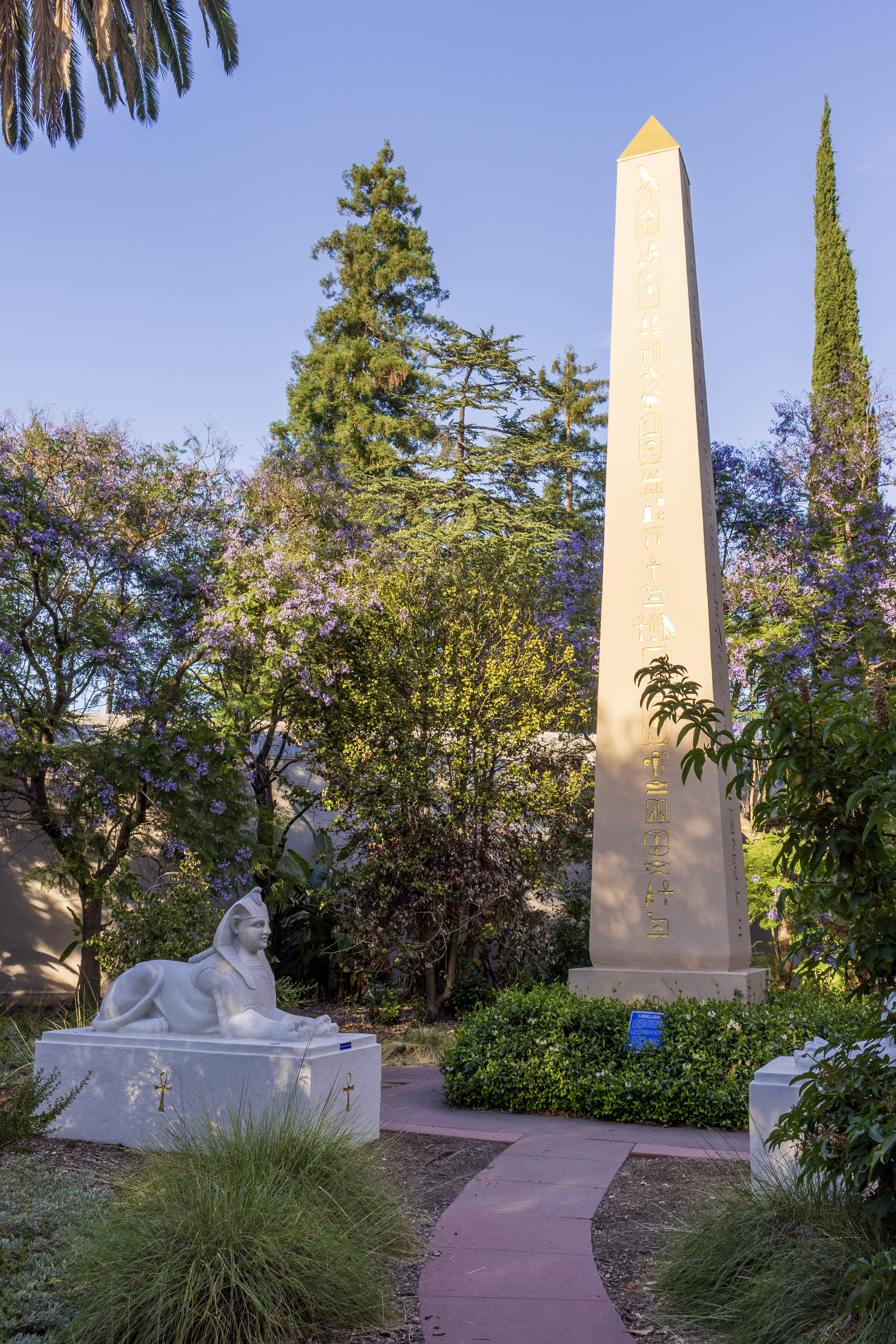
Obelisk, replica of one from Heliopolis, Egypt

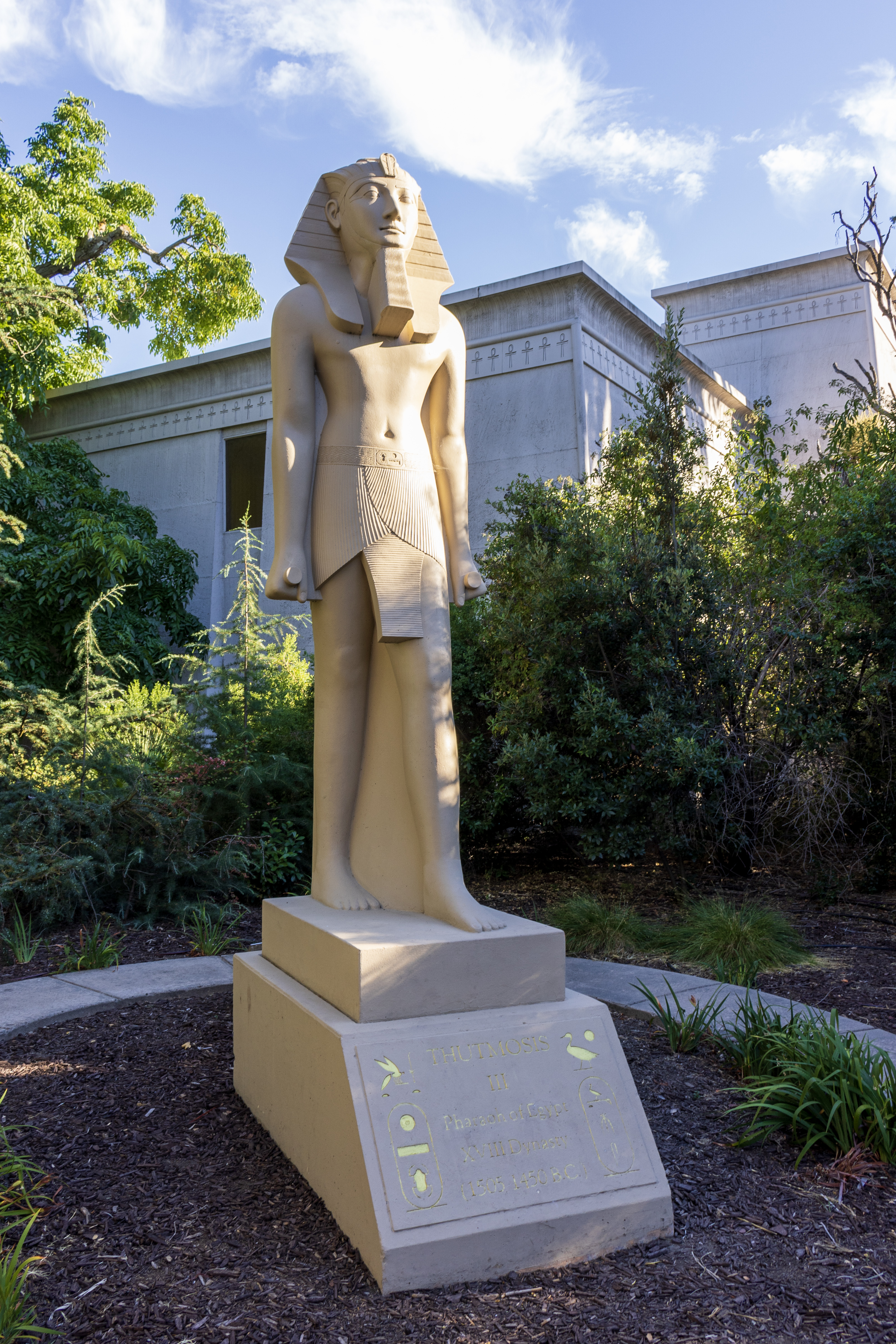
Statue of Thutmosis III
