= Usermontu (mummy) =

Remains of an ancient Egyptian man

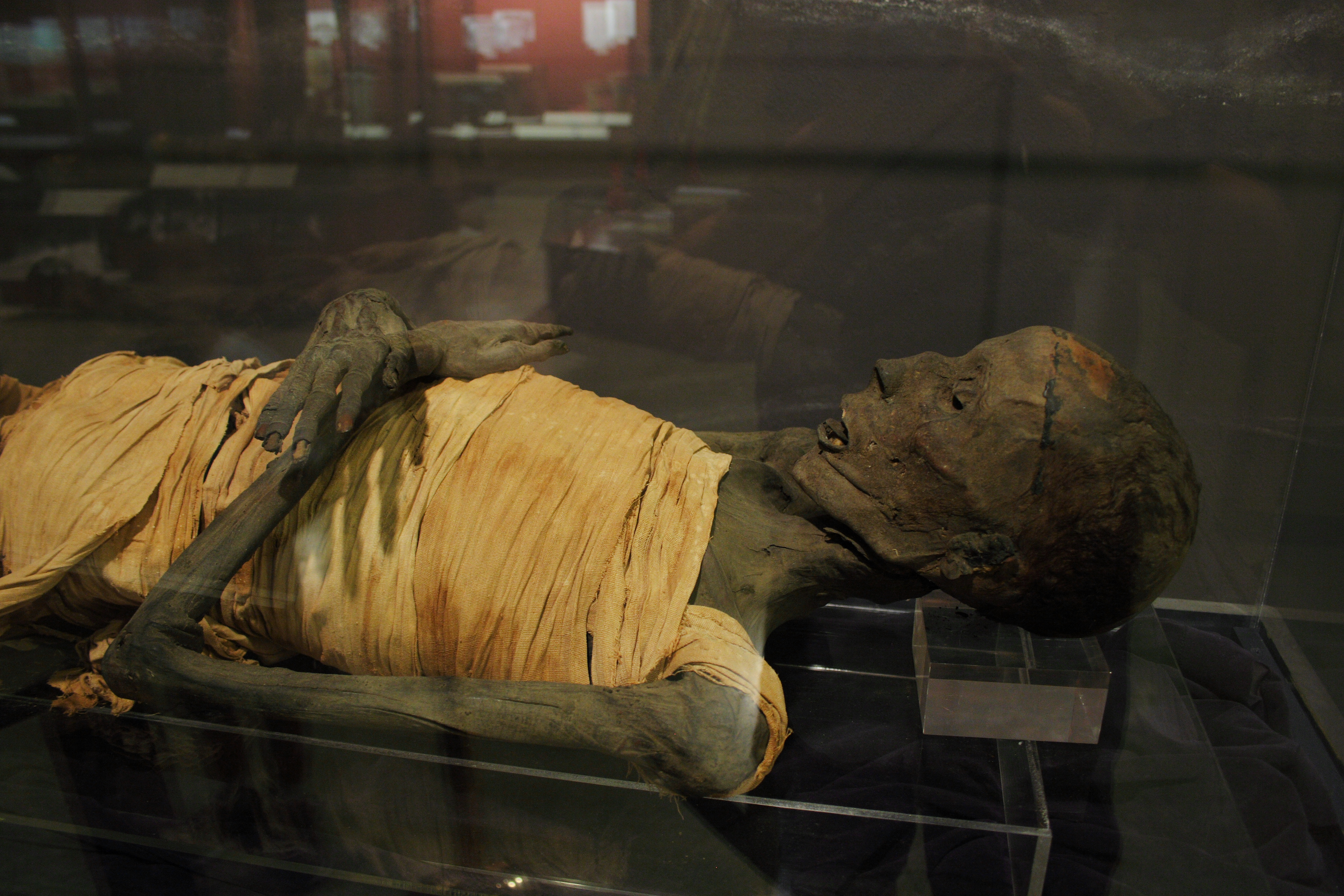
Side view of the mummy

Usermontu is an ancient Egyptian mummy exhibited at the Rosicrucian Egyptian Museum in San Jose, California.

The name Usermontu—which means "Powerful is Montu"—almost certainly is not the name of the mummified man. The mistake arose when long after death the mummy was placed in a coffin originally belonging to another man, a priest named Usermontu, and was still inside of it at the time of the coffin's rediscovery.

The mummy is very well-preserved, and is also known for having an ancient but sophisticated prosthetic pin in its left knee, which was used to reattach its leg post-mortem.

== History ==
In 1971, the Rosicrucian Museum acquired two sealed ancient Egyptian coffins from Neiman-Marcus. Unbeknownst to all, one of the coffins still contained the mummy, which was discovered soon after the purchase. On the basis of the embalming type used to preserve “Usermontu”, it is believed that he was an upper-class Egyptian male who likely lived during the New Kingdom of Egypt (between 16th–11th century BCE). For a reason that remains unknown, several centuries after death his corpse was put inside the coffin of the actual Usermontu, who lived during the 26th Dynasty. Some time around 400 BCE, as suggested by radiocarbon dating, the body underwent another wrapping with linen bandages which are still visible today.

There is no clue of where the coffin and the mummy originally came from. In life the man would have been a natural redhead, and his mummy is about 5 ft (1.5 m) tall.

=== Prosthetic pin ===
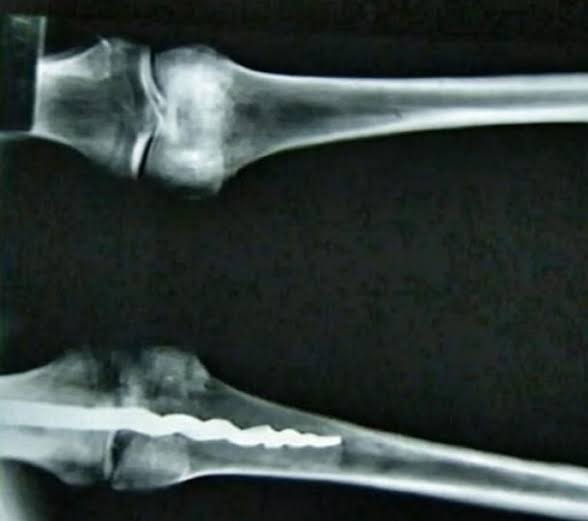
The screw found in the left knee of the mummy

In August 1995, BYU professor C. Wilfred Griggs performed some X-ray scans on the Rosicrucian mummies and discovered the presence of a 9 in (23 cm) iron-made orthopedic screw inside “Usermontu”'s left knee. Griggs initially believed that the pin was inserted in modern times in order to reattach the leg to the rest of the body, so he later obtained permission to unwrap the leg and directly examine the pin in order to solve the mystery. After the examination, Griggs realized that the pin could not be inserted in modern times, and must have been placed post-mortem, a hypothesis confirmed by further analysis. The pin was held in place by an organic resin, analogous to modern bone cement. By doing so, those who performed the operation ensured the integrity of the body, required for the ancient Egyptian afterlife.
