= Ralph Maxwell Lewis =

Imperator of AMORC (1904–1987)

- Born: February 14, 1904; New York City, New York, United States
- Died: January 12, 1987 (aged 82)
- Organization: AMORC
- Title: Imperator of AMORC
- Term: 1939–1987
- Predecessor: Harvey Spencer Lewis
- Successor: Gary L. Stewart
- Father: Harvey Spencer Lewis

Ralph Maxwell Lewis (February 14, 1904 – January 12, 1987), was an American mystic and the second Imperator of the Rosicrucian organisation AMORC from 1939 to 1987. He is the author of a number of books regarding mysticism. His father, Harvey Spencer Lewis, was the first Imperator of AMORC.

== Early life and education ==
Lewis was born to Harvey Spencer Lewis and Mollie Foldsmith Lewis February 14, 1904, in New York City. He received his early education in New York and the New Jersey Military Academy. In 1918, his family took up residence in San Francisco, California, where he began his studies of law and accounting in 1919.

== AMORC ==
Lewis formally joined AMORC in 1921. Following his father's death in 1939, Lewis became the leader (imperator) and was duly elected.

In 1941, he, with several others, was sued by Jeannette Scott Seymour Young for her institutionalization in a mental hospital, which she claimed left her forcibly sterilized. She said Lewis had proposed marriage to her. Lewis denied this, saying she had gone to the mental hospital willingly. He also denied having ever been engaged to her, saying they had met a single time in 1934. He also said the hospital claimed she had never been sterilized there.

In Fédération Universelle des Ordres et Sociétés Initiatiques, FUDOSI, he was known by the nomen mysticum (mystical name) Sar Validivar and received his initiation in Martinism during the second convention of FUDOSI in September 1936. In the same year, he was initiated as a Rose-Croix Order Kabalistique and in the Traditional Martinist Order in Europe. On August 2, 1939, he was elected by the Board of Directors of the Supreme Grand Lodge of AMORC as Imperator of the order, a position he held until his Great Initiation on January 12, 1987.

In March 1940, Lewis was elected President of the International Supreme Council of the order Rosæ Crucis. Among the awards he received in his lifetime was the honorary degree of doctor of literature from Andhra University in India, and the star and the cross of science from the International Academic Council.

He founded the Grand Lodge of Brazil in the summer of 1956, and he commissioned new buildings for the Rosicrucian Egyptian Museum in 1966.

Lewis died January 12, 1987. He was succeeded by Gary L. Stewart.

== Personal life ==
On March 28, 1923, he married Gladys Natishna Hammer, who was known to all Rosicrucians as Soror Gladys Lewis.

== Bibliography ==
- Cosmic Mission Fulfilled (1966)
  - Biography of his father
