= Sons of Ralph =

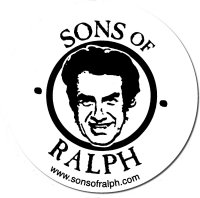

Background information
- Origin: Madison County, North Carolina, United States
- Genres: Bluegrass
- Years active: 2001–present
- Members: Ralph Lewis; Martin Lewis; Don Lewis; Steve Moseley; Ozzie Orengo Jr.

Sons of Ralph is a bluegrass band from Asheville, North Carolina, formed by Ralph Lewis.

== History ==
The band was formed in 2001 by Ralph Lewis (1928-2017) with his sons Martin and Don. Their debut studio album was released in 2001, titled Grab a Root and Growl.

== Members ==
- Ralph Lewis — vocals, vocal harmony, mandolin, fiddle, acoustic guitar, electric guitar
- Martin Lewis — vocals, vocal harmony, acoustic guitar, electric guitar, slide guitar, dobro, harmonica, percussion, keyboards
- Don Lewis — fiddle, banjo, vocals, vocal harmony, acoustic guitar, electric guitar, harmonica
- Steve Moseley — bass guitar, vocals, vocal harmony, acoustic guitar, electric guitar
- Ozzie Orengo Jr. — drums, percussion

=== Ralph Lewis ===
Born on April 25, 1928, in Big Laurel of Madison County, North Carolina, he played the guitar and mandolin at a young age. He was the youngest of seven sons, the same as his father who was also a seventh son. With his brother Ervin, Ralph hosted radio shows under the name Carolina Pals. After moving to Niagara Falls, New York, he formed a band with his brother, Blanco. In 2001, he received the Bascom Lamar Lunsford Award. Married to Imogene with whom he parented four children, Ralph formed the Sons of Ralph with his sons Martin and Don. Known as a pioneer in bluegrass, he died at the age of 89 on August 5, 2017.
