= AMORC =

Rosicrucian organization

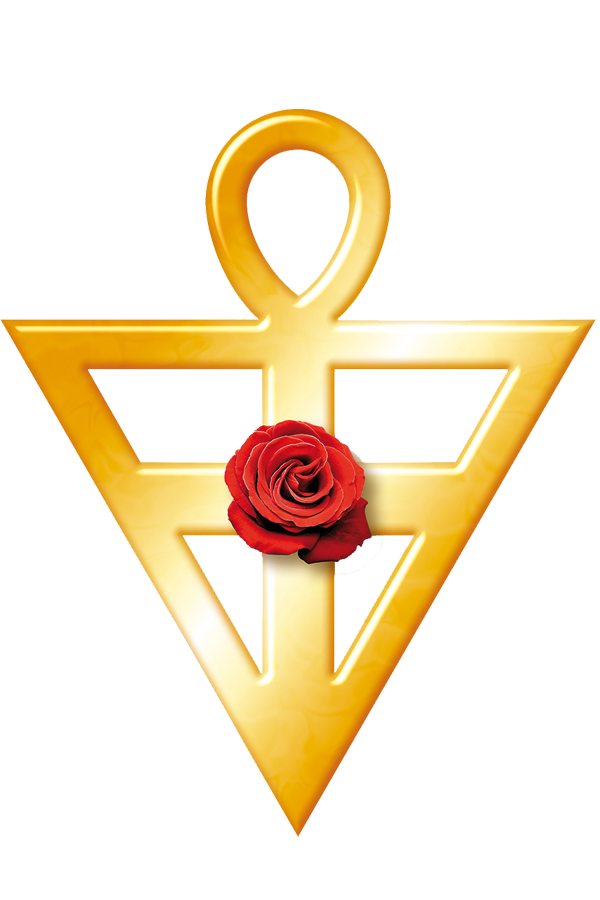
- Formation: 1915; 111 years ago
- Founder: Harvey Spencer Lewis
- Founded at: United States
- Type: Rosicrucian order
- Headquarters: San Jose, California
- Imperator: Claudio Mazzucco
- Publication: Rosicrucian Digest and Rosicrucian Forum
- Formerly called: Rosicrucian Research Society, Ancient Mystical Order of the Rosy Cross

AMORC (standing for, among others, the Ancient Mystical Order of the Rosy Cross, Antiquus Mysticusque Ordo Rosae Crucis or the Ancient and Mystical Order Rosæ Crucis) is a Rosicrucian organization founded by Harvey Spencer Lewis in the United States in 1915. It has lodges, chapters and other affiliated bodies in several countries. It operates as a fraternal order in the mystical Western Esoteric Tradition. There are 12 grand lodges that represent the geographical regions and languages in which AMORC operates, including English, French, and German grand lodges. It is the largest Rosicrucian order.

The order is led by the Supreme Grand Lodge, led by the leaders of the grand lodges. The head of the order as a whole is the Grand Imperator, or Imperator. Since 2019 Claudio Mazzucco occupies the office. They operate two periodicals, the Rosicrucian Digest, and a members' only periodical, the Rosicrucian Forum. Their headquarters are located in San Jose, California. At Rosicrucian Park in San Jose they operate the Rosicrucian Egyptian Museum, a planetarium, and a temple. The park is a local tourist attraction.

== History ==
=== Background and founding ===
Harvey Spencer Lewis founded the Rosicrucian Research Society in 1904. Lewis was an advertising agent and occultist who had affiliated with several other orders.

He either founded AMORC or changed the name of the Rosicrucian Research Society to AMORC after a trip to France, claiming that he had been initiated into Rosicrucianism there in an "old tower" in Toulouse. He presented this as a revival of the original, partially mythical and ancient Rosicrucian Order. The Ancient Mystical Order of the Rosy Cross (AMORC) was founded in 1915. Lewis was the first Imperator, or leader, of the group.

=== Mid-20th century ===
The group later moved to San Francisco, Tampa, and in 1928 finally moved to San Jose, where their headquarters remain. The group was successful in the US and grew rapidly, leading to conflict with other Rosicrucian orders. Older Rosicrucian orders, particularly the Fraternitas Rosae Crucis, said they were not truly Rosicrucian. Lewis then accused the FRC's leader, R. Swinburne Clymer, an alternative medicine practitioner, of receiving his MD from a diploma mill. This exchange resulted in a decades long feud involving several Rosicrucian orders. With its creation came public meetings and a sizable publicity campaign. As a result, AMORC is the most publicly well known Rosicrucian order.

Several branches in Europe were founded, which were mostly independent from the main branch of AMORC. Several of these groups would later splinter off into their own organizations, but Lewis kept the significant French branch of AMORC tied to the parent by collaborating with its leader Jeanne Guesdon. A Danish Grand Lodge was established in 1920, the organization's first presence in Scandinavia. Lewis died in 1939. Lewis was succeeded by his son, Ralph Maxwell Lewis.

AMORC was extremely successful in Francophone countries; as a result, in the 1970s, AMORC made an effort to centralize control over Francophone esotericism generally, creating their own orders for specific kinds of esotericism. At this time, Raymond Bernard was the leader of Francophone AMORC, making him the second highest ranking person in the organization's entire hierarchy. Bernard decided that controlling a parallel neo-Templar order to AMORC would help keep AMORC members also desiring Templar initiation within the milieu of the organization. In October 1970, Bernard incorporated the neo-Templar Renewed Order of the Temple (French: Ordre rénové du Temple, ORT) as an association at the suggestion of Julien Origas. AMORC also created an AMORC-tied Martinist order.

It utilized a double structure, where Bernard was the secret grand master and real leader, but with Origas as the formal president of the organization. This was done in order to keep the ORT subservient but also separate from AMORC, a structure which was accepted by Ralph Lewis in October 1972. They were endorsed in AMORC's official bulletin in 1970, who said they were the only legitimate Templar group. Lewis grew concerned over the ORT's increasing success negatively impacting AMORC's international performance, and Bernard left as a result. Origas succeeded him as leader. After he left, Bernard began discouraging AMORC members from joining the ORT. Origas later entirely split from AMORC.

=== Gary Stewart leadership dispute ===
Ralph Lewis died in 1987, and was succeeded as Imperator by Gary L. Stewart. Stewart was young, at 34, but was able to be elected with the support of Raymond Bernard. In 1990, after what was described by sociologist David V. Barrett as a "bitter dispute" with the order's board of directors, or "an apparent coup", though the circumstances are uncertain, Stewart was accused of embezzling $3.5 million from the group to an Andorran bank account. He was then forced out of AMORC in a unanimous vote by the board of directors. They withdrew Stewart's authority and with it, the order as a whole was reorganized.

Stewart alleged that this had been in retaliation for his concern over textual changes from the Lewis's original manuscripts. The leadership battle likely resulted in a large loss of membership for AMORC and in factionalism forming within and outside of AMORC, including several schisms. This whole saga resulted in an abundance of local media attention. Stewart later founded his own Rosicrucian order. Stewart was replaced as Imperator by Christian Bernard, the grand master of French AMORC. His father Raymond Bernard later left and abandoned all ties with the order. Scholar Kjersti Løken noted Stewart's "three years in office are all but deleted from AMORC’s history".

=== Later history ===
Imperator Christian Bernard was replaced as Imperator by Claudio Mazzucco in 2019.

== Organization ==
There are 12 grand lodges that represent AMORC's geographical regions and languages. For languages, there are individual grand lodges for French, Portuguese, German, Greek, Italian, Dutch, Nordic languages, and Japanese speakers. There are two separate English lodges for Europe and Africa and the Americas, respectively, and two Spanish lodges for the old and new world regions. Each grand lodge is led by a grand master. AMORC as a whole is operated by the San Jose-based Supreme Grand Lodge, made up of the grand masters of all 12 lodges. The head of the order as a whole is the Grand Imperator, or Imperator. It is structured into lodges, each with at least 50 members, that perform initiation rituals of specific degrees. There are two inner sanctums, the Pronaoi and chapters. The smallest unit is an "atrium", of seven people.

=== List of Imperators ===
- Harvey Spencer Lewis (1915–1939, death)
- Ralph Maxwell Lewis (1939–1987, death)
- Gary L. Stewart (1987–1990, ousted)
- Christian Bernard (1990–2019)
- Claudio Mazzucco (2019–)

== Regional organizations ==
=== French Grand Lodge ===
The French branch of AMORC is particularly powerful owing to AMORC's popularity in Francophone nations. The grand master of the French branch was Jeanne Guesdon, then Raymond Bernard, then his son Christian Bernard.

=== Scandinavian Grand Lodge ===
In 1916, Danish esotericist Carli Andersen was initiated into AMORC after meeting Lewis, and was initiated into its 7th degree in 1919. She then returned to Denmark. Afterwards, she and several others asked Lewis to create a Danish Grand Lodge, which was established in 1920, the organization's first presence in Scandinavia. There were probably Norwegian AMORC adherents prior to this who directly took their instruction from America, and the Denmark lodge also served Norway. Svend Turning was that Grand Lodge's grand master. The lodge grew under his leadership. He retired and was succeeded as grand master by Edvard Emil Andersen. Another lodge, this one in Sweden, was established in 1933. By 1961, the grand master of the Danish lodge was Arthur Sundstrup. They began distributing a Norwegian periodical in 1968, the Rosenkorset i Norge; this was later combined with the other Scandinavian publications into Rosenkorset. This ceased publication in 2007.

In 1976, due to their small size, the Danish and Swedish lodges were shut down and combined to form one unified Nordic Grand Lodge, later renamed the Scandinavian Grand Lodge in 2001 due to the establishment of a Finnish section. The scope of this lodge was to include Norway, Denmark, Sweden, Iceland, and Finland; their first grandmaster was Irving Söderlund from 1977, replaced by the Norwegian Live Söderlund in 1994.

Scandinavian AMORC operates in Danish/Norwegian and Swedish and sends out courses in those languages. Two lodges are open for public meetings in Denmark. As of 2016, most Scandinavian AMORC members are from Norway. Their headquarters were located in Gothenburg, Sweden, but are currently located in Onsala. As of 2016 they had about 1200 members, down from 2000 in 1982.

In 1992 a conflict over the modernization of AMORC doctrine (and influence by New Age ideas) resulted in the grand master expelling a local leader; they and several others then affiliated with Stewart's schismatic group. This formed another schism, the Den Norske Orden av Rosen og Korset.

=== AMORC – Finland ===
Though it technically became independent of it in 1998, Finland is included in the administration of the Scandinavian Grand Lodge but is administrated separately. AMORC was operating in the country at least by the 1950s. In the 1970s, the Scandinavian Grand Lodge began translating their materials into Finnish in order to facilitate a split.

The chapter in Finland is not technically a Grand Lodge (it does not have enough members), though it operates as one in practice. Most members practice privately with correspondence courses. Beginning in 1998, they have published the journal Rosa et crux, which discusses esoteric and cultural topics. Many articles are translations from other AMORC publications, though much is original.

== Teachings and activities ==
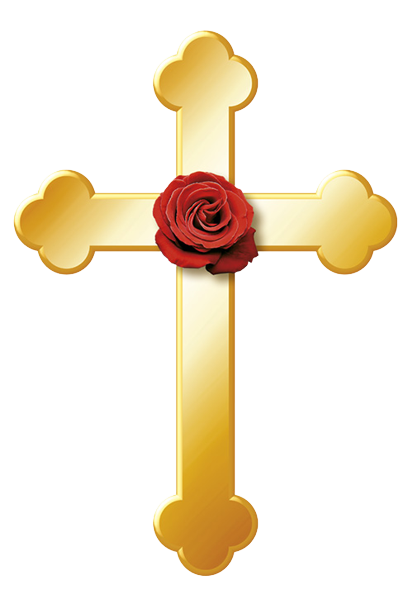
Cross of the Rosicrucian Order

The beliefs of Rosicrucianism center around understanding the purpose of life in accordance with God. AMORC believes success comes from "mastership", described by scholar J. Gordon Melton as "the ability to bring into material expression one’s mental imaging." The teachings of AMORC are supposed to lead students to this mastery, and through imaging they aim to acquire ideal states of health, happiness, etc. This is mostly done through correspondence courses that are mailed to adherents; completing one course grants access to another increasingly advanced set, though attendance of local centers or lodges is also sometimes available.

The symbol of the group is a red rose on a gold cross bottony, with the cross representing the concepts of death and resurrection and the rose representing love as well as secrecy. Together, they represent the usage of reincarnation progressing towards perfection. The group maintains it is not a religion, instead saying it has members (who it calls "students") from many different religious origins. It considers itself a continuation of the ancient mystery schools, and traces its origins to Ancient Egypt and various Egyptian pharaohs.

Scholar Henrik Bogdan described AMORC's beliefs as "highly eclectic", but with a "firm foundation in occultist spirituality". Scholar Christiansen Senholt noted that they had a "broader view of what Rosicrucianism is and encompasses", incorporating a variety of mystical elements. Beliefs involve Ancient Egyptian elements; other beliefs include ones in reincarnation, auras, and black magic. They use the word "transition" as a term for death, viewing death to be an inappropriate term because death is simply "just a transition" where the physical body will separate from the soul. Lewis wrote that "the soul of man, or the divine essence which animates him is the only part of man which is not subject to the law of change". They incorporate Hermetica, Ancient Egyptian religion, and Greek philosophy into their belief system as well.

Aspects of its teachings and symbolism are taken from other occult groups that H. Lewis had frequented. Chief among these is the Ordo Templi Orientis, led by Aleister Crowley. Other symbols of AMORC were taken from other periodicals. While predominantly Rosicrucian, some later AMORC degrees also incorporate neo-Templar elements. The emblem of the group, the Rose Cross, was taken from a periodical run by Crowley (Equinox III).

The order operates a periodical, the Rosicrucian Digest, and a members' only periodical, the Rosicrucian Forum. In 1991 the Rosicrucian Digest had a circulation of 40,000, while their member's only periodical had about 10,700. In 1995, the group reported that it had 1,200 lodges in 86 countries, with 250,000 members being reported in 1990. At Rosicrucian Park in San Jose they operate the Rosicrucian Egyptian Museum, a planetarium, and a temple. The park is a local tourist attraction. They are the largest Rosicrucian order in the world.

== See also ==
- FUDOSI
- FUDOFSI
- Martinism
- Hermeticism
- New religious movement
