= Christian Bernard =

French Rosicrucian (born 1951)

- Born: November 30, 1951 (age 74); France
- Organization: AMORC
- Title: Imperator of AMORC
- Term: 1990–2019
- Predecessor: Gary L. Stewart
- Successor: Claudio Mazzucco
- Father: Raymond Bernard

Christian Bernard (born 30 November 1951) is a French Rosicrucian and the former Imperator of the Rosicrucian order AMORC. He became imperator in 1990, succeeding Gary L. Stewart. He was succeeded as imperator by Claudio Mazzucco in 2019.

== Biography ==
Christian Bernard was born in France on 30 November 1951. He is the son of esotericist Raymond Bernard, who had previously been the leader of the French branch of AMORC. His father later distanced himself from AMORC. According to AMORC, Christian Bernard became a Rosicrucian at the age of 15. He first became the grand secretary and then was the grand master of French AMORC in the period of 1977 to 1993.

Christian Bernard and his wife Helene have three children. The family is dedicated to the esoteric duties of AMORC, and all his children are also Rosicrucians. At age 39, Bernard was elected as Imperator (leader) when the former Imperator, Gary L. Stewart, was ousted from the organization in 1990 after allegations of financial impropriety. Stewart accused Bernard and the grand master of German AMORC Wilhelm Raab of having made their own changes to AMORC doctrine, which he said resulted in the different language branches of AMORC having entirely different teachings. He said that when he had questioned this he had been ousted. Bernard became Imperator April 12, 1990, and was re-elected four times. He was replaced as imperator by Claudio Mazzucco in 2019.

== Publications ==
- So Mote It Be (1995)
- Questions And Answers (2001)
- Rosicrucian Reflections (2012)
