= Harvey Spencer Lewis =

American writer and mystic (1883–1939)

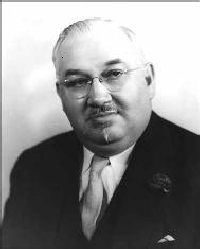
- Born: November 25, 1883; Frenchtown, New Jersey, United States
- Died: August 2, 1939 (aged 55)
- Organization: AMORC
- Title: Imperator of AMORC
- Term: 1915–1939
- Successor: Ralph Maxwell Lewis
- Children: Ralph Maxwell Lewis

Harvey Spencer Lewis (November 25, 1883 – August 2, 1939) was an American Rosicrucian writer, mystic and the founder of AMORC. He led AMORC as its first leader (imperator) from its creation in 1915 until his death.

== Early life ==
Lewis was born November 25, 1883, in Frenchtown, New Jersey. His parents were of Welsh and German ancestry. Lewis was an advertising agent.

== Esotericism ==
He had founded a group called the New York Institution for Psychical Research. The Ancient Mystical Order of the Rosy Cross (AMORC) was founded in 1915. He founded the organization after a trip to France with his father, claiming that he had been initiated into Rosicrucianism and was given a mission to spread it there in what he called an "old tower" in Toulouse. He presented this as a revival of the original, partially mythical and ancient Rosicrucian Order.

Lewis affiliated with many occult groups, especially Aleister Crowley's Ordo Templi Orientis. Following a 1916 split in the O.T.O., the schismatic German branch recognized AMORC, giving him a document to prove this. He was proud of receiving this document, despite differences in belief between the two organizations (AMORC did not practice sex magic). While predominantly Rosicrucian, the works of Lewis also incorporate neo-Templar elements, having a particular interest in the 18th century revivalist order of Bernard-Raymond Fabré-Palaprat and the Knights Templar. Lewis had had some contact with neo-Templar figures and related European occultists, including Émile Dantinne.

Lewis was interested in Egyptology, and founded the Rosicrucian Egyptian Museum in San Jose. It is located in Rosicrucian Park.

== Works ==
In 1931, Lewis, under the pen name Wishar S[penle] Cerve, wrote a book (published by the Rosicrucians) about the hidden Lemurians of Mount Shasta that a bibliographic note on Mount Shasta described as "responsible for the legend's widespread popularity." Lewis authored The Mystical Life of Jesus in 1929. The book is notable for defending a variant of the swoon hypothesis that Jesus survived his crucifixion. Lewis plagiarized entire chapters from The Aquarian Gospel of Jesus the Christ by Levi H. Dowling.

== Death ==
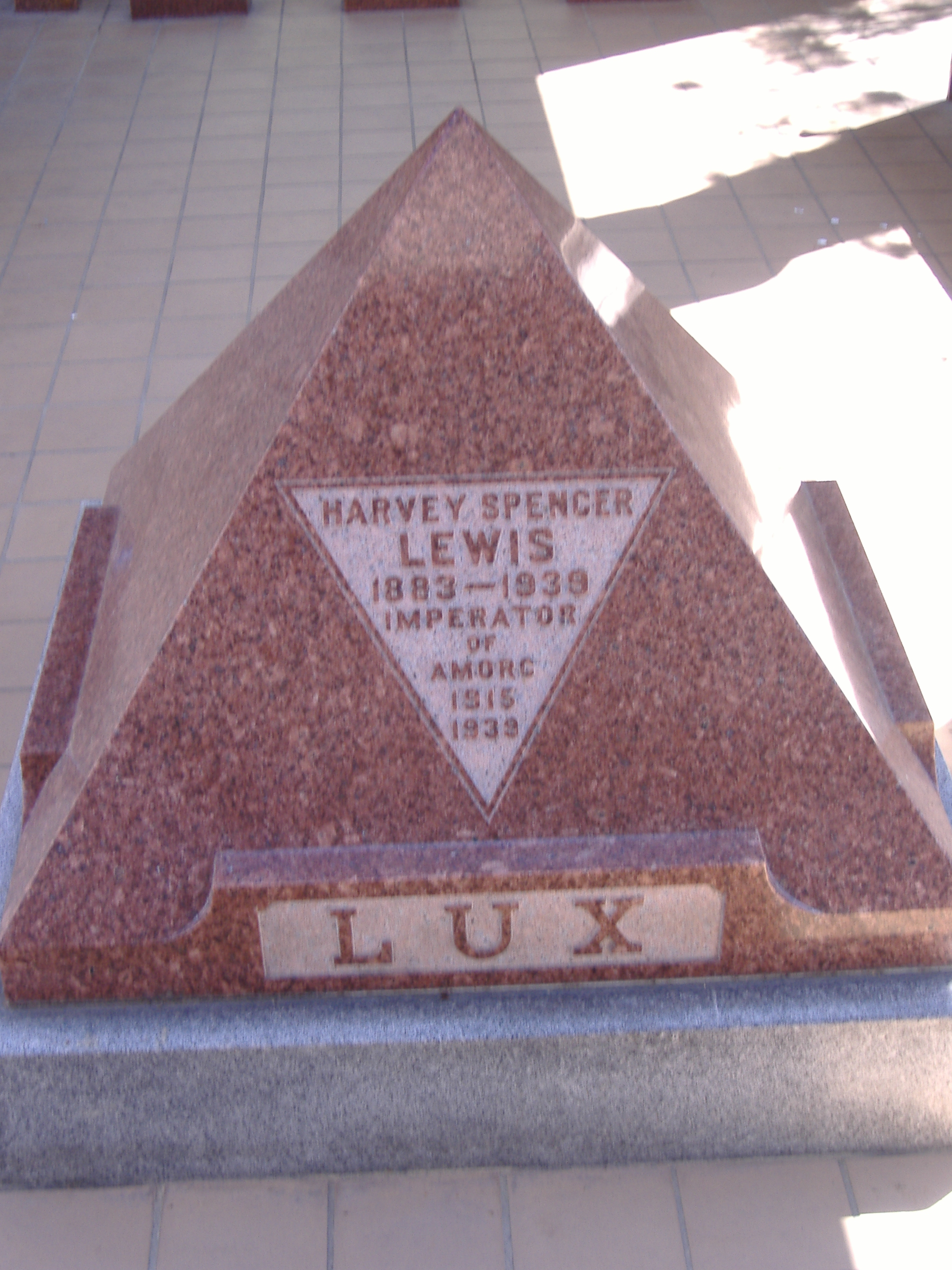
Front of Lewis's burial marker

Lewis died in 1939. He was succeeded as leader of AMORC by his son, Ralph Maxwell Lewis.

== Bibliography ==
- Rosicrucian Principles for the Home and Business (1929)
  - Explains portions of Rosicrucian teachings and philosophy as related to work and personal goals.
- Rosicrucian Questions and Answers with Complete History of the Order
  - A two-part book: Part One gives the "traditional" history of the Rosicrucian Order, with names and works; Part Two answers common new member and prospective member questions.
- The Mystical Life of Jesus
  - A retelling of the life story of Jesus; reportedly plagiarized Levi H. Dowling's Aquarian Gospel.
- Lemuria, The Lost Continent Of the Pacific (1931), as Cerve, Wishar S.
- The Secret Doctrines of Jesus
  - An explanation of many symbols, standards, and interpretations of the work of Jesus and the Twelve Apostles.
- A Thousand Years of Yesterdays
  - A fictional story, explaining reincarnation as a man re-experiences past selves.
- Self Mastery and Fate with the Cycles of Life
  - Relates the Cycles of Life system, similar in nature to biorhythm.
- Rosicrucian Manual (1918, 1929 with reissues)
  - Explains the structure of AMORC and includes everything a new Rosicrucian should know.
- Mansions of the Soul: The Cosmic Conception
  - Essays about Life, Death, the Afterlife, and Rebirth.
- The Symbolic Prophecy of the Great Pyramid
  - Presents an interpretation of Egyptian symbology, with old and new ideas discussed.
- Mental Poisoning
  - An examination of curses, hexes, and psychic manipulation.
