= Outline of spirituality =

Overview of and topical guide to spirituality

The following outline is provided as an overview of and topical guide to spirituality:

Spirituality may refer to an ultimate or an alleged immaterial reality, an inner path enabling a person to discover the essence of their own being, or the "deepest values and meanings by which people live."

Spiritual practices, including meditation, prayer and contemplation, are intended to develop an individual's inner life; spiritual experience includes that of connectedness with a larger reality, yielding a more comprehensive self; with other individuals or the human community; with nature or the cosmos; or with the divine realm.

== Introductory topics ==
- Paranormal
  - Extra-sensory perception
  - Near-death experience
  - Parapsychology (Paraphysics)
    - Anomalous cognition
    - Claims of parapsychology
    - History of parapsychology
  - Precognition
  - Psychokinesis
  - Remote viewing
  - Uri Geller
- Philosophy
  - Epistemology
  - Ethics
  - Free will
  - Idealism
  - Materialism
  - Metaphysics
  - Mechanism
  - Mind-body dualism
  - Mind-body problem
  - Nondualism
  - Noumenon
  - Phenomenalism
  - Phenomenon
  - Philosophy of mind
  - Philosophy of religion
  - Philosophy of science
  - Reductionism
  - Spiritualism
  - Skepticism
  - Truth
  - Vitalism
- Religion
  - Agnosticism
  - Animism
  - Atheism
  - Cult
  - Faith
  - Gnosticism
  - God
  - Goddess
  - Higher consciousness
  - Monotheism
  - Mythology
  - Neo-Pantheism
  - New religious movement
  - Pantheism
  - Polytheism
  - Prayer
  - Religious naturalism
  - Soul
  - Spiritism
  - Spiritual being
- Science
  - Altered state of consciousness
  - Brain
  - Chaos theory
  - Chemistry
  - Cognitive psychology
  - Consciousness
  - Magical thinking
  - Neuropsychology
  - Odic force
  - Paraphysics
  - Parapsychology
  - Physics
  - Pseudoscience
  - Psychiatry
  - Psychology
  - Quantum mechanics
  - Superstition
  - Unconscious mind
- Spirituality
  - Esotericism
  - Ietsism
  - Karma
  - Meditation
  - Merkabah
  - Mysticism
  - New Age
  - Occultism
  - Reincarnation
  - Subtle body

== Eastern ==
=== Esotericism and mysticism ===
==== Shabda ====
- Eckankar
  - Harold Klemp
- Quan Yin Method
  - Suma Ching Hai
- Sant Mat
  - Baba Sawan Singh
  - Radha Soami Satsang Beas
  - Sant Baljit Singh
  - Sant Kirpal Singh
  - Sant Thakar Singh
  - Shiv Dayal Singh
- Surat Shabda Yoga
- Techniques of Knowledge
  - Prem Rawat

==== Other topics ====
- Chakra
  - Ajna / Mind's eye / Third eye
  - Anahata
  - Bindu
  - Manipura
  - Muladhara
  - Sahasrara
  - Subud, or Susila Budhi Dharma
  - Swadhisthana
  - Vishuddha
- Kundalini energy
- Planes of existence
- Tantra
- The Urantia Book
- Yoga

=== Philosophy and religion ===
- Buddhism
  - Mahayana Buddhism
  - Theravada
  - Vajrayana (Tibetan Buddhism)
  - Zen
- Hinduism
  - Bhakti yoga
  - Jnana Yoga
  - Karma yoga
  - List of sutras
  - Śruti
  - Smriti
  - Tantra
  - Upanishads
  - Vedanta
  - Yoga
- I Ching
- Sikhism
  - The Sikh Gurus
  - Guru Granth Sahib
  - Sikh religious philosophy
  - List of Sikhism-related topics
- Taoism
  - Lao Zi
    - Dao De Jing
  - Taiji
  - Universal Dialectic
  - Yin Yang
- The Urantia Book

== Paths ==
=== Inner path ===
"Inner path", as a spiritual or religious concept, is referred to in:

- Spiritual paths
- Involution (Meher Baba)
- Eckankar
- Salik
- Burhaniya
- Gilgul
- Nizari
- Sulook
- Involution (esoterism)
- Ordre Reaux Croix
- Universal Life
- Surat Shabd Yoga or Sant Mat

=== Left-hand path ===
- Left-hand path and right-hand path
- Black art
- Black magic
- Necromancy
- Satanism
  - Baphomet
  - Church of Satan
  - Luciferianism
  - Philosophical Satanism
  - Satan
  - Satanic panic
  - Satanic ritual abuse
  - Anton LaVey
- Vampire
- Temple of Set

== Magic and occult ==
- Aleister Crowley
  - The Book of Thoth
  - Magick
- Chaos magic
- Eliphas Levi
- Enochian magic
- Goetia
- Grimoire
- Necronomicon
- Hoodoo
- Magic
- Occultism
- Pentagram
- Quareia
- Ritual magic
- Santería
- Seid
- Thelema
- Vodou

== Martial arts ==
- Martial arts
  - List of martial arts
  - List of martial arts weapons
- Neijia
  - Baguazhang
  - Xingyiquan
  - Tai chi

== New Age ==
- Age of Aquarius
- New Age
- List of New Age topics
- Qigong

== People ==
- Helena Blavatsky
- Edgar Cayce
- Evelyn Underhill
- G. I. Gurdjieff
- Rudolf Steiner
- Ken Wilber
- Giuliano Kremmerz

== Spiritual and occult practices ==
=== Concentration ===
- Astral projection
- Dhikr
- Meditation
- Muraqaba
- Prayer
- Remote viewing
- Yoga

=== Divination ===
- Astrology
- Augur
- Cartomancy
- Cleromancy
- Divination
- Dowsing
  - Pendulum
- Fortune-telling
- Geomancy
- Haruspex
- I Ching
- Omen
- Tarot reading

=== Other ===
- Lucid dream
- Out-of-body experience

== Western ==
=== Religion, esotericism, and mysticism ===
- Anthroposophy
- Christian mysticism
- Christian mystics
- Esotericism
- Hermeticism
- List of occultists
- Mysticism
- Salvation
- Spiritualism
- Western mystery tradition

==== Organizations ====
- AMORC
- FUDOFSI
- FUDOSI
- Hermetic Order of the Golden Dawn
- Illuminates of Thanateros
- Knights Templar
- Ordo Templi Orientis
- Subud
- List of general fraternities

==== People ====
- Constant Chevillon
- Dion Fortune
- Max Heindel
- Samuel Liddell MacGregor Mathers
- Baron Carl Reichenbach
- Rudolf Steiner
- Osho

==== Rosicrucianism ====
- Ancient Mystical Order Rosae Crucis (AMORC)
- Builders of the Adytum (BOTA)
- Fraternitas Rosae Crucis
- Hermetic Order of the Golden Dawn
- Ordo Templi Orientis
- Rosicrucian Fellowship
- Scottish Rite Freemasonry
- Societas Rosicruciana

=== Occultism and practical mysticism ===
- Alchemy
- Faith healing
- Servants of the Light

==== Neopaganism ====
- Neopaganism
- Paganism
- Rule of Three (Wiccan)
- Wicca

==== Christianity ====
- Catholicism
- Christian mysticism
- Christian Science
- Mount Athos
- Orthodoxy

===== Esoteric Christianity =====
- Anthroposophy
- Christian vegetarianism
- Theosis
- Hesychasm
- Gregory Palamas
- Philokalia

==== Islam ====
===== Sufism =====
- Dhikr
- Lataif-e-Sitta
- Muraqaba
- Qawwali
- Sama
- Sufi cosmology
- Sufi texts
- Sufi whirling

==== Judaism ====
- Kabbalah (also spelled Qabalah, QBLH)

== See also ==
- Involution
- List of occult terms
- Outline of religion
- Synchronicity
