= New religious movements in the United States =

New religious or spiritual groups that originated in the United States

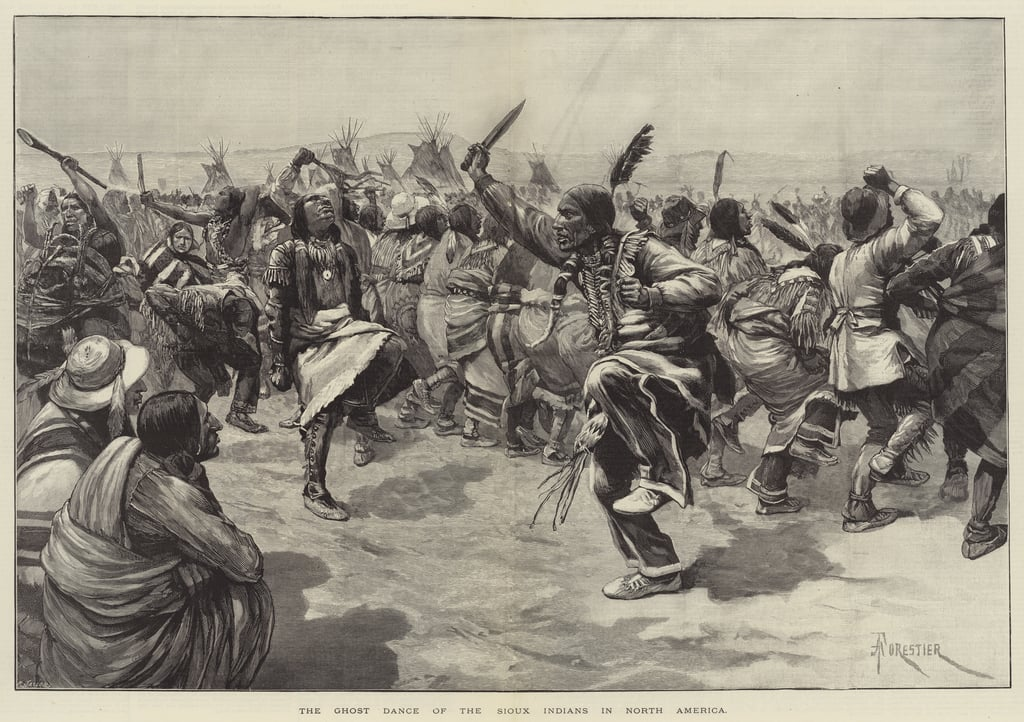
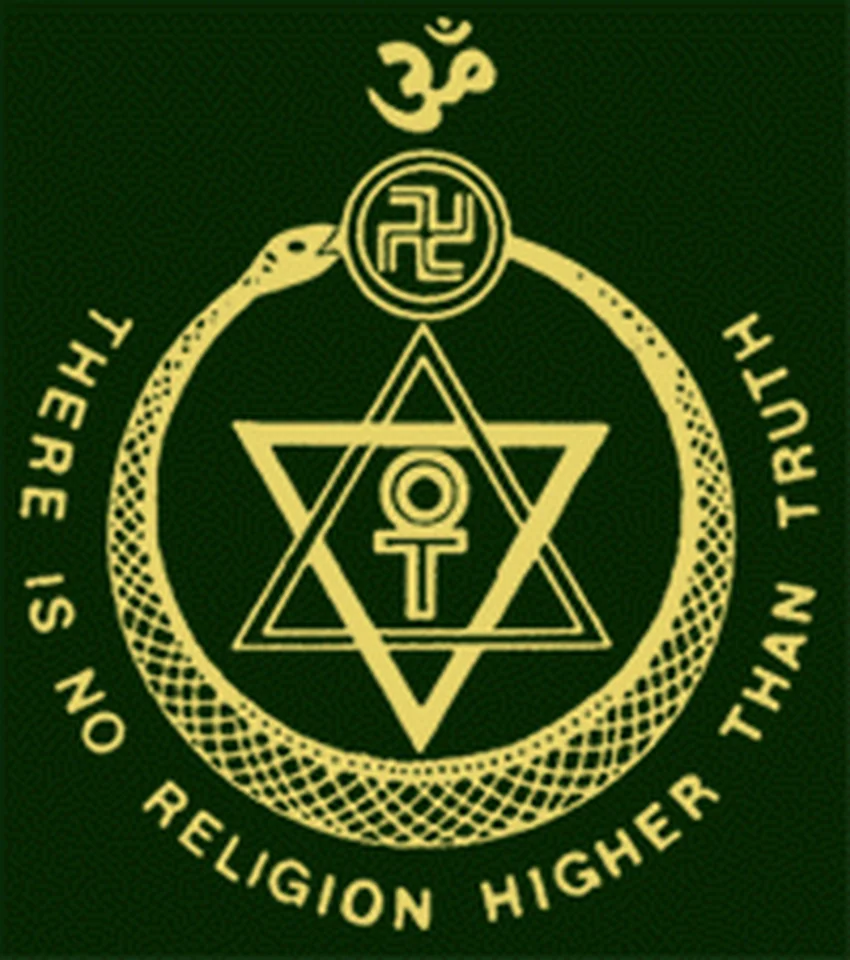
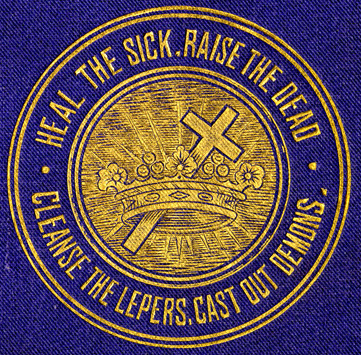
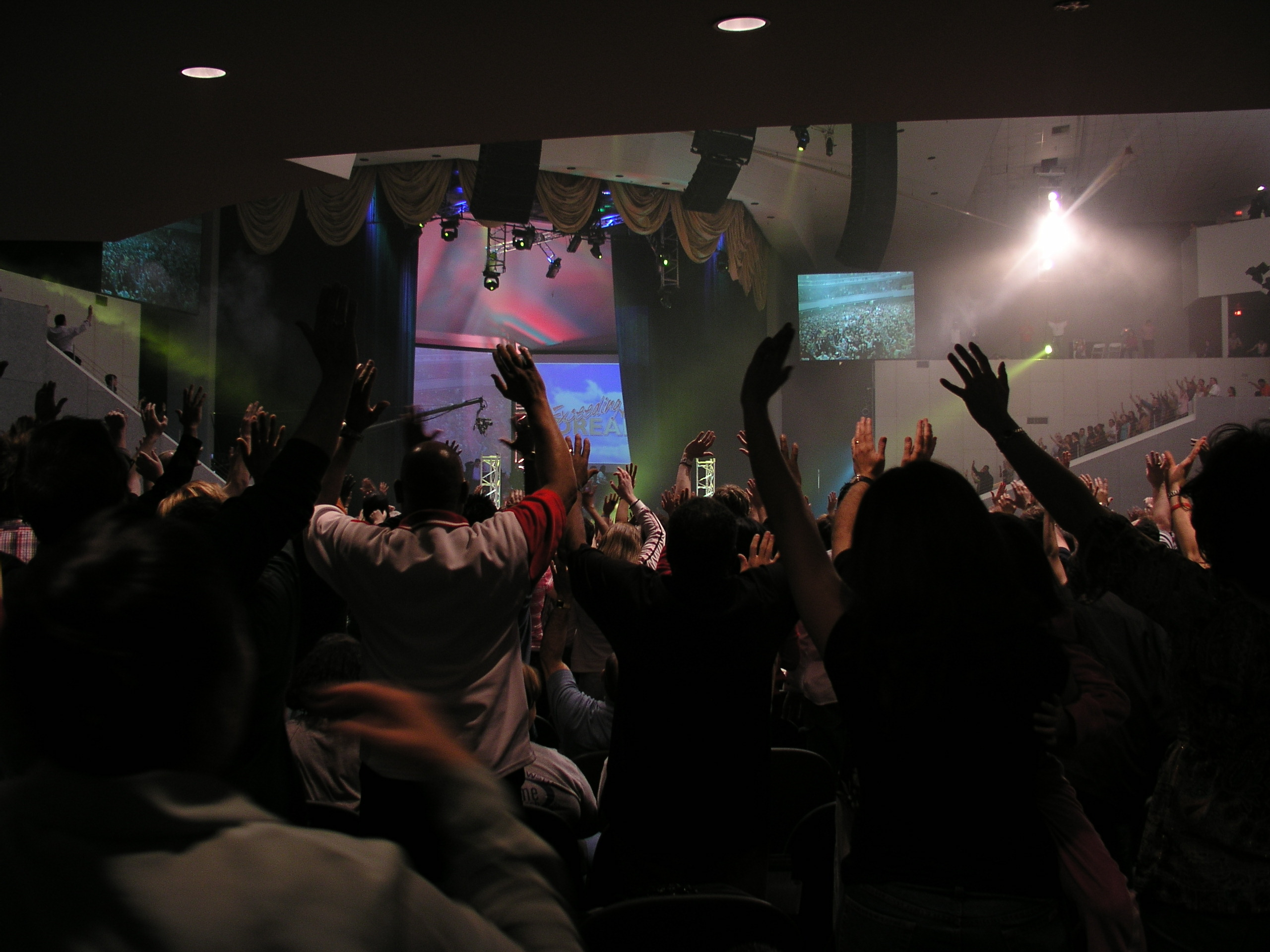
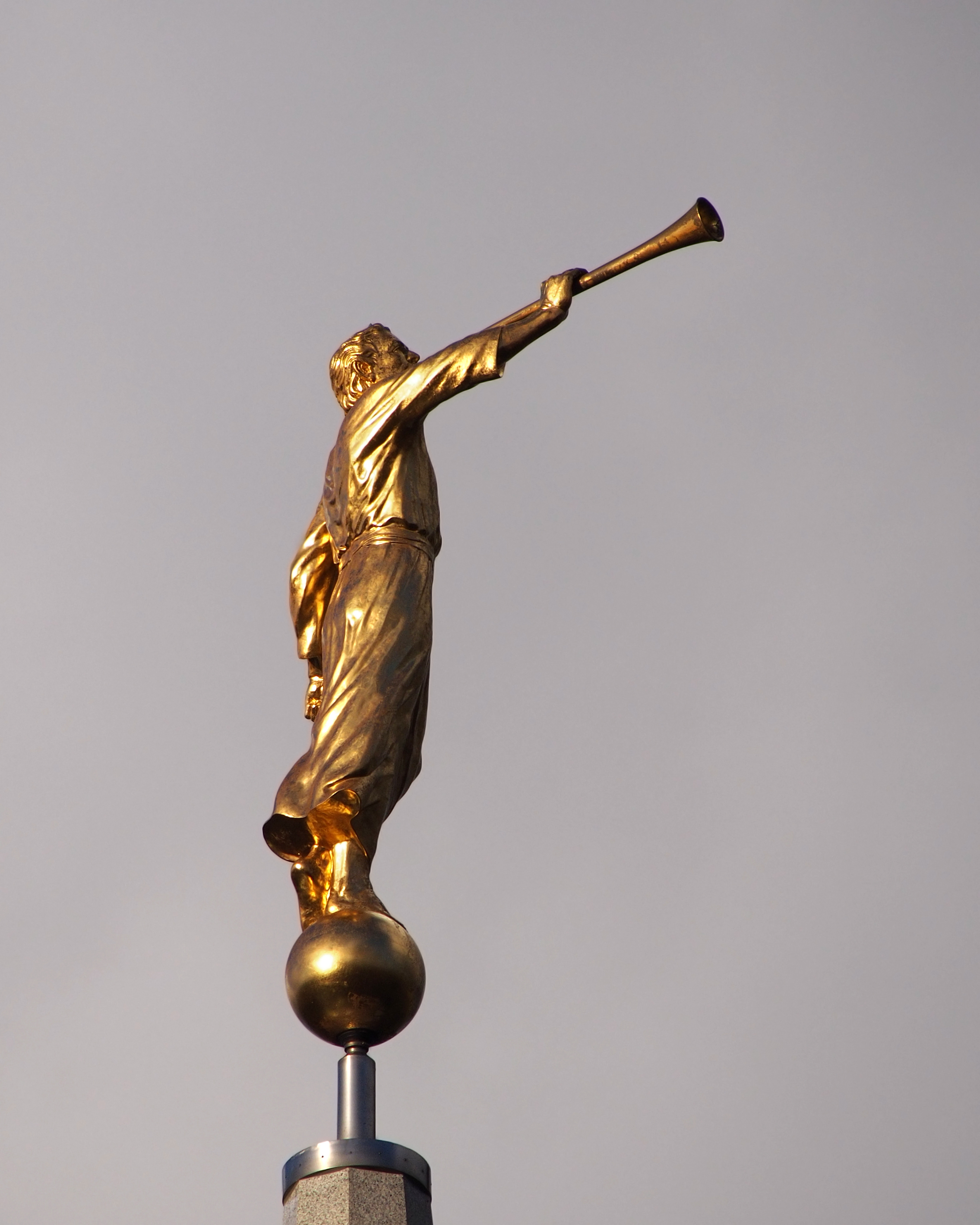
Examples and symbols of new religious movements: a Sioux Ghost dance, the USVA emblem for the Native American Church, the symbol for Theosophy, the Cross and Crown of Christian Science, a Pentecostal worship service and a statue of the LDS angel Moroni.

Numerous new religious movements have formed in the United States. A new religious movement (NRM) is a religious or spiritual group that has modern origins and is peripheral to its society's dominant religious culture. There is no single, agreed-upon criterion for defining a "new religious movement".

Prior to the American Civil War, new movements included Mormonism, led by a prophet; Adventism, which used biblical scholarship to predict the Second Coming of Jesus; New Thought, which promised that mental powers could provide health and success; and Spiritualism, which offered communication with ghosts or spirits. By 1900, flourishing movements included the Jehovah's Witnesses, a group that emerged from Bible tract publishing; Theosophy, whose leader claimed to be in telepathic communication with Masters of the Ancient Wisdom; Christian Science, which promised spiritual healing; and Black Hebrew Israelites, built on a revelation that African Americans are descendants of the Biblical Hebrews. The 20th century saw the rise of black nationalism groups like Moorish Science and Nation of Islam; anti-Christian groups like Thelema, a magic-based movement involving sex rituals and worship of the Whore of Babalon; Scientology, a Thelema-inspired movement whose founder reportedly identified himself with the Antichrist; and Satanism, a movement that encompasses both theistic worshipers of Christian villains and individualist atheists who re-appropriate Christian imagery. The 20th century also saw the rise of the explicitly-atheistic Objectivism movement.

New Native American movements in these eras include the Longhouse Religion, Purification movement, the Ghost Dance movement, the Native American Church and the Indian Shaker Church.

== Overview ==
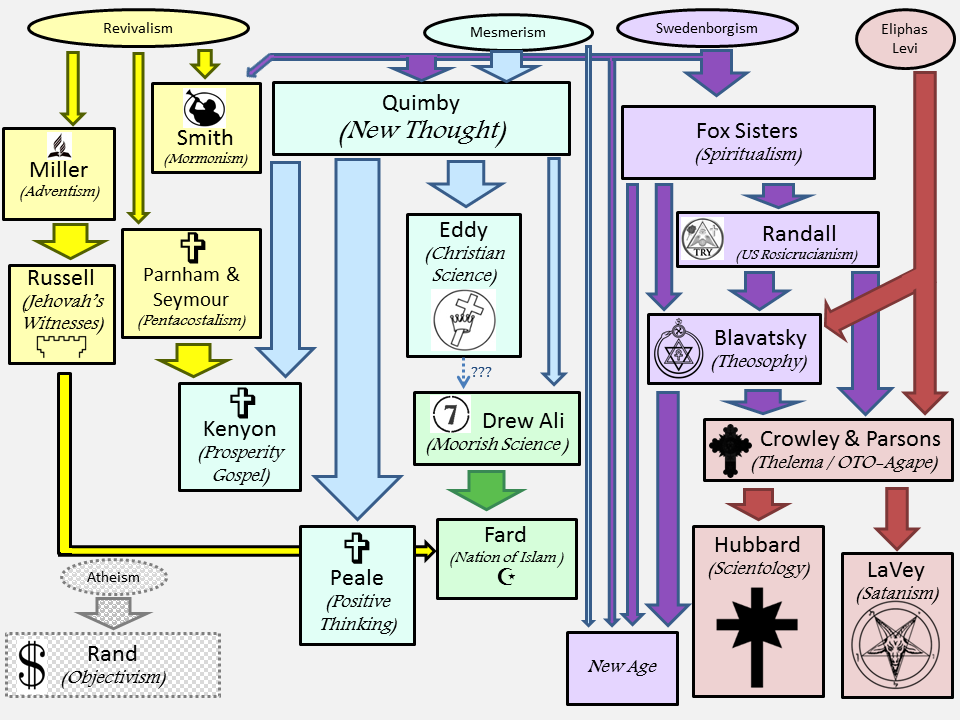
Diagram of American new religious movements.

Revivalism influenced such diverse movements as Joseph Smith's Mormonism (1830), William Miller's Adventism (1831) and Parham and Seymour's Pentecostalism (1900). Adventism in turn influenced Charles Taze Russell's Jehovah's Witnesses.

Mesmerism influenced Phineas Parkhurst Quimby's New Thought Movement. One of Quimby's patients, Mary Baker Eddy, later founded her own new religious movement, Christian Science. E. W. Kenyon and the Word of Faith movement synthesized New Thought with Pentecostalism, while Norman Vincent Peale's Power of Positive Thinking incorporated New Thought doctrines into a blend of Methodism and Calvinism. Noble Drew Ali's Moorish Science was influenced by New Thought and in turn influenced Wallace Fard Muhammad's Nation of Islam.

Swedenborgism influenced the Fox Sisters's Spiritualism as well as Joseph Smith's Mormonism. Spiritualism influenced Paschal Beverly Randolph founder of Fraternitas Rosae Crucis, and Helena Blavatsky, the founder of Theosophy. Blavatsky was influenced by the work of Éliphas Lévi. Aleister Crowley and Jack Parsons's Thelema were influenced by Theosophy and Levi. Thelema influenced Anton LaVey's Satanism and L. Ron Hubbard's Scientology.

Ayn Rand's Objectivism, though explicitly atheist, has been studied through the framework of new religious movements.

== Antebellum movements ==
=== Purification movement ===
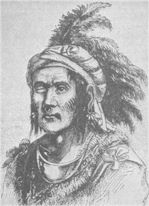
Tenskwatawa sketch

Around 1805, Tenskwatawa, a town drunk, reportedly experienced a stupor so deep that he believed he was dead. According to Tenskwatawa, he visited "the Master of Breath" and was shown Heaven with game and honey for those who lived virtuously and traditionally. Tenskwatawa denounced Euro-American settlers, calling them offspring of the Evil Spirit, and led a purification movement that promoted unity among Native Americans.

By 1808, Tenskwatawa and his brother Tecumseh established a village that the Americans called Prophetstown, and the movement included thousands of followers. On November 7, 1811, while Tecumseh was away, Tenskwatawa ordered the pre-dawn attack on a U.S. military force that initiated the Battle of Tippecanoe. Tenskwatawa's followers retreated after a two-hour engagement and abandoned Prophetstown, which the military burned to the ground. This event was a catalyst for the War of 1812, as the United States blamed the British for providing financial support and ammunition to the Prophetstown community.

Tecumseh was killed at the Battle of the Thames in 1813, and the resistance movement did not recover and was eventually defeated. Tenskwatawa remained in exile in Canada for nearly a decade. After the 1817 Treaty of Fort Meigs, he returned to the United States in 1824 to assist the U.S. government with the Shawnee removal to reservation land in what is now Kansas. The aging Prophet arrived at Shawnee reservation lands in 1828 and faded into obscurity. Tenskwatawa died in Argentine, Kansas, in 1836.

=== Latter Day Saint movement ===
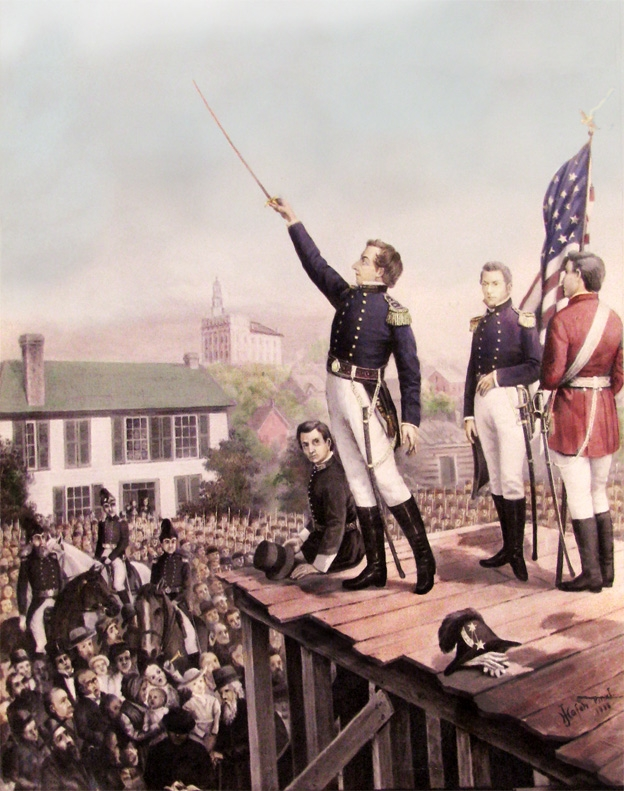
Last Public Address of Lieutenant General Joseph Smith (1888)

On March 20, 1826, a 20-year-old tenant farmer named Joseph Smith was arrested on charges of being "a disorderly person and an imposter" in Bainbridge, New York. According to court records, Smith said "he had a certain stone which he had occasionally looked at to determine where hidden treasures in the bowels of the earth were; that he professed to tell in this manner where gold mines were a distance under ground".

Starting on September 22, 1827, Smith reported that he had recovered a set of ancient plates and a pair of magical "spectacles". Smith refused to allow anyone to view the plates, though some people were allowed to heft them or feel them through a cloth. On March 26, 1830, Smith published the Book of Mormon, a purported translation of the ancient plates, which told the story of ancient Hebrews who traveled to the Americas with the aid of a divinely-provided compass. Thereafter, Smith began directly issuing revelations.

By 1840, Joseph Smith and thousands of followers founded a settlement which Smith named Nauvoo, Illinois. Smith simultaneously served as the prophet of the nascent church, mayor of the city, chief justice of the local court, and general of the city's 2,500-man militia (the "Nauvoo Legion"). In 1844, Smith began a campaign to be elected President of the United States, and by April 1844, a Mormon council had declared Smith to be a king. On June 18, 1845, Smith declared martial law in Nauvoo and called out the Legion. Smith and his brother were arrested on charges of treason; a mob killed both before being brought to trial.

As of December 2019, the most-populous Latter Day Saint denomination reported having 16 million members worldwide.

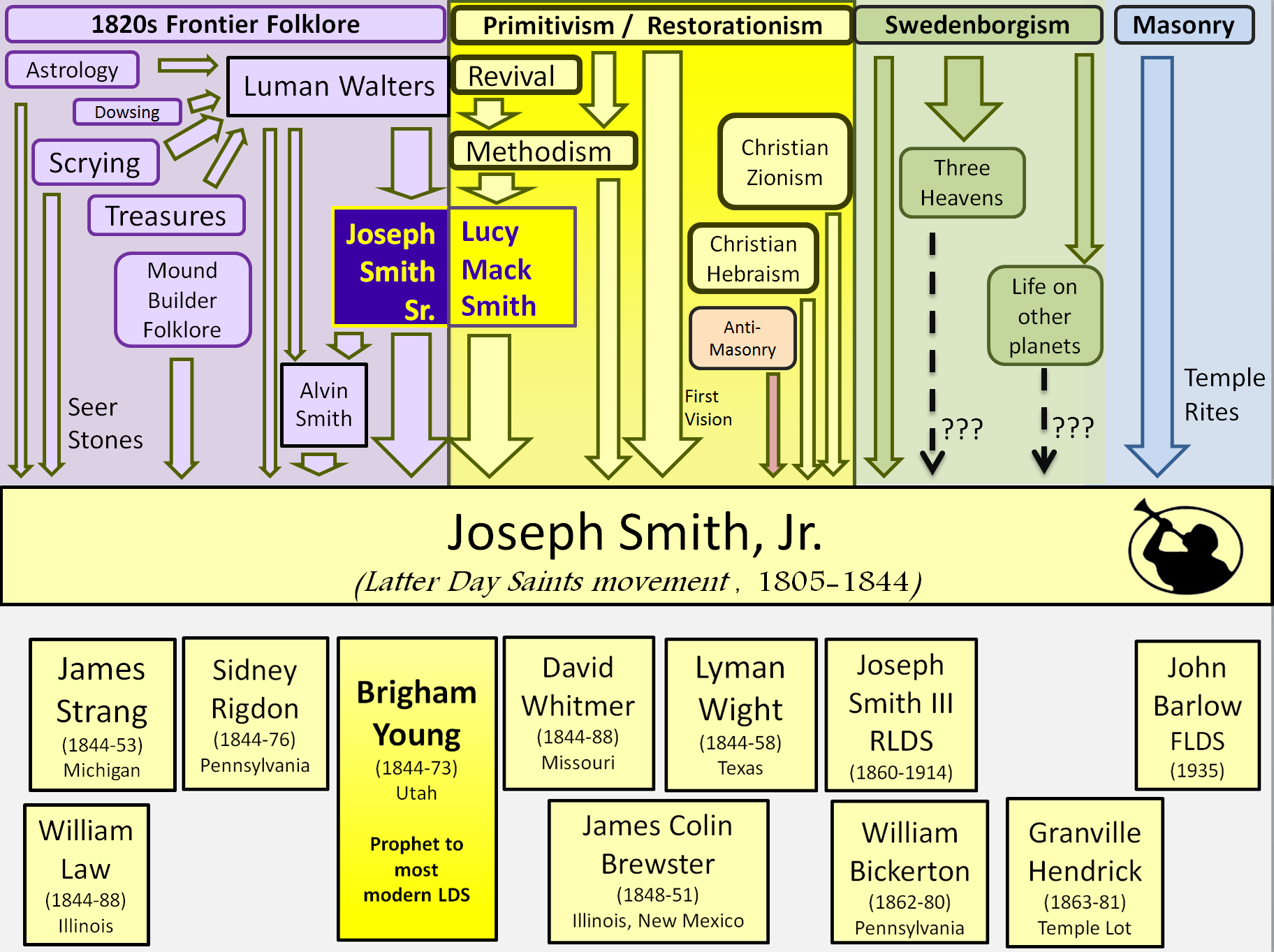
Diagram of Joseph Smith Jr.'s claimed successors and influences. Smith was exposed to a variety of folkloric beliefs common to his time and place, such as Astrology, Scrying with seer stones, Dowsing, and pseudohistorical myths about the Mound Builder culture. Smith's father Joseph Sr. and elder brother Alvin practiced folk magic and sought the counsel of regional seer Luman Walters in their quest for buried treasures. Smith was strongly influenced by the mainstream Christian views, including Christian primitivism or Restorationism, the view that the early beliefs and practices of the followers of Jesus were lost or adulterated after his death and required "restoration"; Revivalism, which used evangelical mass meetings to 'revive' the primitive Church; and Methodism, a mainstream Christian denomination known for revival meetings. Smith's mother Lucy Mack had ties to Methodism. Smith's early teachings were interpreted as being hostile to Freemasonry, though later in life, Smith became a Mason and incorporated Masonic elements into his teachings. Smith studied Hebrew and incorporated Hebrew themes into his church, even calling non-members "gentiles". Smith called for his followers to gather together in a New Jerusalem. Smith was familiar with Christian mystic Emanuel Swedenborg, leading to speculation that Smith drew inspiration from Swedenborg's belief in three heavens and life on other planets. Upon Smith's death, claimed successors included Sidney Rigdon, David Whitmer, William Law, James Strang, Lyman Wight, and Brigham Young. Latter leaders include James Collins Brewster, Joseph Smith III, William Bickerton and Granville Hendrick. In the 20th century, John Y. Barlow created the Fundamentalist LDS church.

=== Adventism ===
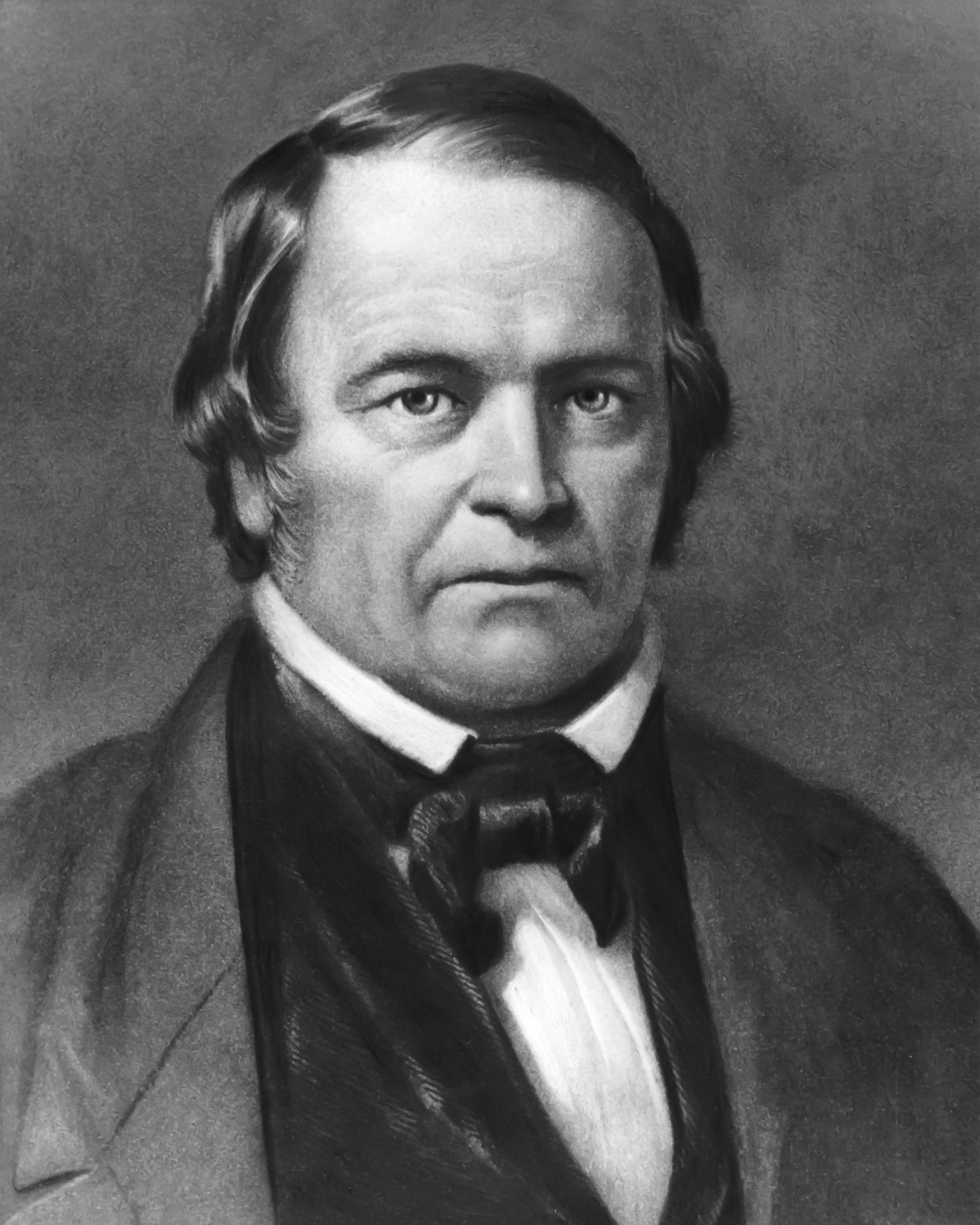
William Miller

William Miller was a prosperous farmer, a Baptist lay preacher, and student of the Bible living in northeastern New York. In 1832, Miller submitted a series of sixteen articles predicting Christ's return (or "advent") sometime between March 21, 1843, and March 21, 1844. Estimates of Miller's followers—the Millerites—vary between 50,000, and 500,000.

After March 21, 1844, passed without incident, the prediction was revised with a new date of April 18. After that date passed without Christ's return, Millerites settled upon a third date of October 22. After the failure of Miller's expectations for October 22, 1844, the date became known as the Millerites' Great Disappointment.

Following the Great Disappointment, most Millerites simply gave up their beliefs. Some did not, and viewpoints and explanations proliferated. Miller initially seems to have thought that Christ's Second Coming was still going to take place—that "the year of expectation was according to prophecy; but...that there might be an error in Bible chronology, which was of human origin, that could throw the date off somewhat and account for the discrepancy." Miller never gave up his belief in the Second Coming of Christ.

Miller's legacy includes the Seventh-day Adventist Church with over 19 million members and the Advent Christian Church with 61,000 members.

=== New Thought ===
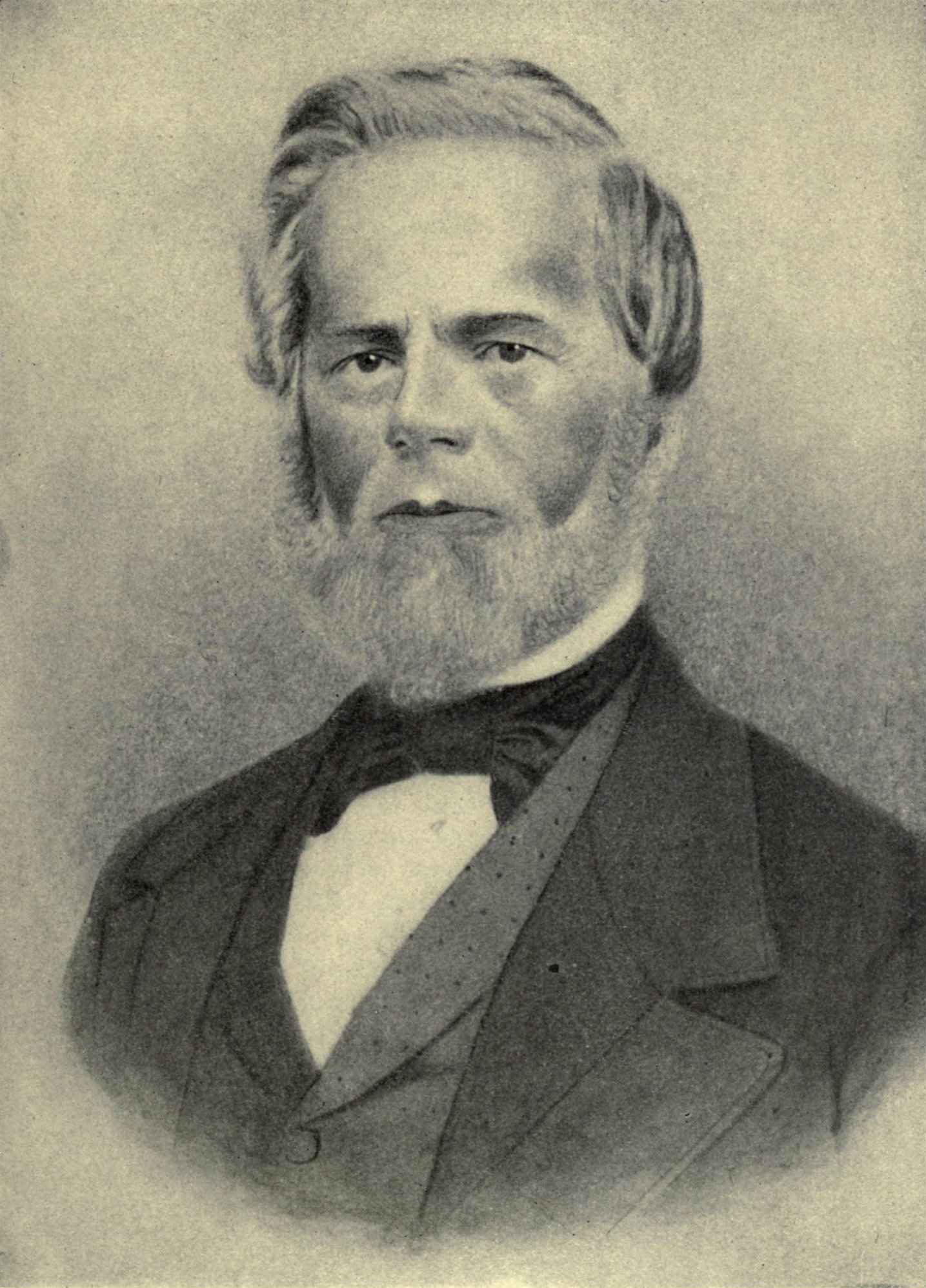
Phineas Parkhurst Quimby

In 1838, Phineas Parkhurst Quimby attended a lecture about Mesmerism by French mesmerist Charles Poyen. Quimby followed Poyen's tour for the next two years, studying Mesmerism. During this time, Quimby encountered an uneducated youth who was particularly susceptible to Mesmerism and developed a tour of his own, demonstrating Mesmerism in front of large crowds.

Quimby claimed to heal people of ailments that doctors could not cure. Quimby told his patients that diseases were caused by false beliefs and that the cure was in explaining this. Scholar William James used the "mind-cure movement" to refer to Quimby and his successors. Quimby is commonly seen as the founder of the New Thought movement.

New Thought publishing and educational activities reach approximately 2.5 million people annually. The largest New Thought-oriented denomination is the Japanese Seicho-no-Ie. Other belief systems within the New Thought movement include Christian Science, Religious Science, Jewish Science, Moorish Science, Centers for Spiritual Living and Unity. Past denominations have included Psychiana and Father Divine.

=== Spiritualism ===
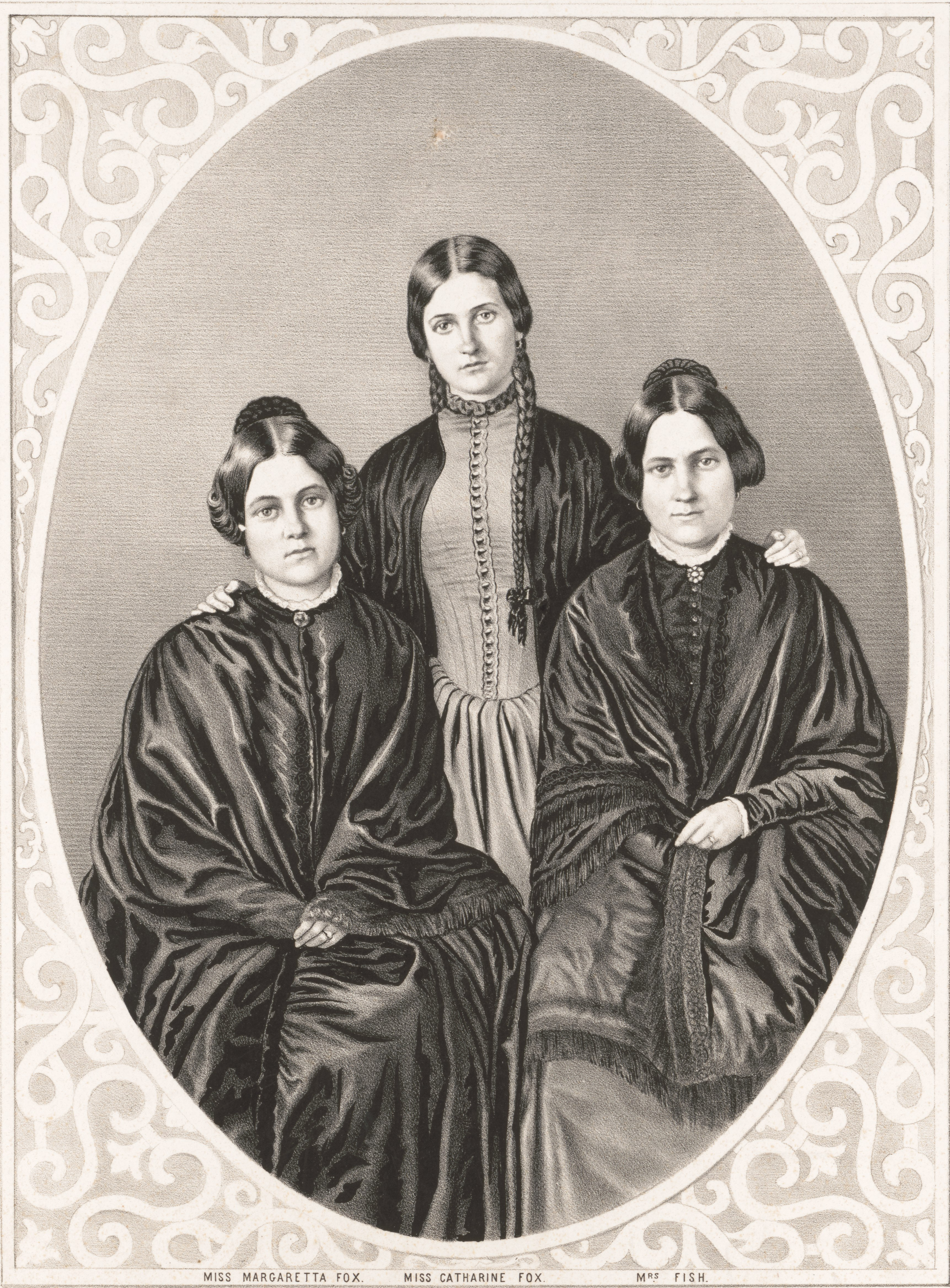
The Fox sisters. From left to right: Margaretta, Kate and Leah

The Fox sisters were three sisters from New York who played an important role in the creation of Spiritualism. The two younger sisters used "rappings" to convince their older sister and others that they were communicating with spirits. Their older sister then took charge of them and managed their careers for some time. They all enjoyed success as mediums for many years.

In 1888, Margaretta confessed that their rappings had been a hoax and publicly demonstrated their method. Margaretta attempted to recant her confession the next year, but their reputation was ruined, and in less than five years, they were all dead, with Margaretta and Kate dying in abject poverty.

By 1897, Spiritualism was said to have more than eight million followers in the United States and Europe, mostly drawn from the middle and upper classes. Spiritualism flourished for a half century without canonical texts or formal organization, attaining cohesion through periodicals, tours by trance lecturers, camp meetings, and the missionary activities of accomplished mediums. Many prominent spiritualists were women, and like most spiritualists, supported causes such as the abolition of slavery and women's suffrage. Spiritualism is currently practiced primarily through various denominational spiritualist churches in the United States, Canada and the United Kingdom.

=== Fraternitas Rosae Crucis ===
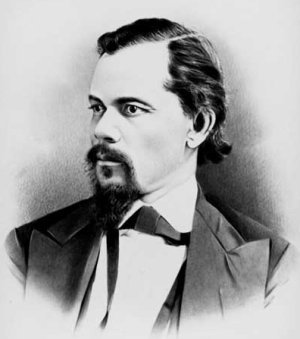
Paschal Beverly Randolph

The Fraternitas Rosae Crucis (Latin for Brothers of the Rosy Cross) was founded by Paschal Beverly Randolph in 1858. Their first lodge was established in San Francisco in 1861, and it remains the oldest Rosicrucian organization in the United States, dating back to the era of the American Civil War. Randolph had long used the pseudonym "The Rosicrucian" for his Spiritualist and occult writings. Though Randolph had an interest in sex magic, it is not practiced by the Fraternitas Rosae Crucis. His magico-sexual theories and techniques formed the basis of much of the teachings of another occult fraternity, the Hermetic Brotherhood of Luxor.

Randolph grew up in New York City, a great-nephew of John Randolph of Roanoke and of mixed English, French, German, Native American and Malagasy ancestry on his mother's side. By his mid-twenties, Randolph regularly appeared on stage as a trance medium and advertised his services as a spiritual practitioner in magazines associated with Spiritualism. Like many Spiritualists of his era, he lectured in favor of the abolition of slavery; after emancipation, he taught literacy to freed slaves in New Orleans.

In addition to his work as a trance medium, Randolph trained as a doctor of medicine and wrote and published both fictional and instructive books based on his theories of health, sexuality, Spiritualism, and occultism. He wrote more than fifty works on magic and medicine, established an independent publishing company, and was an avid promoter of birth control during a time when it was largely against the law to mention this topic.

== Gilded Age movements ==
During the Gilded Age, the United States saw the rise of movements such as Theosophy, Christian Science, and the Jehovah's Witnesses.

=== Theosophy ===
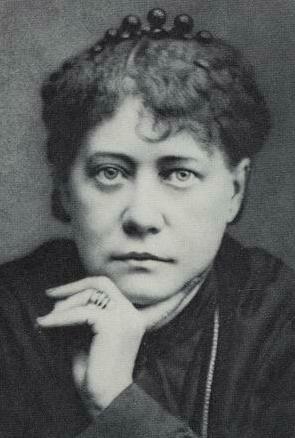
Blavatsky

In 1873, Russian immigrant Helena Blavatsky came to the United States and became involved in the Spiritualist movement, rising to public attention as a spirit medium. Blavatsky claimed to have encountered a group of spiritual adepts, the "Masters of the Ancient Wisdom", who sent her to Shigatse, Tibet, where they trained her to develop a deeper understanding of the synthesis of religion, philosophy, and science. Both contemporary critics and later biographers have argued that some or all of these foreign visits were fictitious and that she spent this period in Europe.

In 1875 New York City, Blavatsky co-founded the Theosophical Society; Blavatsky described Theosophy as "the synthesis of science, religion and philosophy", proclaiming that it was reviving an "Ancient Wisdom" which underlay all the world's religions. In 1877, she published Isis Unveiled, a book outlining her worldview. Associating it closely with the esoteric doctrines of Hermeticism and Neoplatonism, In 1880, she and Olcott moved to India, where the Society was allied to the Arya Samaj, a Hindu reform movement. That same year, while in Ceylon, she and Olcott became the first people from the United States to formally convert to Buddhism. Although opposed by the British colonial administration, Theosophy spread rapidly in India but experienced internal problems after Blavatsky was accused of producing fraudulent paranormal phenomena. Amid ailing health, in 1885 she returned to Europe, there establishing the Blavatsky Lodge in London. Here, she published The Secret Doctrine, a commentary on what she claimed were ancient Tibetan manuscripts, as well as two further books, The Key to Theosophy and The Voice of the Silence. She died of influenza.

=== Christian Science ===
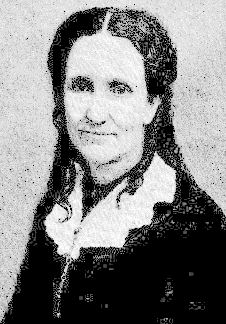
Eddy in 1871

In October 1862, Mary Baker Eddy became a patient of New Thought founder Phineas Quimby. From 1862 to 1865, Quimby and Eddy engaged in lengthy discussions about healing methods practiced by Quimby and others. Eddy gave Quimby much credit for his hypnotic treatments of her nervous and physical conditions and initially thought his brand of Mesmerism entirely benign.

Eddy served as a Spiritualist medium. Between 1866 and 1870, Eddy boarded at the home of Brene Paine Clark, who was interested in Spiritualism. Seances were often conducted there. In one of her Spiritualist trances, Eddy gave a message that supported Phineas Quimby, stating, "P. Quimby of Portland has the spiritual truth of diseases. You must imbibe it to be healed. Go to him again and lean on no material or spiritual medium."

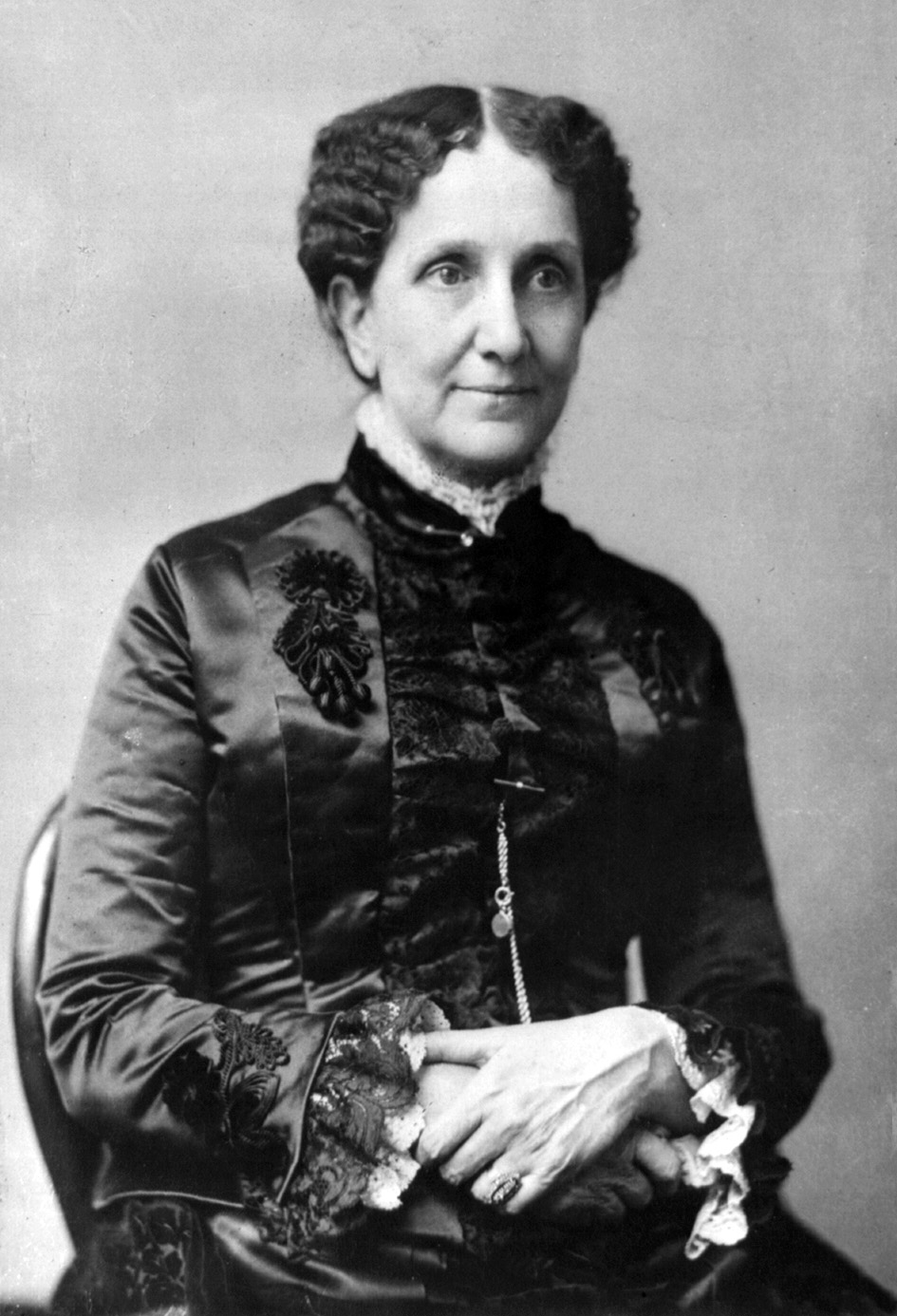
Eddy in the 1880s

In 1868, Eddy first advertised services as a healer in the Spiritualist paper The Banner of Light. During these years, Eddy carried a copy of one of Quimby's manuscripts giving an abstract of his philosophy. Eddy was reportedly still attending séances as late as 1872. In these later séances, Eddy would attempt to convert her audience into accepting Christian Science.

In 1875, Eddy self-published Science and Health with Key to the Scriptures, which she called the textbook of Christian Science. Eddy reported teaching at least 800 people. Science and Health contained testimonies of people who claimed to have been healed by reading her teachings. Eddy showed extensive familiarity with Spiritualist practice but denounced it in her Christian Science writings. Historian Ann Braude observed Eddy broke with Spiritualism in her assertion that spirit manifestations had never really had bodies to begin with, because matter is unreal and that all that really exists is spirit, before and after death.

In 1879, Eddy founded the Church of Christ, Scientist. At the height of the religion's popularity in 1936, a census counted c. 268,915 Christian Scientists in the United States (2,098 per million). There were an estimated 106,000 Christian Scientists in the United States in 1990 (427 per million). In 2009, the Church said that for the first time, more new members had been admitted from Africa than from the United States, though it offered no numbers.

=== Jehovah's Witnesses ===
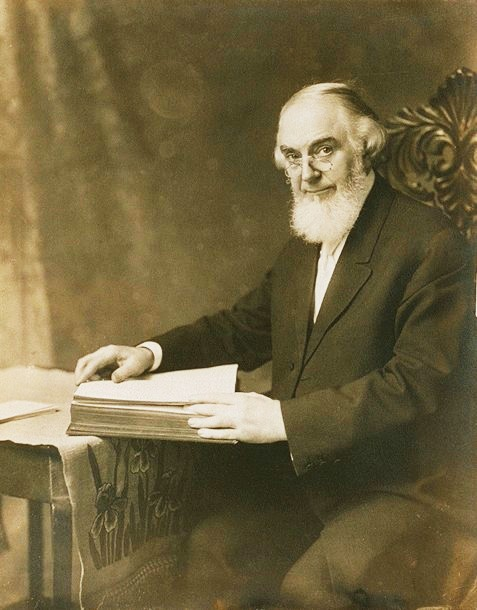
Charles Taze Russell

About 1870, Charles Taze Russell and his father established a group with a number of acquaintances to undertake an analytical study of the Bible and the origins of Christian doctrine, creed, and tradition. The group, strongly influenced by the writings of Millerite Adventist ministers George Storrs and George Stetson, who were also frequent attendees, concluded that many of the primary doctrines of the established churches, including the Trinity, hellfire, and inherent immortality of the soul, were not substantiated by the scriptures.

Around January 1876, Russell received a copy of Nelson Barbour's Herald of the Morning in the mail. Barbour was an influential Adventist writer and publisher. Russell telegraphed Barbour to set up a meeting. Barbour and John Henry Paton visited Allegheny in March 1876 at Russell's expense so that he could hear their arguments and compare each side's conclusions in their studies. Russell sponsored a speech by Barbour in St. George's Hall, Philadelphia, in August 1876 and attended other lectures by Barbour.

Among the teachings Barbour introduced was the view that Christians who had died would be raised in April 1878. Russell, who had previously rejected prophetic chronology, was moved to devote his life to what he was convinced were now the last two years before Christ's invisible, spiritual return. He sold his five clothing stores for approximately $300,000 (current value $9,070,000). With Russell's encouragement and financial backing, Barbour wrote an outline of their views in Three Worlds and the Harvest of This World, published in 1877. A text Russell had previously written, titled The Object and Manner of our Lord's Return, was published concurrently through the offices of the Herald of the Morning. Russell was eager to lead a Christian revival and called two separate meetings of Christian leaders in Pittsburgh. Russell's ideas were rejected both times, particularly stressing the imminence of the rapture and the second advent of Christ. When 1878 arrived, failure of the expected rapture brought great disappointment for Barbour and Russell, and their associates and readers.

Russell withdrew his financial support and started his own journal, Zion's Watch Tower and Herald of Christ's Presence, publishing his first issue in July 1879. Barbour formed The Church of the Strangers that same year, continuing to publish Herald of the Morning. In 1881, Russell founded Zion's Watch Tower Tract Society, with William Henry Conley as president and Russell as secretary-treasurer; they intended to disseminate tracts, papers, doctrinal treatises and Bibles. All materials were printed and bound by Russell's privately owned Tower Publishing Company for an agreed price, then distributed by colporteurs. The Society was incorporated in 1884, with Russell as president, and in 1886, its name was changed to Watch Tower Bible and Tract Society.

=== Ghost Dance movement ===
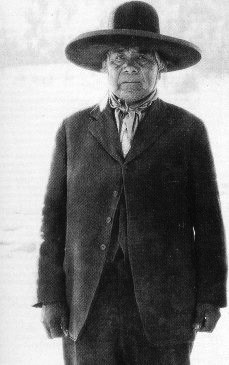
Wovoka

Wovoka claimed to have had a prophetic vision after falling into a coma (possibly due to scarlet fever) during the solar eclipse of January 1, 1889. Wovoka's vision entailed the resurrection of the Paiute dead, and the removal of whites and their works from North America. Wovoka taught that in order to bring this vision to pass, the Native Americans must live righteously and perform a traditional round dance known as the Ghost Dance.

Wovoka's prophetic message referenced a number of Christian theological concepts. In the "Messiah Letters", Wovoka spoke of Jesus Christ's life on Earth and likened the foretold redemption of Native Americans to a biblical Judgement Day. Wovoka made references to the reunion of the living and the dead, and also advocated for non-violence in the Christian spirit of pacifism and fair temperament. In its imagery and symbolism, the Ghost Dance embodied many of these Christian principles.

Anthropologists, historians, and theologians provide conflicting accounts of when and how Wovoka had his vision. One scholar of religions, Tom Thatcher, cites James Mooney's Smithsonian-sponsored anthropological report to claim that Wovoka received his first vision while chopping wood for David Wilson in 1887. Conversely, historian Paul Bailey utilized Mooney's work along with interviews with Wovoka's contemporaries and interpreters to assert that he received the vision after entering a two-day trance, awaking in tears. Regardless, shortly after receiving the vision and its message, it moved quickly beyond his local Paiute community by word of mouth to Native American tribes further east, notably the Lakota.

The Ghost Dance movement is known for being practiced by the victims of the Wounded Knee Massacre. Before the Ghost Dance reached Native Americans on South Dakota plains reservations, interest in the movement came from the U.S. Indian Office, U.S. War Department, and multiple Native American tribal delegations. As the movement spread across the American West, various interpretations of Wovoka's original message were adopted, notably by the Lakota Sioux living on the Pine Ridge reservation. The Lakota interpretation was considered more militant, placing additional emphasis on the foretold elimination of White men. Although the Lakota interpretation promoted hostility toward US federal agents, it did not explicitly advocate for violent action. Historical evidence suggests that the unconventional practice of Christianity on the part of the Lakota tribe was largely responsible for the tensions between Whites and Native Americans leading up to the Battle at Wounded Knee. US authorities challenged the theological views of the Ghost Dance movement and arguably sought conflict with the Lakota tribe as a means of condemning these practices. Wovoka never left his home in Nevada to become an active participant in the dance's dissemination in the U.S. interior.

Indian Agents, soldiers, and other federal officials tended to have a hostile and sometimes violent attitude toward the movement.

Wovoka was disheartened by how events unfolded at the massacre. He still remained a prominent Native American leader until his death. Sometime between 1894 and 1896, he was reported to have been a sideshow attraction at a San Francisco Midwinter Fair Carnival. In 1917, an agent for the Nevada Agency named L.A. Dorrington tracked down Wovoka to report his whereabouts to Washington. Curious to see if the former Native American messiah had ties to the Native American Church, Dorrington found that Wovoka was instead living a humble life in Mason. He abstained from the practice, worked as an occasional medicine man, and traveled to events on reservations across the United States.

Wovoka died in Yerington on September 20, 1932, and is interred in the Paiute Cemetery in the town of Schurz, Nevada.

== 20th-century movements ==
The 20th century saw the rise of such movements as Pentecostalism, Moorish Science, Nation of Islam, Positive Thinking, Scientology and Satanism.

=== Pentecostalism ===
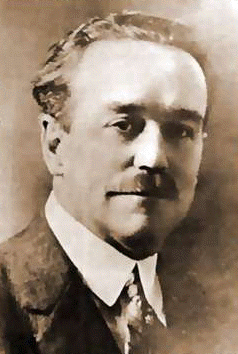
Charles Fox Parham

Charles Fox Parham started Bethel Bible College at Topeka in October 1900. The school was modeled on Sandford's "Holy Ghost and Us Bible School", and Parham continued to operate on a faith basis, charging no tuition. He invited "all ministers and Christians who were willing to forsake all, sell what they had, give it away, and enter the school for study and prayer". About 40 people (including dependents) responded. The only textbook was the Bible, and the teacher was the Holy Spirit (with Parham as a mouthpiece).

Prior to starting his Bible school, Parham had heard of at least one individual in Sandford's work who spoke in tongues and had reprinted the incident in his paper. He had also come to the conclusion that there was more to a full baptism than others acknowledged at the time. By the end of 1900, Parham had led his students at Bethel Bible School through his understanding that there had to be a further experience with God, but had not specifically pointed them to speaking in tongues. While Parham's account indicates that when classes were finished at the end of December, he left his students for a few days, asking them to study the Bible to determine what evidence was present when the early church received the Holy Spirit, this is not clear from the other accounts. The students had several days of prayer and worship, and held a New Year's Eve watchnight service at Bethel (December 31, 1900). The next evening (January 1, 1901) they also held a worship service, and it was that evening that Agnes Ozman felt impressed to ask to be prayed for to receive the fullness of the Holy Spirit. Immediately after being prayed for, she began to speak in what they referred to as "in tongues", speaking in what was believed to be a known language.

==== Azusa Street Revival ====
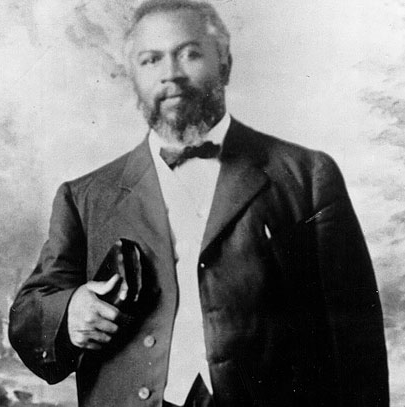
William J. Seymour, leader of the Azusa Street Revival

In 1905, William J. Seymour, the one-eyed 34-year-old son of freed slaves, was a student of well-known Pentecostal preacher Charles Parham and an interim pastor for a small holiness church in Topeka, Kansas.

In 1906, Seymour moved to Los Angeles, California, where he preached the Pentecostal message and sparked the Azusa Street Revival. The revival drew large crowds of believers as well as media coverage that focused on the controversial religious practices as well as the racially integrated worship services, which violated the racial norms of the time. Seymour's leadership of the revival and publication of The Apostolic Faith newspaper launched him into prominence within the young Pentecostal movement. Seymour broke with Parham in 1906 over theological differences as well as Parham's unhappiness with interracial revival meetings.

As the revival's influence extended beyond Los Angeles through evangelism and missionary work, Seymour was in the process of developing the revival into a larger organization called the Apostolic Faith Movement. This process was ultimately defeated by power struggles with other ministers, such as Florence Crawford and William Howard Durham, which ultimately damaged the unity of the early Pentecostal movement and led to a decrease in Seymour's influence. By 1914, the revival was past its peak, but Seymour continued to pastor the Apostolic Faith Mission he founded until his death. The revival acted as a catalyst for the spread of Pentecostal practices, such as speaking in tongues and integrated worship, throughout the world. It also played an important role in the history of most major Pentecostal denominations.

=== Moorish Science ===
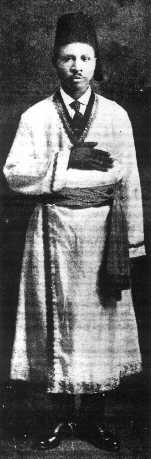
Noble Drew Ali

In 1913 Noble Drew Ali founded the Canaanite Temple in Newark, New Jersey, before relocating to Chicago, where he gained a following of thousands of converts.

Drew Ali taught that African Americans were all Moors, who he claimed were descended from the ancient Moabites (describing them as belonging to Northwest Africa as opposed to Moab as the name suggests). He claimed that Islam and its teachings are more beneficial to their earthly salvation, and that their 'true nature' had been 'withheld' from them. Male members of the Temple wear a fez or turban as head covering; women wear a turban.

As Drew Ali began urging the "Moorish-Americans" to become better citizens, he made speeches like, "A Divine Warning By the Prophet for the Nations", in which he urged them to reject derogatory labels, such as "Black", "colored", and "Negro". He urged Americans of all races to reject hate and embrace love. He believed that Chicago would become a second Mecca.

Drew Ali crafted Moorish Science ideology from a variety of sources, a "network of alternative spiritualities that focused on the power of the individual to bring about personal transformation through mystical knowledge of the divine within". In the interwar period in Chicago and other major cities, he used these concepts to preach Moorish pride. His approach appealed to thousands of African Americans who had left severely oppressive conditions in the South through the Great Migration and faced struggles adapting in new urban environments.

In early 1929, following a conflict over funds, Claude Green-Bey, the business manager of Chicago Temple No. 1 split from the Moorish Science Temple of America. He declared himself Grand Sheik and took a number of members with him. On March 15, Green-Bey was stabbed to death at the Unity Hall of the Moorish Science Temple, on Indiana Avenue in Chicago.

Drew Ali was out of town at the time, but upon his return to Chicago, Ali was arrested by police on suspicion of having instigated the killing. Shortly after his release by the police, Drew Ali died at age 43 at his home in Chicago on July 20, 1929. Although the exact circumstances of his death are unknown, the Certificate of Death stated that Noble Drew Ali died from "tuberculosis broncho-pneumonia". Despite the official report, many of his followers speculated that his death was caused by injuries from the police or from other members of the faith.

=== The Nation of Islam ===
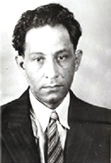
Fard in 1933

Wallace Fard Muhammad, acting as a door-to-door travelling salesman, spread his religious teachings throughout Detroit, and within three years grew the movement to a reported 8,000-9,000 members in Detroit, Chicago and other cities. Today, the Nation of Islam has an estimated membership of 20,000–50,000.

Fard taught a form of Black exceptionalism and self-pride to poor southern Blacks during the Great Northward Migration at a time when old ideas of scientific racism were prevalent. He advocated community members to establish and own their own businesses, eat healthy, raise families, and refrain from drugs and alcohol. He influenced his successor Elijah Muhammad, Malcolm X and many other black nationalist thinkers. Detractors accuse him of being a con man who used mystery and charisma to swindle poor Blacks by selling them new Muslim names and stirring up racial animosity.

=== Peale and the Power of Positive Thinking ===
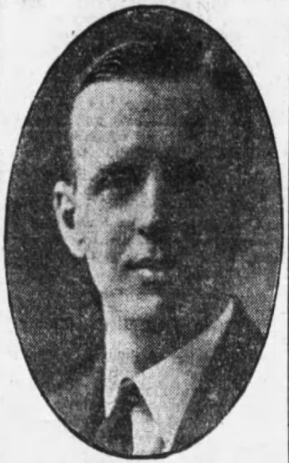
Norman Vincent Peale in 1924.

Norman Vincent Peale's father was a Methodist minister, and in 1922, Peale was himself ordained as a Methodist minister, preaching in his father's church. In 1932, Peale changed his religious affiliation to the Reformed Church in America and began serving as pastor of Marble Collegiate Church in New York City.

In 1952, Peale published his most popular work The Power of Positive Thinking, a spiritual self-help book. Peale has been described as a member of the New Thought movement.

Peale was highly-influential, receiving praise from several presidents (Nixon, Ford, Carter, Reagan, H.W. Bush, Clinton and Trump spoke well of Peale).

=== Edgar Cayce ===
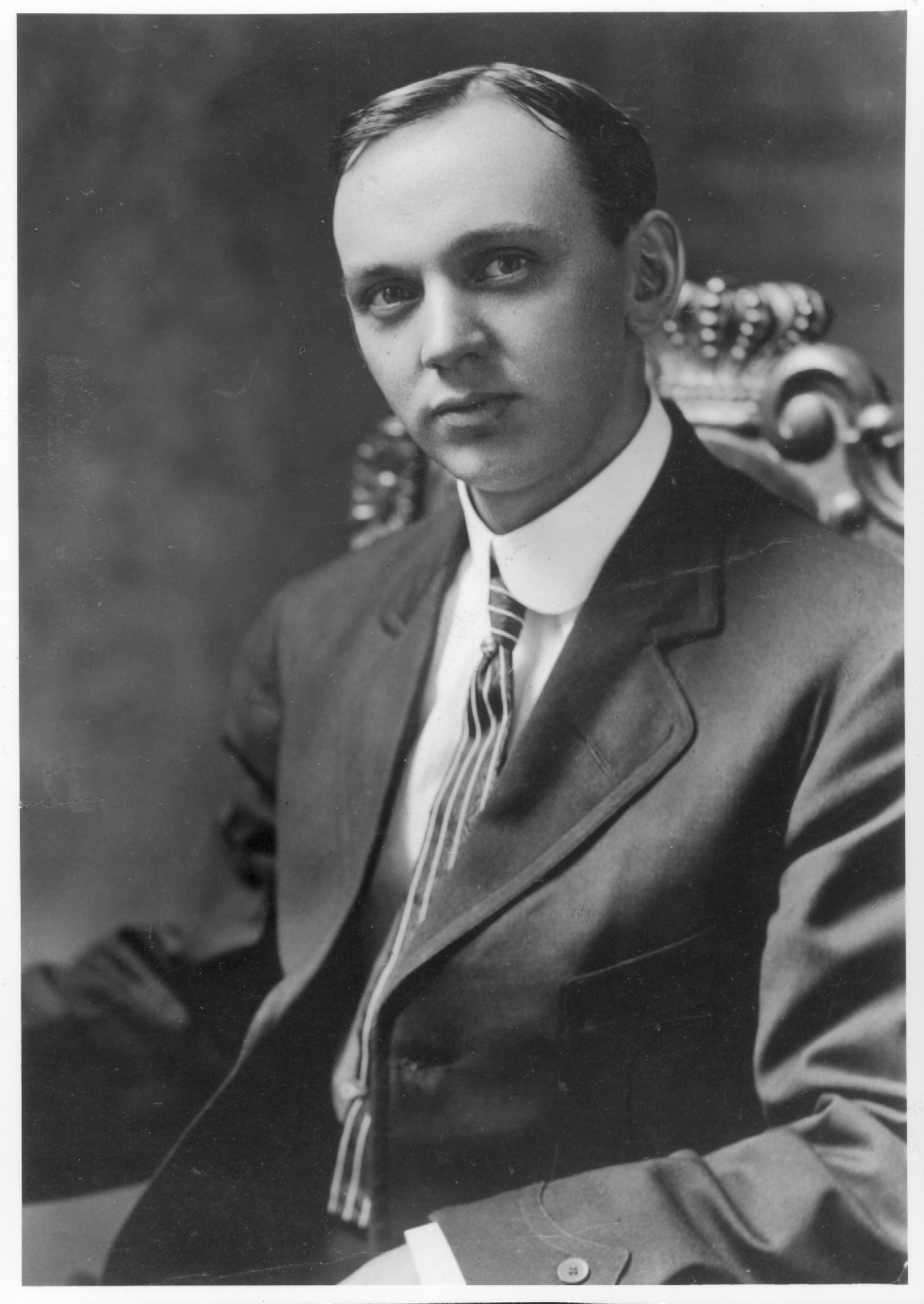
Medical clairvoyant Edgar Cayce in 1910

In 1902, Edgar Cayce of Hopkinsville, Kentucky reported his ability to speak had been restored by a local hypnotist. Cayce performed as a medical clairvoyant, purporting to enter a trance to provide medical diagnoses and treatments. Along with Christianity and early psychology, Cayce incorporated concepts from Blavatksy's Theosophy, including reincarnation theories of Atlantis, and root races. While insisting he was not a spiritualist, Cayce purported to enter a trance where he would provide psychic readings to correspondents.

=== Scientology ===
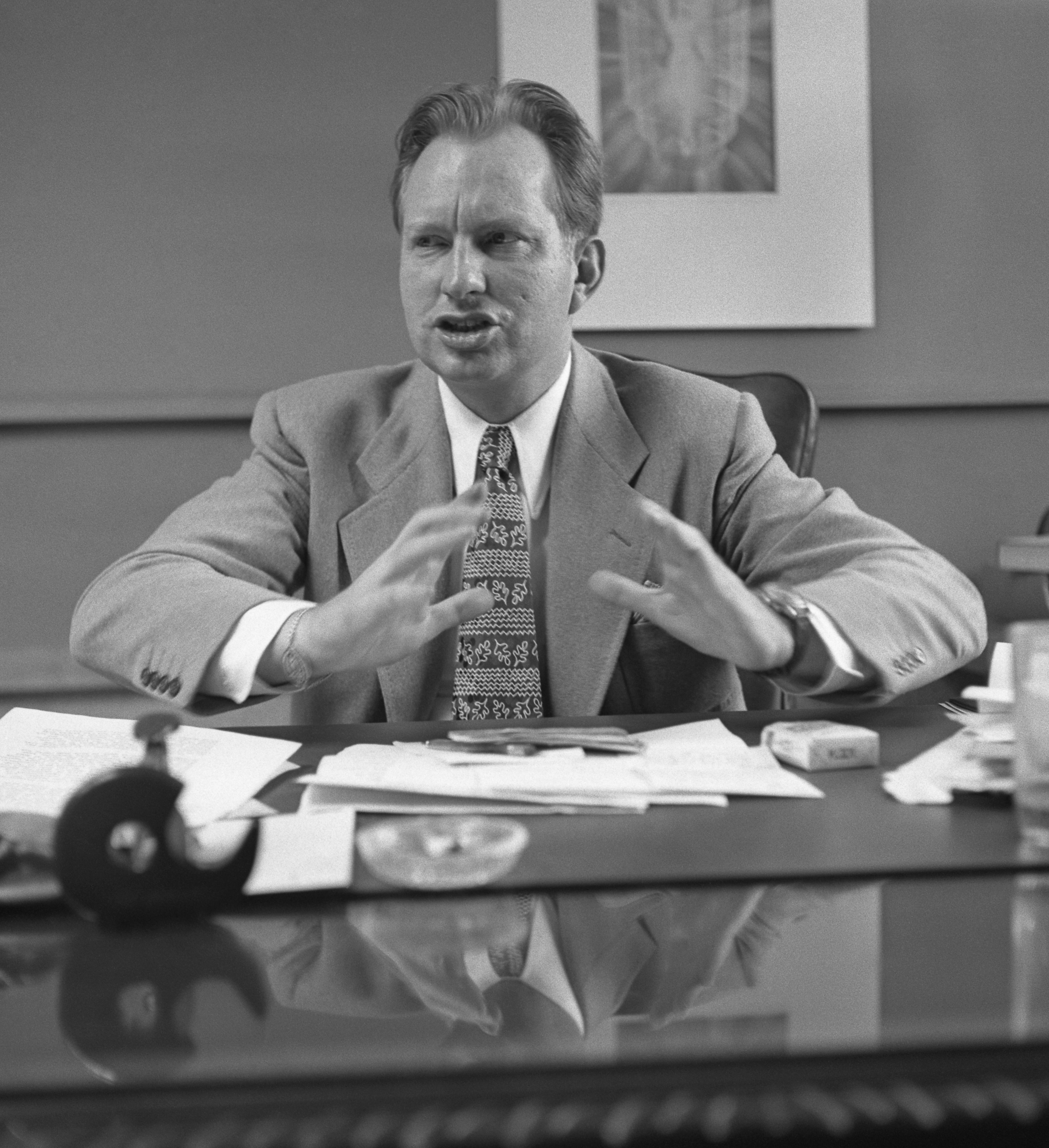
L. Ron Hubbard in 1950

In 1938, pulp fiction author L. Ron Hubbard underwent a dental procedure in which he was administered a gas; during the procedure, he had an experience that he interpreted as a revelatory near-death experience. In August 1945, Hubbard moved into the Pasadena mansion of occultist John "Jack" Whiteside Parsons, follower of the English ceremonial magician Aleister Crowley and leader of a lodge of Crowley's magical order, Ordo Templi Orientis (OTO). Hubbard befriended Parsons and soon became sexually involved with Parsons's 21-year-old girlfriend, Sara "Betty" Northrup. The two men collaborated on the "Babalon Working", a sex magic ritual intended to summon an incarnation of Babalon, the supreme Thelemite Goddess. It was undertaken over several nights in February and March 1946 in order to summon an "elemental" who would participate in further sex magic.

Hubbard received a revelation that Parsons should fund a business partnership, "Allied Enterprises" which called for Hubbard and Sara to buy yachts in Miami and sail them to the West Coast to sell for a profit. Aleister Crowley strongly criticized Parsons's actions, writing: "Suspect Ron playing confidence trick—Jack Parsons weak fool—obvious victim prowling swindlers." Parsons was "shattered" and had to sell his mansion to developers soon afterward. On August 10, 1946, Hubbard married Sara (though he was not yet legally divorced).

In October 1947 he wrote to request psychiatric treatment:

After trying and failing for two years to regain my equilibrium in civil life, I am utterly unable to approach anything like my own competence. My last physician informed me that it might be very helpful if I were to be examined and perhaps treated psychiatrically or even by a psychoanalyst. Toward the end of my service I avoided out of pride any mental examinations, hoping that time would balance a mind which I had every reason to suppose was seriously affected. I cannot account for nor rise above long periods of moroseness and suicidal inclinations, and have newly come to realize that I must first triumph above this before I can hope to rehabilitate myself at all. ... I cannot, myself, afford such treatment.
Would you please help me?

Beginning in June 1948, the nationally syndicated wire service United Press ran a story on an American Legion-sponsored psychiatric ward in Savannah, Georgia which sought to keep mentally-ill war veterans out of jail. That summer, Hubbard was arrested by the San Louis Obispo sheriff on a charge of petty theft for passing a fraudulent check. In late 1948, Hubbard moved to Savannah, where he would later claim to have worked as a volunteer in the psychiatric clinic, where he claimed he "processed an awful lot of Negroes".

In May 1950, Hubbard published Dianetics: The Modern Science of Mental Health, which claimed that the source of all psychological pain, and therefore the cause of mental and physical health problems, was a form of memory known as "engrams". According to Hubbard, individuals could reach a state he named "Clear" in which a person was freed of these engrams. This would be done by talking with an "auditor".

Dianetics was an immediate commercial success and sparked what Martin Gardner calls "a nationwide cult of incredible proportions". Following the prosecution of Hubbard's foundation for teaching medicine without a license and Hubbard's loss of the rights to Dianetics, in 1953 Hubbard rebranded as Scientology, an explicitly religious movement.

After prosecutions in the United States and in the United Kingdom, Hubbard largely lived aboard a ship from 1967 to 1975. During that period, Hubbard instigated a massive infiltration of the US government with over 5,000 covert agents involved; upon discovering the plot in 1977, the FBI conducted simultaneous raids of Hubbard's organizations and multiple high-level Scientologists including Hubbard's wife were convicted and imprisoned for their role in the infiltration. Hubbard remained in hiding the rest of his life, ultimately dying in a motorhome near Creston, California on January 24, 1986.

=== Satanism ===
Anton LaVey became a local celebrity in San Francisco through his paranormal research and live performances as an organist. He was also a publicly noticeable figure; he drove a coroner's van around town, and he walked his pet black leopard, named Zoltan. LaVey formed a group called the Order of the Trapezoid, which later evolved into the governing body of the Church of Satan. According to Faxneld and Petersen, the Church of Satan represented "the first public, highly visible, and long-lasting organisation which propounded a coherent Satanic discourse".

LaVey began presenting Friday night lectures on the occult and rituals. A member of this circle suggested that he had the basis for a new religion. According to LaVey himself, on Walpurgisnacht, April 30, 1966, he ritualistically shaved his head, allegedly "in the tradition of ancient executioners", declared the founding of the Church of Satan and proclaimed 1966 as "the Year One", Anno Satanas—the first year of the Age of Satan (it was later demonstrated that LaVey in fact shaved his head because he lost a bet and made up the "ancient executioners" story after the fact). LaVey's image has been described as "Mephistophelean", and may have been inspired by an occult-themed episode of the television show The Wild Wild West titled "The Night of the Druid's Blood" which originally aired on March 25, 1966, and starred Don Rickles as the evil magician and Satanic cult leader Asmodeus, whose Mephistophelean persona is virtually identical to that which LaVey adopted one month later.

== See also ==
- Methodism – Denomination of Protestant Christianity
- Jewish Science – Judaic spiritual movement
- Modern paganism – Religions shaped by historical paganism
- UFO religion – Religion which includes beliefs about aliens
- Hare Krishna movement – Hindu religious organisation
- Transcendental Meditation movement – Movement promoting meditation technique
- Rajneesh movement – Persons inspired by the Indian mystic Osho
- New religious movement – Religious community or spiritual group of modern origin
- Unification Church of the United States – New religious movement
- St. John Coltrane African Orthodox Church – Church in San Francisco
