= Reuben Swinburne Clymer =

American occultist (1878–1966)

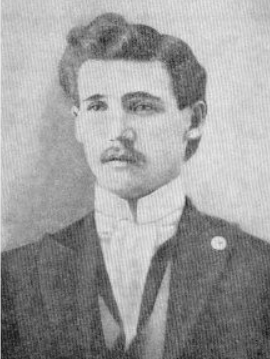
- Born: November 25, 1878; Quakertown, Pennsylvania, United States
- Died: June 3, 1966 (aged 87)
- Occupations: Osteopath, author, publisher
- Known for: Reviving or creating the Fraternitas Rosae Crucis
- Children: Emerson M. Clymer

Reuben Swinburne Clymer (November 25, 1878 - June 3, 1966) was an American occultist and modern Rosicrucian Supreme Grand Master of the FRC (Fraternitas Rosae Crucis), perhaps the oldest continuing Rosicrucian organization in the Americas. He practiced alternative medicine, and wrote and published works on it as well as (his version of) the teachings of Paschal Beverly Randolph (1825-1875), alchemy, nutrition, religion, sex magic and spiritualism. This led to a number of conflicts with Harvey Spencer Lewis (1883-1939) and the AMORC (Ancient Mystical Order Rosae Crucis), FUDOSI, Aleister Crowley, and even the American Medical Association.

== Life ==
Clymer was born in Quakertown, Pennsylvania. He studied medicine in Chicago, Illinois, and registered as an osteopath in New York in 1910. His work with alternative medicine regularly brought him into trouble with the United States government and the American Medical Association (AMA). Clymer was investigated by the AMA's Journal Bureau of Investigation in 1923. They commented that "our records fail to show that this man ever regularly graduated by any reputable medical college." Clymer was listed as a graduate of the "Independent Medical College" in Chicago, 1898. However, this was a diploma mill which sold diplomas to anyone.

Clymer operated the "International Academy of the Natural and Sacred Science" from Union City, Michigan, which offered a course in the "Natural System of Healing". This was a mail-order scheme and the degrees "M.D. and "D.O." were sold. Clymer was also involved with a school known as "The Philosophers of the Living Fire" which offered a mail-order scheme to obtain bogus degrees. A fraud order was issued by the United States postal authorities against the school "for obtaining additional sums of money from credulous persons."

As an osteopath, he opposed vaccination, and claimed that meat was the primary cause of cancer, and (especially when combined with beans, bread, potatoes, and beer) immorality and insanity.

Clymer promoted a pescatarian diet. He opposed the consumption of red meat which he believed was toxic. In 1917, The Rose Cross Aid Cook Book was authored by Clara Witt which conformed to the dietary advice of Clymer and reflected Rosicrucian theology. In 1919, Clymer authored Diet: The Way to Health. He commented that "Meat, of any nature, is entirely unnecessary for either the maintenance of health or for the restoration to health of those who have become weak and ill. Fish and other sea food, milk and other dairy products, and eggs, will take the place of meat, and these do not contain the unhealthy ingredients or the acids and toxins contained in meat."

=== Randolph and the FRC ===
Clymer joined the FRC in 1897, becoming a grand master of it in 1905 at age 27.

In either 1900 or 1904, Clymer got into publishing with his Philosophical Publishing Company, which he used to keep Paschal Beverly Randolph's books in print well into the 20th century. Clymer was deeply influenced by Randolph, of whom he created a hagiographic (and mostly fictitious) history. Clymer claimed that his occult orders were founded by Randolph (although many were completely unrelated), tying their already mostly fictional histories together under Randolph, particularly the Hermetic Brotherhood of Light orders in Quakertown.

Clymer created a more consistent and palatable belief system from Randolph's thoughts, cleaning up the problematic sex magic practices Randolph espoused at times, as well as Randolph's self-contradictions on numerous points. The pseudo-history assembled by Clymer cast Randolph as the legitimate heir of an ancient Rosicrucian tradition in America. This was accomplished by turning many people Randolph mentioned running into members of various occult organizations secretly connected to ancient Egyptian Rosicrucians, known members into masters of groups they were members of, and an unknown young man who met Eliphas Levi into none other than a young Randolph. If Clymer lacked a starting point or could not fill a plot hole, he claimed that such gaps were the result of the destruction of records by enemies of Randolph's (and Clymer's) Fraternitas. In addition to the standard claims of Western Occultism of ties to famous Neoplatonists, alchemists, magicians, Clymer also connected Randolph's "order" to Abraham Lincoln, Napoleon III, Alexandre Saint-Yves d'Alveydre, Papus, Albert Pike, and the Count of St. Germain. Although Clymer apparently believed his biography of Randolph to be absolutely historical, it is understood now to be largely fictitious.

According to Clymer, Randolph founded the FRC in 1858, with control passing onto Freeman Dowd in 1875, then Edward Brown in 1907, then Clymer in 1922. Unlike a number of fraternal orders (particularly the Shriners), Clymer explicitly denied that Rosicrucians had any special ornamentation or jewelry. As a result, the FRC is noted for its lack of self-promotion and advertising.

Other organizations founded by Clymer include the Church of Illumination, the College of the Holy Grail, and the Sons of Isis and Osiris. The Church of Illumination serves as an outer body for the FRC, spreading its teachings under the name of "Divine Law" in hopes of bringing about a new era through symbolic alchemy.

=== Rivalry with Harvey Spencer Lewis and AMORC ===
Clymer's claim to being the true leader of American Rosicrucianism put Clymer in direct competition with Harvey Spencer Lewis, founder of the AMORC (Ancient Mystical Order Rosae Crucis). This competition was turned to bitter rivalry thanks to disagreement on the role of sex in magic, both sides accusing the other of perverse teachings; while holding that the sexual practices they themselves advocated were enlightened and pure. Clymer's views, largely lifted from Randolph, were that bodily fluids produced by a married couple needed to be regularly exchanged for the physical and spiritual health of each partner.

Clymer and Lewis competed for the attention of different national branches of the OTO (Ordo Templi Orientis) for official ties, with both finding comparable success and neither being able to use their ties to the O.T.O. to claim legitimacy over the other. When Lewis co-founded FUDOSI (which recognized Lewis's AMORC as the true heirs of American Rosicrucianism), Clymer co-founded FUDOFSI with Constant Chevillon and Jean Bricaud (which favored Clymer's FRC), and claimed that Lewis's FUDOSI was a failed and mistaken grab at legitimization. In response to these attacks, AMORC published material calling Clymer's ideas "some of the weirdest notions that a human mind ever harboured," further pointing out that his positions were "self-appointed and self-devised." Clymer retaliated by raising suspicion about Lewis's doctorate, accusing Lewis of hocking inauthentic works, and (due to Lewis's association with Aleister Crowley) practicing black magic. Crowley initially responded by offering to help Lewis fight Clymer, though Crowley's later attempt to claim control of Lewis's AMORC resulted in a rift between them.

The American rivalry eventually created a rift in European Rosicrucianism as well.

=== Later life ===
By 1939, Lewis's death and legal attacks by the American Medical Association brought the rivalry between Clymer and AMORC to an end. Clymer continued to practice alternative medicine and lead the FRC until his death in 1966, when he was succeeded by his son Emerson Myron Clymer (October 16, 1909 - October 4, 1983).

== Writings ==
Clymer's more popular writings include A Compendium of Occult Law, Mysteries of Osiris, and The Rosicrucian Fraternity in America (2 vols., 1935-1936). The Rosicrucian Fraternity in America, with emphasis on a single fraternity, was an attack on AMORC and Lewis.

He also translated some works of Ludovico Maria Sinistrari, though changing Sinistrari's incubi and succubi to elementals and suggesting that the virgin birth of Jesus was the result of a Salamander impregnating Mary.

Clymer wrote books on nutrition (such as Dietetics and Diet, the Way to Health), as well as authorizing a Rose Cross Aid cookbook. In 1904, he wrote an anti-vaccinationist pamphlet titled Vaccination Brought Home to You, which documented two cases of children's bad reactions to vaccines. A review by the Cleveland Medical and Surgical Reporter noted that "the statements of the author are made so manifestly from the stand-point of rank prejudice that they do not deserve the name of arguments."

== Legacy ==
Clymer's involvement in new religious movements, the drama that invariably followed Clymer and similar leaders (such as Father Divine), inspired a number of early 20th century detective stories, such as Dashiell Hammett's The Dain Curse.

Clymer's works are also standard reading for American Rosicrucians, and his interest in medicine is continued by the FRC to this day, with the Beverly Hall headquarters housing chiropractic and naturopathic clinics. His prolific writing about Paschal Beverly Randolph and his teachings remain influential in the study of Randolph, in part because little is known about Randolph.

== Selected publications ==
- The Thomsonian System of Medicine (1905)
- True Spiritualism (1906)
- The Philosophy of Fire (1907)
- The Gods (1910)
- Christisis (1911)
- The Illuminated Faith (1913)
- The Way to Life and Immortality (1914)
- The Rose Cross Order (1916)
- The Rose Cross Aid Cook Book (Clara Witt, authorized by R. Swinburne Clymer, 1917)
- Making Health Certain (1921)
- The Divine Law (1922)
- The Rosicrucians (1928)
- Manual, Order of Service and Ritual (1952)
