= Fraternitatis Rosae Crucis =

Fraternitatis Rosae Crucis may refer to:

- Ancient Mystical Order Rosae Crucis
- Fraternitas Rosae Crucis
- Rosicrucian
