= FUDOFSI =

Federation of independent esoteric orders

FUDOFSI (French: Fédération Universelle des Ordres, Fraternités et Sociétés Initiatiques), headed by Constant Chevillon (1880–1944), was a federation of independent esoteric orders similar to FUDOSI, but strongly opposed to the other group.

== History ==
FUDOFSI was established in defense of the Orders of Lyon and other societies that were not involved with FUDOSI. FUDOFSI was strongly opposed to FUDOSI, Harvey Spencer Lewis and his organisation Ancient Mystical Order Rosae Crucis (AMORC). Very little information is known about FUDOFSI since neither the organisation or its leader survived the Second World War (in 1944, Constant Chevillon, the head of FUDOFSI, was murdered by the Gestapo).

== Organisations represented in the first convention of 1939 ==
- Ancient and Primitive Rite of Memphis-Misraïm
- Brotherhood of the Illumined Brethren of the Rose-Croix
- Eglise Gnostique Universelle
- Fraternitas Rosae Crucis
- Fraternitas Rosicruciana Antiqua
- Order of Knight Masons Elus Cohen of the Universe
- Ordre de Saint Graal
- Ordre Kabbalistique De La Rose Croix
- Ordre Martiniste-Martineziste de Lyon
- Rite Ecossais Rectifie

== Dissolution ==
FUDOFSI ceased to exist at some point during World War II. However, in 1947 some of its members contacted each other and tried to establish a new organisation. Hans-Rudolf Hilfiker and R. Swinburne Clymer (1878–1966) tried to create a Worldwide Alliance of Rosicrucian Orders. In Rio de Janeiro, Clymer successfully merged his organisation with Krumm-Heller's. Hilfiker and Clymer had a meeting on May 7, 1947 and also on June 5, 1948, in Zürich, Switzerland at the hotel Baur au Lac. The Fraternitas Rosae Crucis official biography of Emerson Myron Clymer, son of R. S. Clymer, describes him as Supreme Grand Master of FUDOFSI after his father's death, so it is possible that the Fraternitas Rosae Crucis considers FUDOFSI to have survived later.

== See also ==
- Freemasonry
- Mysticism
- Occultism
- Rosicrucianism
