= Émile Dantinne =

Belgian philosopher and esotericist

Émile Dantinne (19 April 1884 in Huy – 21 May 1969) was a Belgian philosopher and esotericist.

Member, then leader of several esoteric societies based in Belgium such as 'La Rose+Croix Universitaire' and 'L'Ordre d'Hermès Tétramégiste', he founded in 1934 the F.U.D.O.S.I., or 'Fédération Universelle Des Ordres et Sociétés Initiatiques' (Universal Federation of Initiatic Orders and Societies). By that time he had adopted the esoteric name of Sâr Hieronymus.

The main Esoteric Order in the F.U.D.O.S.I. was the Ancient and Mystical Order Rosae Crucis also known as A.M.O.R.C., to which Dantinne belonged since the days of his friendship with Grand Master Joséphin Péladan. Dantinne was never a member of AMORC. Neither was Josephin Peladan. The latter was the founder and Grand Master of the Ordre Rose+Croix Catholique. Dantinne was an enthusiastic disciple of Peladan and inherited the mantle of Imperator of the OR+CC when Peladan died, changing its name to the Ordre Rose+Croix Universelle. Dantinne spoke several languages, among which Italian, Portuguese, Russian, Latin and Ancient Greek. He also was an accomplished writer. During his lifetime he published over 30 titles concerning topics such as foreign languages, local history, metaphysics, occultism etc.
