= Paschal Beverly Randolph =

American physician, occultist and writer (1825–1875)

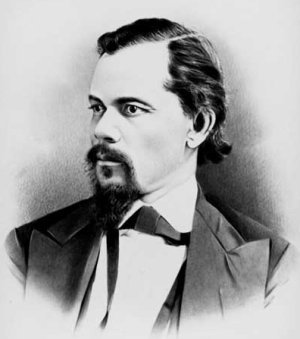
- Born: October 8, 1825; New York City, U.S.
- Died: July 29, 1875 (aged 49); Toledo, Ohio, U.S.
- Spouse(s): Mary Jane Randolph (m. 1850; div. 1864); Kate Corson (?–1875)

Paschal Beverly Randolph (October 8, 1825 – July 29, 1875) was an African-American medical doctor, occultist, spiritualist, trance medium, and writer. According to A. E. Waite, he established the earliest known Rosicrucian order in the United States in his founding of the Fraternitas Rosae Crucis. He may have also been the first to introduce the principles of erotic alchemy to North America.

== Early life ==
Born in New York City, Randolph grew up in New York City and was baptized at the Church of the Transfiguration, Episcopal (Manhattan). He was a free black man, a descendant of William Randolph. His father was a nephew of John Randolph of Roanoke and his mother was Flora Beverly, whom he later described as being of mixed English, French, German, Native American and African ancestry. His mother died when he was young, leaving him homeless and penniless; he ran away to sea in order to support himself. From his adolescence through to the age of twenty, he worked as a sailor.

As a teen and young man, Randolph traveled widely, due to his work aboard sailing vessels. He journeyed to England, through Europe, and as far east as Persia, where his interest in mysticism and the occult led him to study with local practitioners of folk magic and various religions. On these travels he also met and befriended occultists in England and Paris, France.

== Career ==
Returning to New York City in September 1855, after "a long tour in Europe and Africa", he gave a public lecture to African Americans on the subject of emigrating to India. Randolph believed that "the Negro is destined to extinction" in the United States.

After leaving the sea, Randolph embarked upon a public career as a lecturer and writer. By his mid-twenties, he regularly appeared on stage as a trance medium and advertised his services as a spiritual practitioner in magazines associated with Spiritualism. Like many Spiritualists of his era, he lectured in favor of the abolition of slavery; after emancipation, he taught literacy to freed slaves in New Orleans.

In addition to his work as a trance medium, Randolph trained as a doctor of medicine and wrote and published both fictional and instructive books based on his theories of health, sexuality, Spiritualism and occultism. He wrote more than fifty works on magic and medicine, established an independent publishing company, and was an avid promoter of birth control during a time when it was largely against the law to mention this topic. Randolph was also a significant importer of hashish, which he considered to have both medical and spiritual properties.

Having long used the pseudonym "The Rosicrucian" for his Spiritualist and occult writings, Randolph eventually founded the Fraternitas Rosae Crucis in 1858, and their first lodge in San Francisco in 1861, the oldest Rosicrucian organization in the United States. This group, still in existence, today avoids mention of Randolph's interest in sex magic, but his magico-sexual theories and techniques formed the basis of much of the teachings of another occult fraternity, the Hermetic Brotherhood of Luxor, although it is not clear that Randolph himself was ever personally associated with the Brotherhood.

== Belief and teaching ==
Randolph described himself as a Rosicrucian. He had worked "largely alone", producing "his own synthesis" of "esoteric teachings".

=== Sex and gender ===
The manner in which Randolph incorporated sex into his occult system was considered uncharacteristically bold for the period in which he lived. He believed that sex magic could lead to increased health, love, the empowerment of women, and children of superior intelligence. In his more underground publications, he wrote that church and marriage were oppressive forces that could be overthrown with the power of love in a world-wide revolution.

Randolph held an unusually expansive view of gender identity, considering earthly gender to be "provisional", and referring to God as both male and female. In a book on love he wrote:

I believe in love, all the way through. And while I live will help every man, woman, and the betweenities to win, obtain, intensify, deepen, purify, strengthen and keep it, and I will help all others to do the same. There! That's me! I mean it!

In the spirit world that Randolph wrote of in elaborate detail, human bodies are filled with electric current instead of blood and saliva. People move by magnetism. They have art, schools, and cities as terrestrial humans do, but their lives are more enjoyable and sex is better. Spirit-world marriages "last just so long as the parties thereto are agreeably and mutually pleased with, and attracted, to each other, and no longer"

=== Pre-Adamism ===
Randolph was a believer in pre-Adamism (the belief that humans existed on earth before the biblical Adam) and wrote the book Pre-Adamite Man: demonstrating the existence of the human race upon the earth 100,000 thousand years ago! under the name of Griffin Lee in 1863. His book was a unique contribution towards pre-Adamism because it wasn't strictly based on biblical grounds. Randolph used a wide range of sources to write his book from many different world traditions, esoterica and ancient religions. Randolph traveled to many countries of the world where he wrote different parts of his book. In the book he claims that Adam was not the first man and that pre-Adamite men existed on all continents around the globe 35,000 years to 100,000 years ago. His book was different from many of the other writings from other pre-Adamite authors because in Randolph's book he claims the pre-Adamites were civilized men while other pre-Adamite authors argued that the pre-Adamites were beasts or hominids.

== Personal life ==
Randolph lived in many places, including New York State, New Orleans, San Francisco, and Toledo. He married his first wife, Mary Jane, in 1850; she was African (or possibly mixed-race). Together, they had three children, only one of whom (Cora, born 1854) survived to adulthood. They owned a farm in Stockbridge, New York during the 1850s, but sold it in April 1860 for one dollar. They later lived in Utica, New York, where Mary Jane worked as "a healer and dispenser of Native american remedies", in addition to helping Paschal publish and sell several books. They divorced in January 1864.

Later in life he married his second wife, Kate Corson, an Irish-American woman, with whom he had one child, Osiris Budh (or Buddha) Randolph (1874–1929). Corson acted as a medium and a seer in collaboration with Randolph, and published several of his books, but their relationship appears to have been conflicted for its duration. He is reported to have discovered that she was having an affair shortly before his apparent death by suicide in 1875. After his death, Corson continued publishing his works under the Randolph Publishing Company imprint until the early 1900s.

== Death ==
Randolph died in Toledo, Ohio, at the age of 49, under disputed circumstances. According to biographer Carl Edwin Lindgren, many questioned the newspaper article "By His Own Hand" that appeared in The Toledo Daily Blade. According to this article, Randolph had died from a self-inflicted wound to the head. However, many of his writings express his aversion to suicide. R. Swinburne Clymer, a later Supreme Master of the Fraternitas, stated that years after Randolph's demise, in a death-bed confession, a former friend of Randolph had conceded that in a state of jealousy and temporary insanity, he had killed Randolph. Lucus County Probate Court records list the death as accidental. Randolph was succeeded as Supreme Grand Master of the Fraternitas, and in other titles, by his chosen successor Freeman B. Dowd. (Note: Dowd introduced some of Randolph's ideas into the New Thought Movement. He was a member of the Hermetic Brotherhood of Luxor.)

After his death Frances H. McDougall and Luna Hutchinson, two spiritualist mediums, published a book purportedly written by Randolph through channelling titled Beyond the Veil.

== Influence and legacy ==
Randolph influenced both the Theosophical Society and—to a greater degree—the Hermetic Brotherhood of Luxor. Randolph's sex magic ideas influenced Aleister Crowley and the Ordo Templi Orientis, although they differed from Randolph in application, such as not limiting the practice to married couples only.

In 1994, the historian Joscelyn Godwin noted that Randolph had been largely neglected by historians of esotericism. In 1997, a biography was published, Paschal Beverly Randolph: A Nineteenth-Century Black American Spiritualist, Rosicrucian, and Sex Magician by John Patrick Deveney, with a forward by Franklin Rosemont.

== Published works ==
- Waa-gu-Mah (1854)
- Lara (1859)
- Dhoula Bel, or The Magic Globe (1859-1860)
- The Grand Secret (1860)
- The Unveiling (1860)
- Dealings with the dead; (copy 2) (1861)
- Human Love (1861)
- Dealing with the Dead (1861)
- Pre-Adamite Man (1863, under the pseudonym "Griffin Lee")
- The Wonderful Story of Ravalette. (1863)
- Tom Clark and his Wife, their double dreams, and the curious things that befell them therein; being "The Rosicrucian's Story". (1863)
- A Sad Case; A Great Wrong! (1866, anonymous publication)
- After death; or, Disembodied man (1866)
- "Clairvoyance, How to Produce It", Guide to Clairvoyance (1867)
- After death; or, Disembodied man (1868)
- Seership! The Magnetic Mirror (1870)
- Love and Its Hidden History (1869, under the pseudonym "Count de St. Leon")
- Love and the Master Passion (1870)
- The Evils of the Tobacco Habit (1872)
- The New Mola! The Secret of Mediumship (1873)
- Love, Woman, and Marriage (1874)
- Eulis!: The History of Love (1874)
- The Book of the Triplicate Order (1875)
- Magia Sexualis: Sexual Practices for Magical Power (published posthumously)

Randolph also wrote for occult periodicals. He edited the Leader (Boston) and the Messenger of Light (New York) between 1852 and 1861, and wrote for the Journal of Progress and Spiritual Telegraph.

Also attributed to Randolph is Affectional Alchemy and How It Works (c. 1870) and Beyond the Veil (1878) by Frances H. McDougall and Luna Hutchinson.

== Bibliography ==
- Bennett, Chris (November 12, 2016). "The Hidden Hash Master of the 19th Century: Paschal Beverly Randolph". Cannabis Culture.
- Chappell, Vere (2010). Sexual Outlaw, Erotic Mystic: The Essential Ida Craddock. Weiser Books.
- Cohen, Lara Langer (February 8, 2023). "The Emancipatory Visions of a Sex Magician: Paschal Beverly Randolph's Occult Politics". The Public Domain Review.
- Deveney, John Patrick (1997). Paschal Beverly Randolph: A Nineteenth-Century Black American Spiritualist, Rosicrucian, and Sex Magician. State University of New York Press. ISBN 0-7914-3120-7.
- Deveney, John Patrick (2015). "Man is a Spirit Here and Now: The Two Faces of Nineteenth-Century Spiritualism and the Creation of the Magical Occult Theosophical Spiritualist New Thought Amalgam". In Guttierez, Cathy (ed.). Handbook of Spiritualism and Channeling. Brill. pp. 117–151.
- Godwin, Jocelyn (1994). Theosophical Enlightenment. State University of New York Press. ISBN 9781438404226.
- Godwin, Jocelyn; Chanel, Christian; Deveney, John Patrick (1995). The Hermetic Brotherhood of Luxor: Initiatic and Historical Documents of an Order of Practical Occultism. Samuel Weiser. ISBN 0-87728-825-9.
- Godwin, Joscelyn (2015). Upstate Cauldron: Eccentric Spiritual Movements in Early New York State. Excelsior Editions. ISBN 978-1-4384-5595-2.
- Hall, Timothy L. (2003). American Religious Leaders. Facts on File, Incorporated. ISBN 978-1-4381-0806-3.
- Lindgren, Carl Edwin (1996). "The Rose Cross in America". The Rose Cross. Ars Latomorum Publications. pp. 27–32.
- Lindgren, Carl Edwin (1999). "Randolph, Paschal Beverly". American National Biography. Archived from the original on September 8, 2006.
- Mcdougall, Frances H.; Hutchinson, Luna (1878). Beyond the Veil: Posthumous Work of Paschal Beverly Randolph, Aided by Emanuel Swedenborg and Others, Through the Minds of Frances H. Mcdougall and Luna Hutchinson. D. M. Bennett.
- Melton, J. Gordon (2009) [1978]. "Fraternitas Rosae Crucis". Melton's Encyclopedia of American Religions (8th ed.). Gale Cengage Learning. ISBN 978-1-4144-0687-9.
