= Hermetic Brotherhood of Luxor =

Initiatic occult organisation

The Hermetic Brotherhood of Luxor was an initiatic occult organization that first became public in late 1894, although according to an official document of the order it began its work in 1870. According to this document, authored by Peter Davidson, the order was established by Max Théon, who when in England was initiated as a Neophyte by "an adept of the serene, ever-existing and ancient Order of the original H. B. of L."

== History ==
Theon became Grand Master of the Exterior Circle of the Order. However, apart from his initiatory role, he seems to have little to do with the day to day running of the order, or of its teachings. He seems to have left these things to Peter Davidson, who was the Provincial Grand Master of the North (Scotland), and later also the Eastern Section (America).

The order's teachings drew heavily from the magico-sexual theories of Paschal Beverly Randolph, who influenced groups such as Ordo Templi Orientis, although it is not clear whether or not Randolph himself was actually a part of the Order.

The Hermetic Brotherhood of Luxor (HBoL), while not the first of its kind, is a notable addition to the relatively small number of publicly known Orders from its era that openly taught practical occultism within the Western Mystery Tradition. This organization's contributions are significant in the context of the 19th-century occult revival, particularly for its emphasis on practical, experiential methods over purely theoretical teachings. Its curriculum and activities provided a foundation for later esoteric groups and had a lasting impact on the development of modern Western esotericism.

Among its members were a number of occultists, spiritualists, and Theosophists. Initial relations between the Order and the Theosophical Society were cordial, with most members of the order also prominent members of the T.S.

Later there was a falling out, as the Order was opposed to the eastern-based teachings of the later Blavatsky (Davidson considered that Blavatsky had fallen under the influence of "a greatly inferior Order, belonging to the Buddhist [sic] Cult"). Conversely, the conviction in 1883 of the Secretary of the Order, Thomas Henry Burgoyne for fraud, was claimed by the Theosophists to show the immorality of the Order. The Order's relation, if any, with the mysterious "Brotherhood of Luxor" that Helena Blavatsky spoke of is not clear.

== See also ==
- Magical organization
