= Life of L. Ron Hubbard from 1967 to 1975 =

From 1967 to 1975, L. Ron Hubbard presided over the Sea Org, a paramilitary group modeled after the US Navy.

Having been ejected from the United Kingdom, L. Ron Hubbard created the "sea project", taking many of his Scientology followers with him to sea. Wandering from port to port, this period saw his organization—renamed the Sea Org— turned into a paramilitary organization with harsh living conditions and brutal punishments including throwing people overboard and creating the Rehabilitation Project Force, a 'work prison'. Hubbard invented a new level of Scientology, OT III: the Wall of Fire, the space-opera story about Xenu and the Galactic Confederation who populated earth 75 million years ago.

In 1973 Hubbard launched Operation Snow White, a conspiracy which infiltrated US government agencies including the Department of Justice and the IRS, to purge records unfavorable to Scientology or Hubbard. In 1975, Hubbard suffered a heart attack, prompting his return to the United States.

== Creating the Sea Org ==
When Hubbard established the Sea Org he publicly declared that he had relinquished his management responsibilities. According to Miller, this was not true. He received daily telex messages from Scientology organizations around the world reporting their statistics and income. The Church of Scientology sent him $15,000 (equivalent to $144,835 in 2025) a week and millions of dollars were transferred to his bank accounts in Switzerland and Liechtenstein. Couriers arrived regularly, conveying luxury food for Hubbard and his family or cash that had been smuggled from England to avoid currency export restrictions.

After Hubbard created the Sea Org "fleet" in early 1967 in the Canary Islands it began an eight-year voyage, sailing from port to port in the Mediterranean Sea and eastern North Atlantic. The fleet traveled as far as Corfu in the eastern Mediterranean and Dakar and the Azores in the Atlantic, but rarely stayed anywhere for longer than six weeks. Ken Urquhart, Hubbard's personal assistant at the time, later recalled Hubbard claimed "many people were after him" and if he were unable to continue his work, "there would be social and economic chaos, if not a nuclear holocaust".

At the same time, Hubbard was still developing Scientology's doctrines. A Scientology biography states that "free of organizational duties and aided by the first Sea Org members, L. Ron Hubbard now had the time and facilities to confirm in the physical universe some of the events and places he had encountered in his journeys down the track of time."

== Creation of OT III ==
Hubbard wrote OT III in late 1966 and early 1967 in North Africa while on his way to Las Palmas to join the Enchanter, the first vessel of his private Scientology fleet (the "Sea Org"). In a letter of the time to his wife Mary Sue, Hubbard said that, in order to assist his research, he was drinking alcohol and taking stimulants and depressants. His assistant at the time, Virginia Downsborough, recalled she had to wean him off the diet of drugs to which he had become accustomed.

In 1967, Hubbard announced the release of OT3, the "Wall of Fire", revealing the secrets of an immense disaster that had occurred "on this planet, and on the other seventy-five planets which form this Confederacy, seventy-five million years ago". Scientologists were required to undertake the first two OT levels before learning how Xenu, the leader of the Galactic Confederacy, had shipped billions of people to Earth and blown them up with hydrogen bombs, following which their traumatized spirits were stuck together at "implant stations", brainwashed with false memories and eventually became contained within human beings. The discovery of OT3 was said to have taken a major physical toll on Hubbard, who announced that he had broken a knee, an arm, and his back during the course of his research. A year later, in 1968, he unveiled OT levels 4 to 6 and began delivering OT training courses to Scientologists aboard the Royal Scotman.

== The unglamorous side of the Sea Org ==
External videos
- "The Shrinking World of L. Ron Hubbard", 1967 interview with Hubbard

Scientologists around the world were presented with a glamorous picture of life in the Sea Org and many applied to join Hubbard aboard the fleet. What they found was rather different from the image. Most of those joining had no nautical experience at all. Mechanical difficulties and blunders by the crews led to a series of embarrassing incidents and near-disasters. Following one incident in which the rudder of the Royal Scotman was damaged during a storm, Hubbard ordered the ship's entire crew to be reduced to a "condition of liability" and wear gray rags tied to their arms. The ship itself was treated the same way, with dirty tarpaulins tied around its funnel to symbolize its lower status. According to those aboard, conditions were appalling; the crew was worked to the point of exhaustion, given meager rations and forbidden to wash or change their clothes for several weeks. Hubbard maintained a harsh disciplinary regime aboard the fleet, punishing mistakes by confining people in the Royal Scotman's bilge tanks without toilet facilities and with food provided in buckets. At other times erring crew members were thrown overboard with Hubbard looking on and, occasionally, filming. David Mayo, a Sea Org member at the time, later recalled trying to avoid negative thoughts about Hubbard, as routine security checking asked "Have you ever had any unkind thoughts about LRH?" and "you could get into very serious trouble if you had. So you tried hard not to." One member of the Sea Org recalled Hubbard punishing a little boy by confining him to the ship's chain locker.

On two separate occasions, orders to use R2-45 (killing them with a .45 pistol) on specific individuals were published in a prominent Scientology magazine. On March 6, 1968, Hubbard issued an internal memo titled "Racket Exposed", in which he denounced twelve people as "Enemies of mankind, the planet and all life", and ordered that "Any Sea Org member contacting any of them is to use Auditing Process R2-45." The memo was subsequently reproduced, with another name added, in the Church of Scientology's internal journal, The Auditor. Another four people were named in a second R2-45 order published in The Auditor later in 1968. Stephen A. Kent of the University of Alberta characterises such orders as demonstrations of "the manifestation of Hubbard's malignant narcissism and, more specifically, his narcissistic rage." The Santa Rosa News-Herald reported in 1982 that "attorneys have uncovered evidence to suggest that between 1975 and 1977, during the FBI's investigation of the cult, meetings of Scientology executives were held in which there were discussions relative to 'auditing' high-level FBI members with auditing process R2-45."

Hubbard taught that the problems of this period were due to "vicious, covert international attacks" by the United States government, "all of which were proven false and baseless, which were to last 27 years and finally culminated in the Government being sued for 750 million dollars for conspiracy." Behind the attacks, stated Hubbard, lay a vast conspiracy of "psychiatric front groups" secretly controlling governments: "Every single lie, false charge and attack on Scientology has been traced directly to this group's members. They have sought at great expense for nineteen years to crush and eradicate any new development in the field of the mind. They are actively preventing any effectiveness in this field."

From about 1970, Hubbard was attended aboard ship by the children of Sea Org members, organized as the Commodore's Messenger Organization (CMO). They were mainly young girls dressed in hot pants and halter tops, who were responsible for running errands for Hubbard such as lighting his cigarettes, dressing him or relaying his verbal commands to other members of the crew. In addition to his wife Mary Sue, he was accompanied by all four of his children by her, though not his first son Nibs, who had defected from Scientology in late 1959. The younger Hubbards were all members of the Sea Org and shared its rigors.

Along the way, Hubbard sought to establish a safe haven in "a friendly little country where Scientology would be allowed to prosper", as Miller puts it. The fleet stayed at Corfu for several months in 1968–1969. Hubbard renamed the ships after Greek gods—the Royal Scotman was rechristened Apollo—and he praised the recently established military dictatorship. The Sea Org was represented as "Professor Hubbard's Philosophy School" in a telegram to the Greek government. In March 1969, however, Hubbard and his ships were ordered to leave.

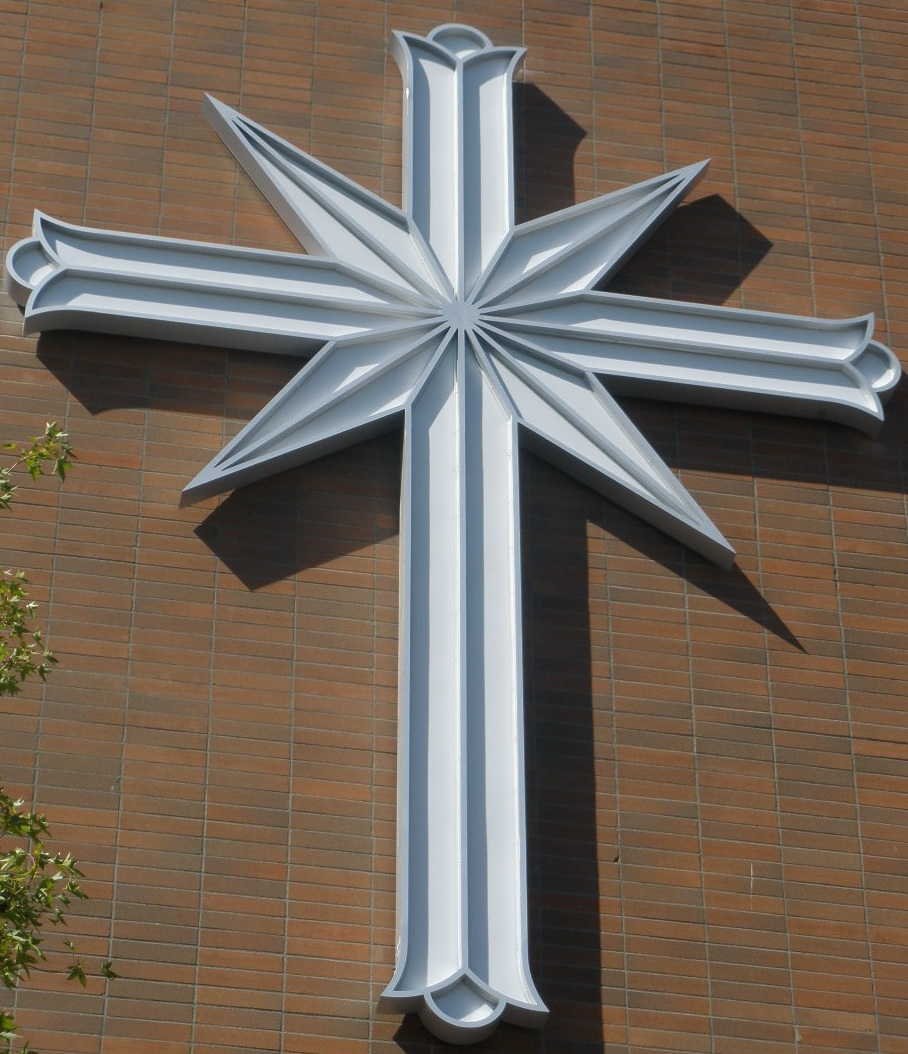
The Scientology cross came into use in 1969. Given Hubbard's private affinity for Crowley and antipathy to Christianity, it's been suggested that the cross may have been inspired by Crowley's Rose Cross or might be a "crossed-out cross" i.e. anti-Christian symbol.

The practice of prominently displaying the cross in Scientology centers was instituted in 1969 following hostile press coverage in the United Kingdom and elsewhere, when Scientology's status as a legitimate religion was being questioned. In response, Hubbard ordered that, "Any staff who are trained at any level as auditors (but not in AOs) are to be clothed in the traditioned ministerial black suit, black vest white collar silver cross for ordinary org wear."

In October 1969, The Sunday Times published an exposé by Australian journalist Alex Mitchell detailing Hubbard's occult experiences with Parsons and Aleister Crowley's teachings. The Church responded with a statement, claiming without evidence Hubbard was sent in by the US Government to "break up Black Magic in America" and succeeded.

In mid-1972, Hubbard again tried to find a safe haven, this time in Morocco, establishing contacts with the country's secret police and training senior policemen and intelligence agents in techniques for detecting subversives. The program ended in failure when it became caught up in internal Moroccan politics, and Hubbard left the country hastily in December 1972.

In 1972, French prosecutors charged Hubbard and the French Church of Scientology with fraud and customs violations. At risk of being extradited to France, Hubbard left the Sea Org fleet temporarily at the end of 1972, living incognito in Queens, New York. Hubbard's health deteriorated significantly during this period. A chain-smoker, he also suffered from bursitis and excessive weight, and had a prominent growth on his forehead. Hubbard returned to his flagship in September 1973 when the threat of extradition had abated.

Hubbard suffered serious injuries in a motorcycle accident on the island of Tenerife in December 1973. In 1974, Hubbard established the Rehabilitation Project Force. Quentin Hubbard reportedly found it difficult to adjust and attempted suicide in mid-1974. Also in 1974, L. Ron Hubbard confessed to two top executives, Bill Franks and David Mayo, that "People do not [leave Scientology] because of [their unconfessed sins], they leave because [they stop liking Scientology or stop believing it in]". Hubbard warned "If any of this information ever became public, I would lose all control of the orgs and eventually Scientology as a whole."

== FBI raid and aftermath ==
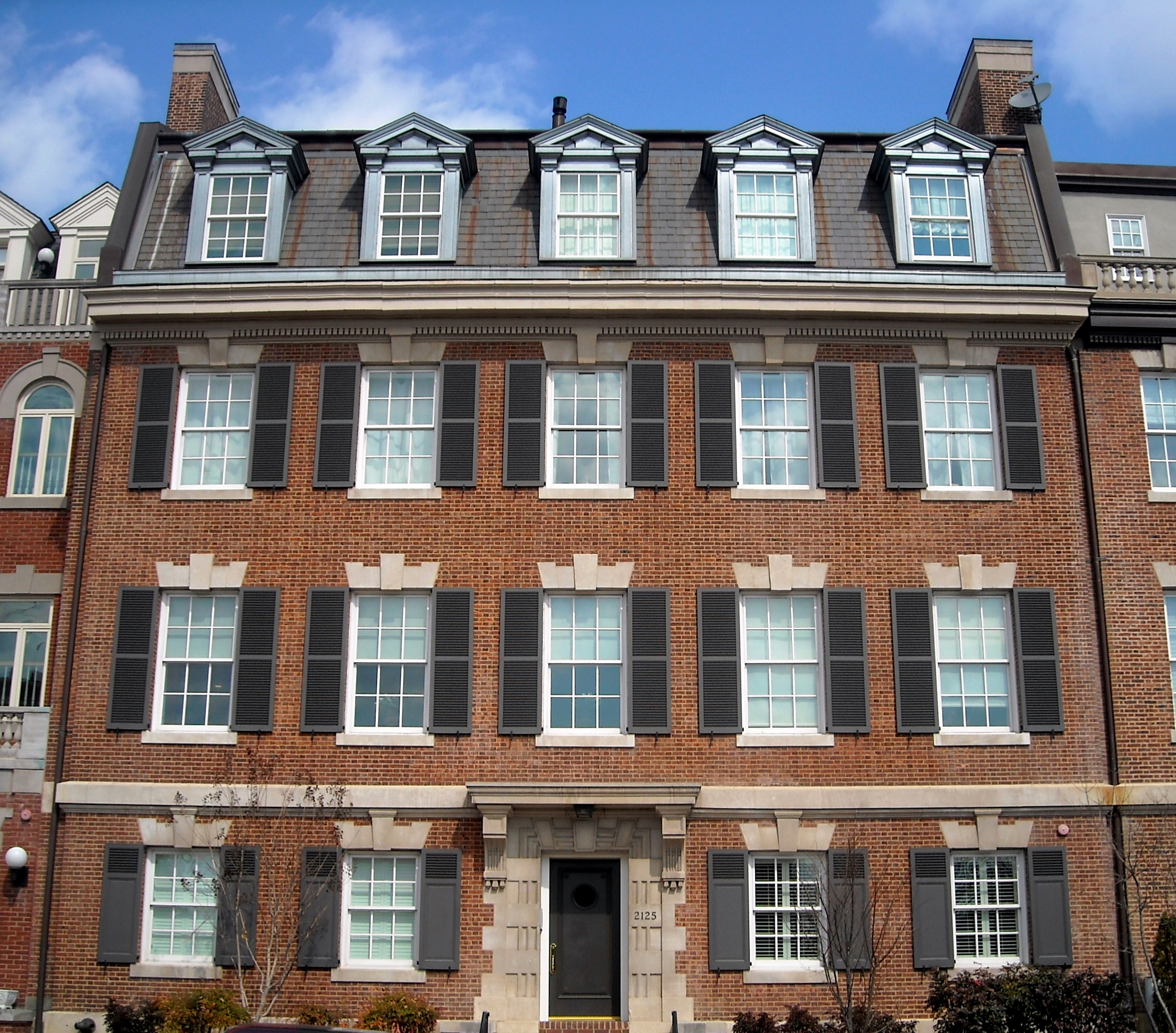
On July 8, 1977, after uncovering Operation Snow White, the FBI raided the Founding Church of Scientology in D.C. and seized thousands of documents revealing the scope of the Church's espionage operations.

Throughout this period, Hubbard was heavily involved in directing the activities of the Guardian's Office (GO), the legal bureau/intelligence agency that he had established in 1966. He believed that Scientology was being attacked by an international Nazi conspiracy, which he termed the "Tenyaka Memorial", through a network of drug companies, banks and psychiatrists in a bid to take over the world. In 1973, he instigated the "Snow White Program" and directed the GO to remove negative reports about Scientology from government files and track down their sources. The GO was ordered to "get all false and secret files on Scientology, LRH ... that cannot be obtained legally, by all possible lines of approach ... i.e., job penetration, janitor penetration, suitable guises utilizing covers." His involvement in the GO's operations was concealed through the use of codenames. The GO carried out covert campaigns on his behalf such as Operation Bulldozer Leak, intended "to effectively spread the rumor that will lead Government, media, and individual SPs to conclude that LRH has no control of the C of S and no legal liability for Church activity". He was kept informed of GO operations, such as the theft of medical records from a hospital, harassment of psychiatrists and infiltrations of organizations that had been critical of Scientology at various times, such as the Better Business Bureau, the American Medical Association, and American Psychiatric Association.

Members of the GO infiltrated and burglarized numerous government organizations, including the U.S. Department of Justice and the Internal Revenue Service.

Paulette Cooper, a freelance journalist and author, had begun researching Scientology in 1968 and wrote a critical article on the church for the British magazine Queen (now Harper's Bazaar) in 1969. The church promptly sued for libel, adding Queen to the dozens of British publications that it had already sued. Undeterred, Cooper expanded her article into a full-length book, The Scandal of Scientology: A chilling examination of the nature, beliefs and practices of the "now religion"; it was published by Tower Publications, Inc. of New York in the summer of 1971. The Church of Scientology filed at least 19 lawsuits against Cooper throughout the 1970s and 1980s, which Cooper considered part of "a typical Scientology dirty-tricks campaign" and which Cooper's attorney Michael Flynn said was motivated by L. Ron Hubbard's declaration that the purpose of a lawsuit was to "harass and discourage". Cooper discontinued her legal actions against Scientology in 1985 after receiving an out-of-court settlement.

== Sources ==
- Atack, Jon (1990). A Piece of Blue Sky: Scientology, Dianetics and L. Ron Hubbard Exposed. Lyle Stuart Books. ISBN 081840499X. OL 9429654M.
- Evans, Christopher. Cults of Unreason. New York: Farrar, Straus and Giroux, 1974. ISBN 0-374-13324-7, OCLC 863421
- Melton, J. Gordon. Encyclopedic handbook of cults in America. Taylor & Francis; 1992. ISBN 978-0-8153-1140-9
- Miller, Russell (1987). Bare-faced Messiah : The True Story of L. Ron Hubbard. Henry Holt and Company. ISBN 0805006540. OCLC 17481843. OL 26305813M.
- Streissguth, Thomas (1995). Charismatic cult leaders. The Oliver Press. ISBN 978-1-881508-18-2. OCLC 30892074.
