= Constant Chevillon =

French occultist

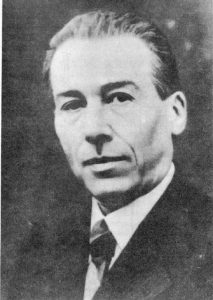

Constant Chevillon (born 26 October 1880 in Annoire (Jura); died 25 March 1944 in Lyon) was a French occultist who was Grand Master of the Freemasonry Rite of Memphis-Misraïm and head of FUDOFSI and other occult societies.

== Education and civil work ==
At an early age, his prodigious memory and learning genius made their debut and the priest decided to teach him Latin. At the age of twelve, he entered the College of Montciel, near Lons-le-Saunier (Jura). He studied Literature, Ancient History, the Classics and Philosophy. He moved on to higher branches of learning, receiving a bachelor's degree at the Faculty of Letters at Lyon where he also received his Licentiate's Degree and a Fellowship. He studied philosophy under the celebrated Professor Arthur Hennequin. He knew Socrates' Precepts of Self-knowledge, but the one that guided his life was: "Renounce thyself while serving others". His philosophy professor was such an ideal for him that after Hennequin's death, he left the university.

He went to work at the Société Générale, a bank in Lyon and worked there until 1913. Later he went to work for the Banque Nationale de Crédit in Lyon and continued his work there until his death.

== Esoteric activities ==
As a member of the Rosicrucian Fraternity, he was opposed to Harvey Spencer Lewis' AMORC and FUDOSI.

He was enthroned as Patriarch of the Eglise Gnostique Universelle after Jean Bricaud, and succeeded by one of his students, René Chambellant, who maintained the compendium of esoteric societies in cooperation with the Gnostic church.

== Death ==
During World War II, he was shot and killed by the militia (French police submitted to the Gestapo) in a brutal hostage murder on 23 March 1944 in Lyon.

== Books ==
- C. Chevillon (1926). Orient ou Occident? (PDF) (in French). Paris: Chacornac.
- C. Chevillon (1936). Réflexions sur le temple social (PDF) (in French). Lyon: Ed. des annales initiatiques.
- C. Chevillon (1939). Le vrai visage de la franc-maçonnerie (PDF) (in French). Lyon: Derain.
- C. Chevillon (1943). Du néant à l'être (PDF) (in French). Lyons: Derain.
- C. Chevillon (1944). Et verbum caro factum est (PDF) (in French). Lyon: Derain.
- C. Chevillon (1946). La Tradition Universelle (PDF) (in French). Lyon: Derain.
- C. Chevillon (1953). Méditations Initiatiques (PDF) (in French). Lyon: Derain.
