= Spiritual Telegraph =

Newspaper in United States of America

- Type: Weekly newspaper
- Publisher: Charles Partridge
- Founded: 1852
- Ceased publication: 1860
- Headquarters: New York City
- OCLC number: 28296471

The Spiritual Telegraph was a New York City newspaper published from 1852–1860.

The Telegraph originated in the New York Conference for the Investigation of Spiritual Phenomena and reported that body's proceedings each week in the almost eight years that the journal was published. It is the first truly spiritualistic journal published in the United States, though the Univercoelum and the Spiritual Philosopher and others of more general nature antedate it. Though mild by even contemporary standards, the journal's "original goal of reporting spirit communication and furthering anti-credal reform" finally "aroused the emnity [sic] of all," as the journal admitted in changing its editorial line in 1858 and taking up the new name of Spiritual Telegraph and Fireside Preacher."
