= FUDOSI =

Federation of autonomous esoteric or mystical orders and societies

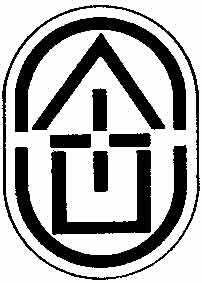
Official logo of FUDOSI

FUDOSI (French: Fédération Universelle des Ordres et Sociétés Initiatiques; Latin: Federatio Universalis Dirigens Ordines Societatesque Initiationis) was a federation of autonomous esoteric or mystical orders and societies, founded on August 14, 1934, in Brussels, Belgium, and disbanded in 1951. It was opposed by the similarly named Fédération Universelle des Ordres, Fraternités et Sociétés Initiatiques (FUDOFSI).

== History ==
FUDOSI was an attempt to create a federation of mystical orders with the mission "to protect the sacred liturgies, rites and doctrines of the traditional initiatory Orders from being appropriated and profaned by clandestine organizations." One of its leading founders was AMORC (Ancient Mystical Order Rosae Crucis). An AMORC document describes the nature of FUDOSI as follows:

Some persons, whose minds have not as yet received sufficient light, have been wondering why it was necessary to gather in a Universal Federation the Initiatique Orders and Societies, which, in their own field of work, enjoy the most absolute and complete freedom and perfect autonomy and independence. To this query we may reply that, more than in anything else, it is the initiatique work that the greatest vigilance is indispensable and that a strict and active international discipline must be exercised. We must acknowledge and regret, that there exist many false prophets and a number of so-called initiates who use, for selfish and tyrannical purposes of domination, the pretext of initiation to thrust themselves on, and exploit, gullible and sincere persons. It was high time to warn the public against these false leaders and against noxious doctrines which they taught to trusting souls. In each country, each authentic and regular Order knows its imitators and such false prophets. It was necessary to watch these clandestine movements, to expose these impostors or instruments of hidden and unavowed forces, in all countries, wherever they be operating, and thus avoid any confusion between the regular and authentic Orders and false Organizations that are harmful or that give teachings that have nothing to do with the Universal Tradition and Esoterism. And also it was necessary that the authentic Orders be careful in selecting their members and their officers and in maintaining their adepts and students on the right path of the true doctrines, obliging them to follow a strict line of discipline, rational, sincere and conscientious work, so as to avoid radical teachings and heterodoxy. This immense work which was intended to protect the Orders against their inner and outer enemies has been successfully carried on by the F.U.D.O.S.I. and is now going on.

== Leadership and organisation ==
SAR, a title which means Son of Ra or Son Altesse Royale (His Royal Highness), was attached to all dignitaries of FUDOSI. After the first organised convention in 1934, 12 members were chosen to form the Supreme Council, led by 3 imperators:

- Sar Hieronymus (Emile Dantinne) Imperator of Europe
- Sar Alden (Harvey Spencer Lewis) Imperator of the American continent
- Sar Yesir (Victor Blanchard) Imperator of "The Orient".

H. S. Lewis (Sar Alden) created the symbol of FUDOSI. After Lewis' death in 1939, his son Ralph Maxwell Lewis became one of the three imperators of FUDOSI, under the name Sar Validivar. In 1946 Andre Cordonnier became one of its imperators.

== Associated organisations ==
Here is a list of the orders and societies represented on the first FUDOSI convention of 1934:

- Ordre de la Rose+Croix universelle (Sar Hieronymus)
- Ordre de la Rose+Croix universitaire (Sar Hieronymus, Sar Elgrim)
- Ordre kabbalistique de la Rose+Croix (Sar Yesir representing Lucien Mauchel)
- Confrerie des Freres illumines de la Rose+Croix (Sar Amertis)
- A.M.O.R.C. U.S.A. (Sar Alden, Sar Emmanuel, Sar Iohannes)
- Militia crucifera evangelica (Sar Alden)
- Ordre ancien et mystique de la Rose+Croix AMORC-Switzerland (Sar Amertis representing Sar Alkmaion)
- Societe alchimique de France (Sar Amertis)
- Ordre des Samaritains inconnus (Sar Amertis)
- Ordre hermetiste tetramegiste et mystique or Ordre Pythagoricien (Sar Succus, Sar Helios)
- Ordre martiniste et synarchique (Sar Yesir)
- Fraternite des Polaires (Sar Yesir)
- Ordre maçonnique oriental de Memphis-Mizraim stricte observance (Sar Iohannes, Sar Ludovicus)
- Co-masonic Order of Memphis-Mizraim (Sar Laya, Sar Fulgur)
- L'Eglise gnostique universelle (Tau Targelius = Victor Blanchard)

Ordre maçonnique oriental de Memphis-Misraim (stricte observance) and the Mixed Order of Memphis-Mizraim, the only Masonic organizations associated with FUDOSI, were expelled according to a decision taken by the three Imperators (Lewis, Dantinne, Blanchard) on August 1, 1935.

== Position with respect to Masonry ==
A document by FUDOSI titled "Rapport sur les ordres et sociétés initiatiques. 12/10/1941", written by FUDOSI Imperator Emille Dantinne, states with regard to Freemasonry:

In 1934, at the time of the foundation of the F.U.D.O.S.I., Freemasonry was condemned by the attending Orders as an atheistic organization and no Masonic Order would be admitted to the federation. One exception was made in favour of the Antient Rite of Memphis-Misraim, which was recognized as a spiritual Order not recognized by the other Masonic Obediences.

But the admission turned out to be an error. Later in the document we read:

... no collaboration is possible between the F.U.D.O.S.I. and any masonic rite or order. In 1935, the leaders of the F.U.D.O.S.I. excluded the only masonic order within their ranks. They even forced their members to break all their ties to masonry, under penalty of exclusion (with the exception of Mr.Wittemans, who remained a member of a masonic organization).

These declarations may be considered inconsistent with the fact that Freemasonry requires its members to believe in a Supreme Being. It is unknown whether these views were exclusive to Emille Dantinne or held by more FUDOSI members, however Sar Alden was a member of the Antient Rite of Memphis-Misraim.

== Dissolution ==
After the end of the 8th convention (August 14, 1951) FUDOSI dissolved after strong disagreements between Emile Dantinne and Ralph M. Lewis. The 8th convention ended after Ralph M. Lewis criticized Jean Mallinger (Sar Elgrim), a FUDOSI dignitary, for having a "problem" with AMORC for its admission of Afro-American members. The three Imperators signed an official document that marked the end of FUDOSI.
