= Fraternitas Rosae Crucis =

U.S. Rosicrucian fraternal organization

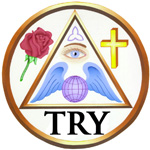
Logo of the Fraternitas Rosae Crucis

Fraternitas Rosae Crucis (Fraternity of the Rosy Cross, FRC or F.R.C.) is a Rosicrucian fraternal organization established in the United States by Paschal Beverly Randolph in 1856, and is the oldest Rosicrucian Order founded in the United States. They also operate Beverly Hall Corporation and the Clymer Health Center in Quakertown, Pennsylvania.

== History ==
The FRC's first lodge was established in San Francisco in 1861 three years after the founding of the organization, but closed soon after. In 1871 they established another lodge in Boston and in 1874, reestablished in San Francisco. In 1875 they finally settled in Philadelphia.

While Reuben Swinburne Clymer headed the order, the Fraternitas Rosae Crucis established itself at Beverly Hall, in Quakertown, Pennsylvania.

== Supreme Grand Masters ==
- Paschal Beverly Randolph (1858–1875)
- Freeman Benjamin Dowd (1875–1907)
- Edward Holmes Brown (1907–1922)
- Reuben Swinburne Clymer (1922–1966)
- Emerson Myron Clymer (1966–1983)
- Gerald Eugene Poesnecker (1983–2003)
- William Glen Kracht (2003–present)

== See also ==
- Mysticism
- Esotericism

== Sources ==
- Greer, John Michael (2008). The Element Encyclopedia of Secret Societies (2nd ed.). Harper Collins. ISBN 978-1-4351-1088-5.
- Greer, John Michael (2003). The New Encyclopedia of the Occult. Llewellyn Publications. ISBN 978-1-56718-336-8.
- Barrett, David V. (2007). A Brief History of Secret Societies. Running Press. ISBN 978-0-7867-1983-9.
- Lewis, James R. (2001). Satanism Today: An Encyclopedia of Religion, Folklore, and Popular Culture. Santa Barbara: ABC-CLIO. ISBN 978-1-57607-292-9.
- Melton, J. Gordon (2009) [1978]. "Fraternitas Rosae Crucis". Melton's Encyclopedia of American Religions (8th ed.). Gale Cengage Learning. ISBN 978-1-4144-0687-9.
