= List of Masonic Grand Lodges in Europe =

This is a list of all verifiable organizations that claim to be a Masonic Grand Lodge in Europe.

A Masonic "Grand Lodge" (or sometimes "Grand Orient") is the governing body that supervises the individual "Lodges of Freemasons" in a particular geographical area, known as its "jurisdiction" (usually corresponding to a sovereign state or other major geopolitical unit). Some are large, with thousands of members divided into hundreds of subordinate lodges, while others are tiny, with only a few members split between a handful of local lodges. Sometimes there will only be one Grand Lodge in a given area, but the majority of the time there will be at least two. More often, there will be several competing Grand Lodges claiming the same jurisdictional area, or claiming overlapping areas. This fact leads to debates over legitimacy: Not all Grand Lodges and Grand Orients recognize each other as being legitimate. However, such recognition is not relevant to this list, yet recognition is foundational within the fraternal order. Inclusion in this list only requires the establishment of a physical (as opposed to a virtual, or online) presence, and lodges (regular, unrecognized or clandestine) which acknowledge their governance.

Membership numbers are subject to change; for current figures, check the sources which are indicated in the reference section.

== Europe ==
Jurisdictional area	Name	Founded	Lodges	Members	Notes
Albania	Lozha e Madhe Shqiptare Iliria (Albanian Grand Lodge "Illyria")	2013	5	80	MUB, UMM, CLIPSAS
Albania	Lozha e Madhe e Shqipërisë (Grand Lodge of Albania)	2011	5	100	
Albania	Orienti i Madh i Gurit dhe Detit (Grand Orient of the Stone and the Sea)	1991	5	47	
Andorra	Gran Lògia d'Andorra (Grand Lodge of Andorra)	2000	9	200+	
Armenia	Grand Lodge of Armenia	2002	7		
Austria	Großloge von Österreich (The Grand Lodge of Austria A.F. & A.M.)	1918	73	3,258	
Austria	Großorient von Österreich (Grand Orient of Austria)	1961	9	170	CLIPSAS
Austria	Liberale Großloge von Österreich (Liberal Grand Loge of Austria)	1961/2007	7	150	CLIPSAS
Austria	Droit Humain of Austria	1955	27	600	DH
Austria	Grand Lodge Humanitas	1961	3	40	CLIPSAS CATENA
Austria	Universaler Freimaurerorden Hermetica	1960	3	40	
Austria	Regular Grand Lodge of Austria	2019	3	35	#SOGLIA
Austria	United Grand Lodge International	2025	3	34	SOGLIA
Belgium	Fédération Belge du Droit Humain / Belgische federatie van Droit Humain (le Droit Humain, Belgian Federation)	1928	61	6,500	AMIL, DH, LFB, SIMPA
Belgium	Grande Loge de Belgique / Grootloge van België (Grand Lodge of Belgium)	1959	52	2,500	LFB, AMIL, CLIPSAS
Belgium	Grande Loge féminine de Belgique / Vrouwengrootloge van België (Women's Grand Lodge of Belgium)	1981	33	1,600	LFB, AMIL, CLIPSAS, CLIMAF
Belgium	Grande Loge Régulière de Belgique / Reguliere Grootloge van België (Regular Grand Lodge of Belgium)	1979	52	720	
Belgium	Grand Orient de Belgique (Grand Orient of Belgium)	1833	108	10,000+	LFB, AMIL, SIMPA, CLIPSAS
Bulgaria	Великата Ложа на Старите Свободни и Приети Зидари в България (Grand Lodge A.F. & A.M. of Bulgaria)	1997 (1991)	70	near 2,000	NUGLB Formed by Lodges working under the Grand Lodge of Ancient Free & Accepted Masons of Germany, part of the United Grand Lodges of Germany and received official support and charter from the United Grand Lodges of Germany on September 20, 1997
Bulgaria	Обединена велика ложа на България (United Grand Lodge of Bulgaria)	2001	55	1,846	
Bulgaria	Великата Ложа на България (Grand Lodge of Bulgaria)	1917 (revived 2010)	3	50	NUGLB
Croatia	Velika loža starih, slobodnih i prihvaćenih zidara Hrvatske (Grand Lodge of Ancient, Free and Accepted Masons of Croatia)	1775	12	350	
Croatia	Velika Simbolička Loža Hrvatske (Grand Symbolic Lodge of Croatia)	2018	4	65	
Croatia	Velika Nacionalna Loža Hrvatske (Grand National Lodge of Croatia)	2014			
Cyprus	ΜΕΓΑΛΗ ΣΤΟΑ ΤΗΣ ΚΥΠΡΟΥ (Grand Lodge of Cyprus)	2006	12	520	
Czech Republic	Grand Lodge of the Czech Republic (Veliká Lóže České Republiky)	1923	23	500	
Czech Republic	Grand Lodge of the Czech Lands (Velká lóže zemí Českých)	2002	4	60	
Czech Republic	Velká lóže svobodných a přijatých zednářů Humanitas Bohemia	28 October 1993	2	60	CATENA
Denmark	Danske Frimurerorden (Danish Order of Freemasons)	1743	100	9,497	
Denmark	Storlogen af Danmark (Grand Lodge of Denmark)	1932	4		CLIPSAS
Estonia	Grand Lodge of Estonia	18 February 1999	12	340+	
Estonia	Grand Orient of Estonia	2010	5	52	
Finland	Suomen Suurloosi / Storlogen i Finland (Grand Lodge of F. & A. Masons of Finland)	1924	159	7,036	
Finland	Le Droit Humain Suomen Liitto / Internationella Sam-Frimurarorden Le Droit Humain Finska Förbundet	1920	13	DH	
France	Fédération française de l'Ordre maçonnique mixte international le Droit Humain (le Droit Humain – French Federation)	1893	518	16,000	DH, IMF, UMM
France	Grande Loge de France (GLdF or GLF)	1894	850	34,000	CIGLU
France	Grande Loge Européenne de la Fraternité Universelle (European Grand Lodge of the Universal Fraternity, GLEFU)	2013	33	500	
France	Grande Loge féminine de France (Women's Grand Lodge of France)	1945 / 1952	360	13,000	CLIMAF, IMF, UMM
France	Grande loge écossaise réformée et rectifiée d'Occitanie	1995	15	250	
France	Grande Loge féminine de Memphis-Misraïm	1965		1,000	IMF
France	Grande Loge Française de Memphis-Misraïm	1960	21	300	CLIPSAS
France	Grande Loge mixte de France	1982	175	4,000	IMF CLIPSAS
France	Grande Loge mixte universelle	1973	57	1,200	IMF CLIPSAS
France	Grande Loge Nationale Française (GLNF)	1913	600	29,000	CMI
France	Grande Loge Traditionnelle et Symbolique Opéra (GLTSO)	1958	202	4,500	IMF CIGLU
France	Grande Loge unie de France	1994	12	150	
France	Grand Orient de France (Grand Orient of France) (GODF)	1728 / 1773	1,350	56,000	AMIL, IMF, SIMPA, CLIPSAS, UMM
France	Loge nationale française	1968	25	300	IMF
France	Ordre initiatique et traditionnel de l'Art royal	1974	75	930	IMF
Georgia	Grand Lodge of Georgia	2015	7		CIGLU, BCMA, CMC
Georgia	United Grand Lodge of Georgia (UGLG)	2015 / 2018	13	180	GLoT/GLoA/GLoU/GLoR/VGLvD
Germany	Große National-Mutterloge „Zu den drei Weltkugeln“ (GNML 3WK)	1740-09-13	40		VGLvD
Germany	Große Landesloge der Freimaurer von Deutschland (GLL FvD)		100	3,500	VGLvD
Germany	Souveräner GrossOrient von Deutschland (SGOvD)	2002	7		
Germany	Großloge der Alten Freien und Angenommenen Maurer von Deutschland (GL AFuAMvD)	1949-06-19	260	10,000	VGLvD Formed as United Grand Lodge of Germany in 1949, it changed its name in 1958 on the formation of the United Grand Lodges of Germany
Germany	The Grand Lodge of British Freemasons in Germany (GL BFG)	1959/1982	16		VGLvD
Germany	American Canadian Grand Lodge (ACGL)	1962-09-29/1970-10-23	44 – The five units of the VGLvD, constituting the United Grand Lodges of Germany, have 477 lodges.	The five units of the VGLvD, constituting the United Grand Lodges of Germany, have 14,000 members.	VGLvD, CGMNA
Germany	Le Droit Humain – Deutsche Jurisdiktion	1969-12-31			DH
Germany	Humanitas – Freimaurergrossloge für Männer und Frauen in Deutschland	1959	10	160	CATENA, CLIPSAS
Germany	Frauen-Grossloge von Deutschland (FGLvD)	1982	18		CLIMAF
Greece	Μεγάλη Στοά της Ελλάδος (Grand Lodge of Greece, A.F. & A.M.)	1876	117	2000	
Greece	Εθνική Μεγάλη Στοά της Ελλάδος (National Grand Lodge of Greece)	1986	117	1800	
Hungary	Magyarországi Symbolikus Nagypáholy (Symbolic Grand Lodge of Hungary)	1886/1989	14	400	
Hungary	Magyarországi Nagyoriens (Grand Orient of Hungary)	1871/1992	9	300	
Iceland	Icelandic Order of Freemasons, Grand Lodge of Iceland	1951	16	3,459	
Ireland (Eire and Northern Ireland)	Grand Lodge of Ireland	1725	696		
Italy	Grande Oriente d'Italia (Grand Orient of Italy)	1805	777	21,686	HC of Italy
Italy	Gran Loggia d’Italia (Grand Lodge of Italy; the "Piazza del Gesú" or "Palazzo Vitelleschi" Obedience)	1908	420	9,500	CLIPSAS, SIMPA, UMM
Italy	Grand Lodge of Jerusalem	2022	9	3620	
Italy	Regular Grand Lodge of Italy	1993	210	3,500	
Italy	Gran Loggia Italiana	2007	24	300	
Italy	Ordine Massonico Tradizionale Italiano	2016	123	1,200	
Italy	Gran Loggia Massonica Femminile d’Italia	1990	11	185	CLIPSAS, CLIMAF
Italy	Gran Loggia Nazionale dei Liberi Muratori d'Italia	1805	80		CGLEM
Italy	Grande Oriente Universale	2002	296	4603	
Latvia	Latvijas Lielloža	2003	6	150+	
Liechtenstein	Grand Lodge of The Principality Liechtenstein	2016	3	60	http://freimaurerei.li/
Lithuania	Lietuvos laisvuju murininku Didžioji Lože AF & AM (Grand Lodge of Lithuania)	2002	6		
Luxembourg	Grande Loge du Luxembourg	1803	5	280	
Luxembourg	Grande Orient du Luxembourg	1959 / 1982	12	459	CLIPSAS, UMM
Luxembourg	Ordre Maçonnique Mixte International le Droit Humain	1982	2		DH
North Macedonia	The Grand Lodge of Macedonia	2005	6	180	
North Macedonia	Regular Grand Lodge of Macedonia	2010	3	83	
North Macedonia	Grand Lodge Makedon	2004(2011)	4	110	
Malta	Sovereign Grand Lodge of Malta	2004	9	300	
Malta	Grand Lodge of Jerusalem	1966	8	100+	
Moldova	Marea Lojă a Moldovei (Grand Lodge of Moldova)	1999	18	170	
Monaco	La Grande Loge Nationale Régulière de la Principauté de Monaco	2011-02-19		200	
Montenegro	Velká Lóže Crne Gore (Grand Lodge of Montenegro)	2007	4		
The Netherlands	Grand Orient of the Netherlands	1756	164	6,302	
The Netherlands	Grande Loge Mixte des Pays-Bas (Mixed Grand Lodge of the Low Countries)	2001 ?	7		CLIPSAS
Norway	Norwegian Order of Freemasons	1891	63	18,900	
Poland	Grand Orient of Poland	12.07.1997	7		AACEE, EMA
Poland	National Grand Lodge of Poland/Wielka Loża Narodowa Polski	1781	14		
Portugal	Grande Loja Simbólica de Portugal	2015	17		CLIPSAS, UMM, AME
Portugal	Federação Portuguesa de Ordem Maçónica Mista Internacional “Le Droit Humain” (DHPT) (le Droit Humain – Portuguese Federation)	1980	8		DH
Portugal	Grand Loja Feminina de Portugal (GLFP) (Feminine Grand Lodge of Portugal)	1997	15		CLIMAF
Portugal	Grande Loja Nacional Portuguesa (GLNP) (National Grand Lodge of Portugal)	1996	10		CIGLU
Portugal	Grand Loja Legal de Portugal (GLLP/GLRP) (Legal Grand Lodge of Portugal/Regular Grand Lodge of Portugal)	1991	98	2,000	
Portugal	Grand Orient of Lusitania	1802			CLIPSAS, UMM
Romania	Marele Orient al Romaniei (MOAR)	1879/1925/2005	43	617	CLIPSAS, AME, [AACEE]
Romania	Marea Lojă Regulară Europa Unită (MLREU) Regular Grand Lodge Europa Unita	2016	7	117	#SOGLIA
Romania	Marea Lojă Regulară a României (MLRR ) Regular Grand Lodge of Romania	2005	17	320	#SOGLIA Established in 2005 by Brother Nicu Filip first Grand Master of MLNdR in 1993 under the name National Grand Lodge Dacia. In 2008 joined Masonic High Council the Mother High Council of the World when changes the name into Regular Grand Lodge of Romania. Starting 2017 (6017) Grand Master Sergiu Protopopescu. 2 December 2017 established lodge Dimitrie Cantemir Eastern Moscow.
Romania	Marea Lojă Naţională din România (MLNdR) (National Grand Lodge of Romania)	1880/1993	361	10,000	
Romania	Marea Lojă Naţională Română "1880" (Romanian National Grand Lodge "1880")	1880/1993/2010	32	550	World Traditional Masonic Union (W.T.M.U.); World Masonic Christian Alliance (W.M.C.A.)
România	Traditional Grand Lodge of Romania (MLTR) Marea Lojă Tradiţională din România	2015	7	130	#SOGLIA
Romania	Marea Lojă Națională a României (MLNaR) (National Grand Lodge of Romania)	2002	28	2,500	split from Marea Lojă Naţională din România in 2002
Russia	Grand Lodge of Russia	1995	33	700	
Russia	United Grand Lodge of Russia	2008	6	70	
Russia	Grand Orient de France	1728/1773	4	100	
San Marino	Serenissima Gran Loggia della Repubblica di San Marino (Most Serene Grand Lodge of the Republic of San Marino)	2003	5	80	
Serbia	National Grand Lodge of Serbia	1997	20	500	CIGLU
Serbia	Regular Grand Lodge of Serbia	1919 (as GL Yugoslavia)	30	1,006	
Serbia	Liberal Grand Lodge of Serbia	2006	17	450	
Serbia	Grand Orient of Serbia	2016	30	900	
Slovak Republic	Veľká Lóža Slovenska	21 March 2009	3	60	
Slovenia	Grand Lodge of Slovenia	1999			International Confederation of the United Grand Lodges / Confederation Internationale Des Grandes Unies
Spain (Canary Islands)	Gran Logia de Canarias	1923			CIGLU
Spain (Catalonia)	Gran Lògia de Catalunya	1933	3		
Spain	Gran Logia de España - Gran Oriente Español	1982	176	2,500	
Spain	Gran Logia Simbólica Española (Spanish Symbolic Grand Lodge)	1980	41		CLIPSAS, UMM
Spain (Catalonia)	Gran Orient de Catalunya	1989	9		CLIPSAS
Spain (Aragon)	Gran Logia de Aragón - Gran Oriente de Aragón	1997	7		
Sweden	Swedish Order of Freemasons	1735	43	14,200	
Sweden	Le Droit Humain – Scandinavian Federation (Sweden)	1918			DH
Sweden	Grand Orient Latinoamericano	1984	5		CLIPSAS
Switzerland	Grande Loge Suisse Alpina	1844	82	3,842	
Switzerland	Fédération Suisse du Droit Humain	1896			DH
Switzerland	Grande Loge Mixte de Suisse (Mixed Grand Lodge of Switzerland)	1999	8	145	
Switzerland	Grand Orient de Suisse	1959	18		CLIPSAS
Switzerland	Grande Loge Féminine de Suisse	1976	17	350	CLIMAF
Turkey	Grand Lodge of Turkey F.& A.M.	1909	224	14,788	
Turkey	Liberal Grand Lodge of Turkey	1966	55	2,000	CLIPSAS, UMM
Ukraine	Grand Lodge of Ukraine	1919 / 2005	13	250	
United Kingdom	International Order of Freemasonry for Men and Women, LE DROIT HUMAIN, British Federation	1902	15		CLIPSAS
United Kingdom (England and Wales)	United Grand Lodge of England (UGLE)	1717 / 1813	7000	200000	
United Kingdom (Scotland)	Grand Lodge of Scotland	1736	1,050	150000	

== See also ==
- List of Masonic Grand Lodges
