= Freemasonry in Germany =

Freemasonry in Germany (German: Freimaurerei) started in several places during the second quarter of the Eighteenth century. After the extinction of the Rite of Strict Observance, which had a wide following and claimed Templar origins for its higher degrees, the several Grand Lodges in Germany defied all attempts at unification, although a largely ineffectual central organisation came into being with the unification of Germany. During the 1920s Freemasons were harassed alongside Jews by those taken in by the Protocols of the Elders of Zion, and blamed for the German surrender of 1918. This culminated with the suppression of Freemasonry by the Nazis in 1935, with many Masons in Germany and occupied countries being executed or sent to concentration camps. Freemasonry returned to Germany after World War Two. A single central body now represents five "regular" Grand Lodges. Liberal, women's, and mixed lodges also exist.

== Origins ==
Even before there were lodges in Germany, Germans were becoming Freemasons in English lodges. One of the earliest was Albert Wolfgang, Count of Schaumburg-Lippe. In 1729 Count Thuanus was appointed Envoy Extraordinary of Brunswick-Lüneburg and Provincial Grand Master of Lower Saxony by the Premier Grand Lodge of England with the aim of establishing lodges in Germany. No activity for this Provincial Grand Master is known. In 1733 'eleven German Gentlemen' in London were admitted to Freemasonry and received permission to found a lodge in Hamburg. There is no evidence that anything came of this, either.

It was only on 6 December 1737 that the Grand Master's Deputies of the Kingdom of Prussia and the Electorate of Brandenburg Hamburg founded a lodge. This first German lodge was called Loge d'Hambourg but did not belong to any Grand Lodge. Its second master went to the London Grand Lodge in 1743 and registered it as lodge number 108, returning with the title of Provincial Grand Master. Later that year the lodge was named Absalom zu den drei Nesseln. In 1738 Loge aux trois aigles blancs was founded in Dresden by Count Rutowski. It had such a large intake that two more lodges emerged from it within two years.

By 1754 a total of 19 lodges were founded in Germany. Gradually, provincial, grand and mother lodges emerged, such as the Provincial Grand Lodge of Hamburg in 1740, the Mother Lodge l'Union of Frankfurt in 1741, the Grand Lodge of Upper Saxony in 1741 and the Grand Royal Mother Lodge The Three Globes in 1744.

=== Emergence of the higher degrees in Germany ===
The Rite of Strict Observance arose in Germany in the middle of the 18th century, introducing the concept of Higher degrees in Freemasonry. The founder, Karl Gotthelf von Hund, claimed to have been initiated into the higher degrees by Scottish Jacobites, who guarded the secrets of the Knights Templar. He alleged that he was charged with reviving the Templar order in Germany. With the failure of the Jacobite revolt of 1745, he lost touch with his Jacobite masters (unbekannten Oberen or secret chiefs). In 1764, seeking to re-establish this link, he unintentionally unmasked a fraud calling himself George Frederick Johnson, who claimed to be an exiled Jacobite with knowledge of the higher degrees of Freemasonry. The lodges that Johnson had deceived placed themselves under von Hund, and Strict Observance was born, rapidly becoming the predominant form of masonry in Germany.

After von Hund died in 1776, the prince who would later become Charles XIII of Sweden was elected to succeed him. In the convent of Lyon the order began to distance itself from descent from the Knights Templar. The "Chevaliers de la Cité Sainte bienfaisants" came into existence. In the convent of Wolfenbüttel in 1778, the Grand National Mother Lodge, "The Three Globes" withdrew from the Strict Observance for political reasons. On 16 July 1782 the Strict Observance came together one last time at the Convent of Wilhelmsbad. In 50 days they dismissed the legend of descent from the Knights Templar and the Secret Chiefs. Strict Observance ceased to exist.

=== Foundation of German Grand Lodges ===
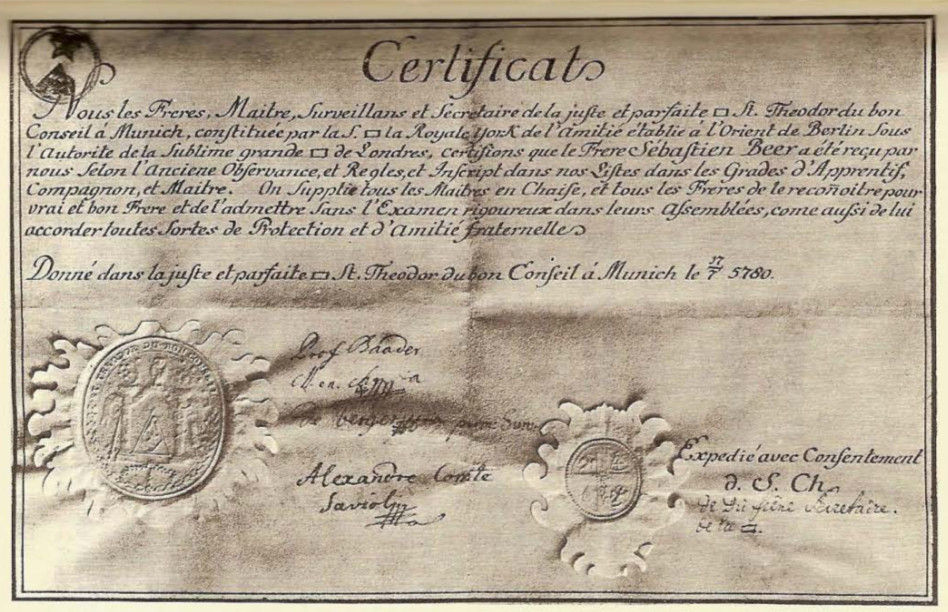
A Bavarian masonic certificate from 1780, written in French

After the era of the Strict Observance, set against much stranger forms of Freemasonry, the craft in Germany came to be governed by several strong and durable Grand Lodges. The Grand National Mother Lodge, "The Three Globes" and the Grand Mother Lodge "Zur Sonne" had already been established in 1744. They were followed by the Grand Landlodge of the Freemasons of Germany in 1770, the Great Mother Lodge of the Eclectic Masonic Federation 1783, the Grand Lodge of Prussia called the Royal York for friendship 1798, the Grand Lodge of Hamburg 1811, the Grand Landlodge of Saxony 1811, and the Grand Masonic Lodge "Concord (Zur Eintracht)" in 1846.

== Attempts at unification ==
From 1801, at the suggestion of Friedrich Ludwig Schröder, lodges from the various Grand Lodges started to found "lodge clubs". In the first association of its kind, the Provincial Grand Lodge of Hamburg met with the Grand Lodge of Hanover and the Grand Lodge Royal York of Friendship. The "Masonic Society of the Three Grand Lodges of Berlin", comprising the Grand National Mother Lodge "the Three Globes", the Grand Landlodge and the Grand Lodge "Royal York" was founded on the same model in 1810. The Hamburg club focused more on the content of scientific questions, the Berliners were more concerned with administrative aspects of their Grand Lodge. The Berlin club became dormant in 1823. In 1839 the "Grand Masters Club of the three Old Prussian Grand Lodges" was formed in its place, which existed until 1935. A close cooperation between the Berlin Grand Lodges developed from this.

The first truly Germany-wide association was an association of German grandmasters, founded in 1868 by Gustav Heinrich Warnatz, the Grand Master of the Grand Lodge of Saxony for life. It met in Berlin in the lodge of the Three Globes. Further meetings took place in 1869 in Dresden, 1870 in Hamburg, 1871 in Frankfurt a. M. and again in 1872 in Berlin. As Germany unified, these meetings formed the "Federation of German Grand Lodges" (Deutscher Großlogenbund), formulated in 1871 and officially founded on 19 May 1872. This comprised the eight German Grand Lodges recognised by the United Grand Lodge of England, being the Grand National Motherlodge "The Three Globes", the Grand Landlodge of Freemasons of Germany, the Grand Lodge of Prussia called the Royal York for friendship, the Grand Land of Saxony, the Grand Lodge of Hamburg, the Grand Lodge of the Sun, the Grand Masonic lodge "Zur Eintracht" and the Grand Mother Lodge of the Eclectic Masonic Federation. No binding decisions could be made by the federation. The organisation was collaborative rather than authoritative, and few joint statements could be made. In 1874 they found that race and skin color are not a criterion for the rejection of membership. They produced an aim to establish a National Grand Lodge of all German Freemasons in 1880, and in 1897 recognised Anderson's charges. In 1903, the Grande Loge de France was recognized as the regular Grand Lodge of France. In 1909, the Grand Orient de France was again recognised, against the wishes of the three old Prussian Grand Lodges, who supported the United Grand Lodge of England's rejection of the new French constitutions in 1877. After World War I of the German Grand Lodges mediated the distribution of humanitarian aid to needy women and children from the Grand Lodges of England, the USA and neutral countries. On the 50th anniversary, in 1922, the three Berlin Grand Lodges left the federation as the rift between the three Christian Berlin Grand Lodges and the "humanitarian" Grand Lodges widened. The organisation was further weakened when the Great Lodge of Saxony left. The remainder of the organization was to continue until 1935 and the forced dissolution of the German Grand Lodges.

== Germany after the First World War ==
In the Weimar Republic Jews and Freemasons were the preferred objects of right-wing propaganda. Emigrants such as the Baltic German Alfred Rosenberg brought the fictional Protocols of the Elders of Zion to Western and Central Europe. He published writings such as "The crime of Freemasonry, Judaism, Jesuitism, German Christianity" (1921). His theme was the theory of Jewish/Masonic conspiracy, that it was bent on undermining the existence of other nations. To this end, the Freemasons and the Jews had caused the Russian Revolution. Therefore, capitalism and communism were only apparent opposites, in truth they were one and the same pincer movement, caused by international Jewry and their aspirations of world domination. High finance was the mistress of the labour movement in all countries. Rosenberg's comments on the protocols' in 1923 were a publishing success, invoked by Hitler in Mein Kampf.

The former military chief Erich Ludendorff successfully propagated the Stab-in-the-back myth. This stated that Germany could have been victorious, had not greater powers insidiously undermined the "heroic struggle of the German people". His wife Mathilde authored writings on the "supranational powers" which existed, Jews, Jesuits and Freemasons in an international network formed for the purpose of gaining and maintaining power. Hitler and his followers adopted much of Ludendorff's anti-Masonic conspiracy theory.

== Suppression 1933–1945 ==
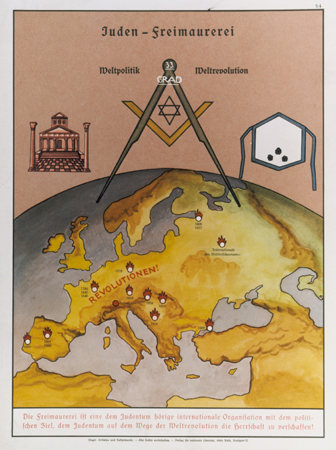
Jewish-Masonic conspiracy: A poster from the series 'Heredity and Race Science' (1935)

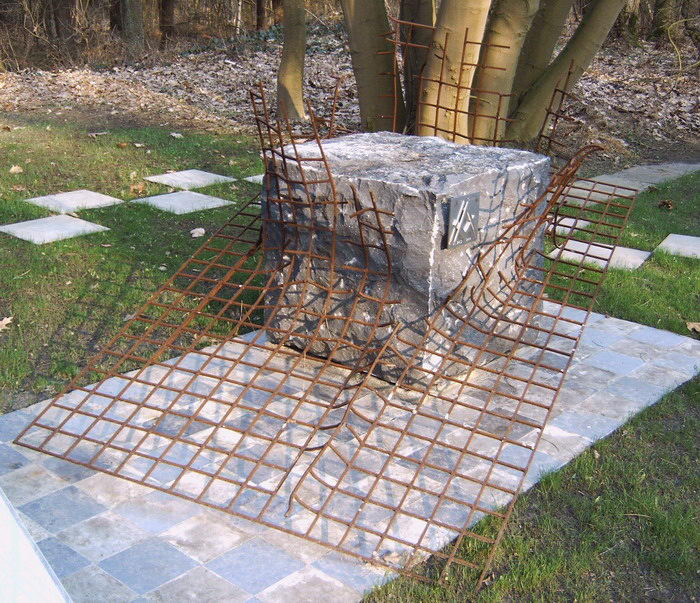
Memorial to Liberté chérie in Esterwegen

When the Enabling Act of 1933 placed power in the hands of Hitler, the Humanitarian lodges, which all admitted Jews and had cosmopolitan ideals, voluntarily dissolved themselves. The three old Prussian Grand Lodges, exclusively Christian in membership, continued to protest their patriotism in an effort to stay open. The Sturmabteilung had already removed files from the Three Globes at gunpoint. After unsuccessful attempts to address the impossibility of a Judaeo-Masonic conspiracy in lodges that did not admit Jews, Lieut. Col. von Heeringen of the Landesloge obtained an audience with Hermann Göring. Apparently as a result of this, the three remaining Grand Lodges severed all international relations, ceased all ritual work, and removed from their titles all reference to Freemasonry and lodges. In January 1934, a new decree made it impossible for Masons who had joined the Nazi party after the previous January to become or remain party members. Those who joined before were allowed to remain in the rank and file, but never expect promotion. The dissolution of all lodges was eventually ordered in May 1935.

In the next decade lodge Liberté Chérie was briefly established in hut 6 of Esterwegen concentration camp. In November 1943 seven Freemasons, who were Nacht und nebel prisoners from the Belgian resistance, formed a lodge which initiated another intern and accepted two more members. Within a year movement of inmates dissolved the lodge. Only three of the ten members survived the war. Masonic activity has also been reported in 14 prisoner of war camps. These meetings, composed of "regular" masons, did not feel empowered to initiate or confer degrees without a Grand Lodge warrant, and often took the form of lodges of instruction; time was frequently spent trying to remember ritual.

== Freemasonry in postwar Germany ==
After the fall of the Nazi regime, the first meetings of Freemasons were probably the Square and Compass clubs of British, American and Canadian servicemen. By the end of the 1940s, some of these were obtaining warrants and operating as lodges, as German Freemasons were reforming their old lodges, and beginning to reconstitute German Grand Lodges. Freemasonry in the Soviet occupied areas of Germany, which later became known as the DDR - Deutsche Demokratische Republik (German Democratic Republic) was forbidden.

=== Vereinigte Großlogen von Deutschland (VGLvD) ===
Regular masonry (also known as Anglo-American Freemasonry) was not only practiced by occupying forces. Some elements of original German Freemasonry had managed to survive in exile in Jerusalem and Chile. In West Germany, the 174 Lodges of all the previous German Grand Lodges unified on 19 June 1949 to form the United Grand Lodge of Germany - which today is the Großloge der Alten Freien und Angenommenen Maurer von Deutschland (see below). However, the Große Landesloge der Freimaurer von Deutschland and the Große National-Mutterloge „Zu den drei Weltkugeln“ decided to continue in their own traditional way.

Several years followed during which all attempts at further unification proved futile. However, with the powerful assistance of the United Grand Lodge of England, on 27 April 1958 a unique entity in the history of German Freemasonry came into being, namely the United Grand Lodges of Germany (Vereinigte Großlogen von Deutschland). This came about as a result of the unification of the Großloge der Alten Freien und Angenommenen Maurer von Deutschland and the Große Landesloge der Freimaurer von Deutschland. In order to achieve this, it was agreed that the latter would retain all but two of its rights of sovereignty - the two rights which were ceded were the representation of German Freemasons to all foreign organisations and representation to the public world. In 1970 the Große National-Mutterloge Zu den drei Weltkugeln, as well as the Grand Land Lodge of British Freemasons in Germany and the American Canadian Grand Land Lodge joined and then finally in 1980, the British and American-Canadian Grand Land Lodges were each granted the title of Grand Lodge in their own right, completing the current VGLvD as a union of five sovereign independent Grand Lodges and the official mouthpiece of German Freemasonry.

==== Großloge der Alten Freien und Angenommenen Maurer von Deutschland ====
Founded on 19 June 1949 as Vereinigte Großloge von Deutschland (United Grand Lodge of Germany), from the Frankfurt association of masonic lodges and the Symbolic Grand Lodge operating in exile in Jerusalem. Together with the Grand Landlodge, it formed the United Grand Lodges of Germany in 1958. To avoid confusion, it changed its name twice, first to Große Landesloge der Alten Freien und Angenommenen Maurer von Deutschland, and finally in 1970 to Großloge der Alten Freien und Angenommenen Maurer von Deutschland (Grand Lodge of Ancient Free and Accepted Masons of Germany). It remains Germany's largest masonic obedience.

==== Große Landesloge der Freimaurer von Deutschland ====
Re-established soon after the end of the Second World War, the Grand Landlodge of the Freemasons of Germany is distinguished from the other regular German Grand Lodges by its adherence to the Swedish Rite.

==== Große National-Mutterloge „Zu den drei Weltkugeln“ ====
Reconstituted in 1946, but initially confined to the American sector in Berlin, the Grand National Mother Lodge, "The Three Globes" adheres to "Rectified Masonry", descended from the system developed in the Rite of Strict Observance.

==== Grand Lodge of British Freemasons in Germany ====
Originating in the British Military, the GL-BFG Grand Lodge of British Freemasons in Germany works the ritual of the Emulation Lodge of Improvement as approved by the United Grand Lodge of England (UGLE). In 1959 the first three British lodges in Germany became a district within the Grand Lodge AF & AM of Germany, but soon gained provincial status in 1962. In 1970 it became autonomous and acquired the name Grand Land Lodge of British Freemasons in Germany finally gaining its current name in 1980.

==== American Canadian Grand Lodge ====
Like the British masons, the first North American lodges were composed of military personnel who obtained warrants from home. However, in 1954 the first warrant was obtained from the Grand Lodge of Ancient Free and Accepted Masons of Germany, and in 1955 there were nine such lodges, which became a province. Independence followed as the American Canadian Grand Lodge.

=== Women's Freemasonry ===
==== Frauen-Grossloge von Deutschland ====
The Women's Grand Lodge of Germany started life in 1949 as a women's masonic association To Humanity (Zur Humanität) under the protection of the Großloge der Alten Freien und Angenommenen Maurer von Deutschland. The association became an independent Grand Lodge in 1982.

=== Liberal and mixed lodges ===
==== Le Droit Humain - Deutsche Jurisdiktion ====
The oldest mixed lodge in Germany was the Le Droit Humain lodge Goethe zum flammenden Stern (Goethe of the Blazing Star), formed in 1921 in Frankfurt, dissolved in 1933, and reformed on 20 November 1949. Droit Humain now has three lodges in Germany.

==== Humanitas - Freimaurergrossloge für Männer und Frauen in Deutschland ====
This Grand Lodge was formed when lodges of the Droit Humain felt the need for an independent German form of mixed masonry that was not governed from Paris. The oldest Droit Humain lodge, Goethe of the Blazing Star in Frankfurt am Main, left in February 1959. After Goethe's daughter lodge defected in the same year, Humanitas was formed at a convention in Frankfurt attended by 28 male and female masons. It now has 13 lodges.

==== Souveräner GrossOrient von Deutschland (SGOvD) ====
The most recent of the German Grand Lodges, the Sovereign Grand Orient was founded in October 2002, and settled a year later in Offenbach am Main. It describes itself as an umbrella organisation for Liberal Freemasonry in Germany. It has six lodges, Phoenix being a travelling lodge, and Terra Australis based in Adelaide.

==== International Mixed Masonic Grand Lodge LIBERTAS ====
On 2 October 2021 the delegation of the Grand Orient of Poland led by the Honorable Grand Master Tadeusz Andrzejewski, performed the Lighting of the Lights ceremony and presentation of the Patent of this new Grand Lodge.
