= Grand Lodge of British Freemasons in Germany =

- Region served: Germany
- Website: gl-bfg.org

The Grand Lodge of British Freemasonry in Germany (GL BFG) is a Masonic Grand Lodge in Germany working in the English language and following English Masonic traditions. It was founded as a District Lodge in 1957 and after various transformations (see below) was eventually recognised as Grand Lodge in 1980. This Grand Lodge is one of the five United Grand Lodges of Germany (VGLvD). It currently has members from a variety of nations and in addition to the "resident members" in Germany, there are "non-resident members" all over the world. Currently, 19 lodges work under the GL BFG, mainly in North Rhine-Westphalia, but also in Lower Saxony, Hamburg, Munich, Berlin and also near Frankfurt.

== Ritual ==
As with the other four Grand Lodges under the United Grand Lodges of Germany, the GL BFG is autonomous in matters of internal order and ritual. Of the Lodges of the GL BFG, 16 work in the English tradition with memorised English ritual texts using the ritual of the Emulation Lodge of Improvement as approved by the United Grand Lodge of England (UGLE), one works a Scottish Ritual and there are two lodges which uses the aforementioned Emulation Ritual, but translated into the German language and consequently these Lodges work in the German language. The GL BFG also supports separate Masonic orders (e.g. Mark, Royal Arch Chapter) of nearly all the rituals of English Freemasonry.

== History ==
The GL BFG, like the American Canadian Grand Lodge of Ancient Free & Accepted Masonry (ACGL), was originally a military Masonic organisation for members of the Allied Forces in West Germany and was established as a district of the Grand Lodge AF & AM in 1957.

In 1959, the District Grand Lodge of British Freemasons in Germany was founded and was raised to a Provincial Grand Lodge under the GL AF & AM of Germany in 1962. It then became an autonomous Provincial Grand Lodge and equal partner within the United Grand Lodges of Germany in 1970 and one year later changed its name to Grand Land Lodge of British Freemasons in Germany. In 1980 the name was again changed to the Grand Lodge of British Freemasons in Germany. In 2022 the name was once again changed, this time to Grand Lodge of British Freemasonry in Germany as it was felt that as time has past, the Grand Lodge no longer supported a predominately British membership, but more of an international participation and therefore decided that the word Freemasons alone no longer reflected its overall aim. As such it was decided and agreed that it was British Freemasonry along with its ritual and members that it supported Germany.

== Relationship to other Grand Lodges ==
As a member of the United Grand Lodges of Germany (VGLvD), the GL BFG has ceded the sovereignty rights of representation to Freemasons outside of Germany and to the German public to the VGLvD and does not formally have direct relations with any Masonic body outside Germany. The VGLvD is recognised as a "regular" Grand Lodge by the United Grand Lodge of England (UGLE). Through the VGLvD, it recognises the existence of the Women's Grand Lodge of Germany (Frauen Grossloge von Deutschland, FGLvD); however, other male organizations purporting to be Masonic lodges, that are not part of the VGLvD within Germany are not recognised.

The other four United Grand Lodges of Germany, which have widely varying traditions, are

- Grand Lodge of Ancient Free and Accepted Masons of Germany (Großloge der Alten Freien und Angenommenen Maurer von Deutschland, GL AFuAMvD)
- Grand Landlodge of the Freemasons of Germany (Große Landesloge der Freimaurer von Deutschland/ Freimaurerorden, GLL FvD/ FO)
- Große National-Mutterloge „Zu den drei Weltkugeln“ Grand National-Mother Lodge, "The Three World-Globes" (GNML 3WK)
- American Canadian Grand Lodge A.F. & A.M (ACGL)

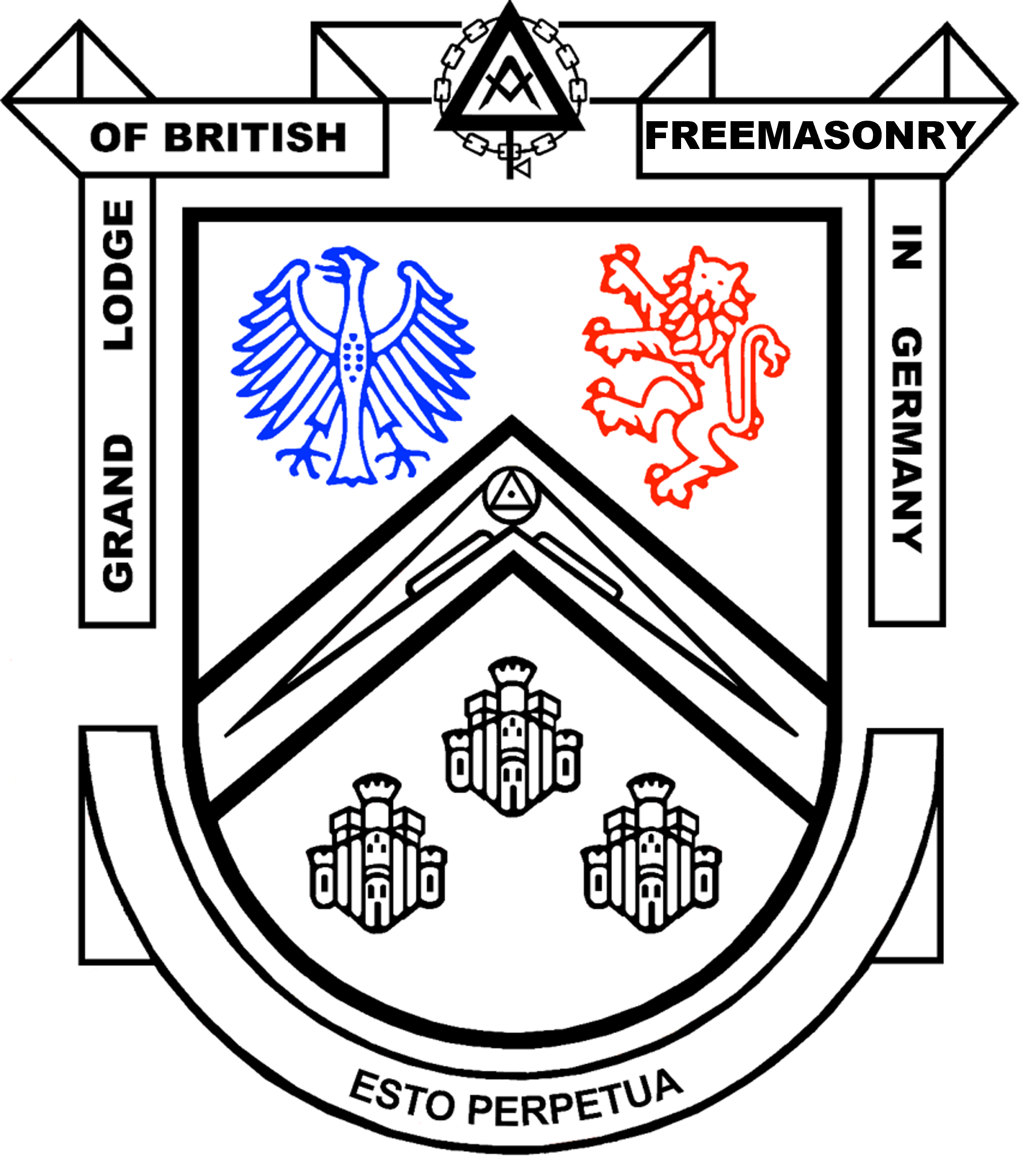
Seal of Grand Lodge of British Freemasonry in Germany which was changed from Grand Lodge of British Freemasons in Germany in 2022 to reflect how the Grand Lodge focus has changed from supporting British Freemasons to supporting and promoting British Freemasonry as a whole and felt that the old title was out dated in a modern society and could give the false impression of partiality.

== Seal ==
The seal of the Grand Lodge of British Freemasonry in Germany is a combination of images relevant to its early beginnings and whom it represents. Initially created using the seal of the United Grand Lodge of Ancient Free & Accepted Masons of Germany by Past Grand Master Theodor Vogel (31.07.1901 – 09.02.1977), Grand Master of the United Grand Lodges of Germany, It was combined with seal of the Grand Land Lodge of the Freemasons Order by adding a triangle and a key, to symbolise a trowel, to the lower chain link. The three sections of the chain represent "three times three" frequently found in German freemasonry. This seal is placed top & center to represent its seniority. Sitting below the seal are the images of the German Federal Eagle, to the left and a Lion representing United Kingdom to the right. Centrally placed are compass's, by which freemasons, symbolically, measure their life and conduct. The three castles represent, and are a reminder to, the original Provincial Grand Lodge of British Freemasons in Germany (1962 - 1971). The Latin moto ESTO PERPETUA means "Let it be Perpetual" but is here used in the form of "May it last forever".

== Constituent lodges under GL BFG ==
- New Albion Lodge No. 841 - Hamburg (Previously known since its consecration on 30 March 1957 as New Absalom Lodge No.841 located in Gütersloh. Changed to maintain peace and harmony and to avoid confusion with Hamburg established Lodge "Absalom zu den drei Nesseln Nr.1" after moving to its new location. Decided on 28 Apr 2020 & effective as of 1 Sep 2020 as per edict released by the current Grand Master Most Worshipful Brother Glyn Vincent Edmonds)
- Saxony Lodge No. 842 - Celle
- Britannia Lodge No. 843 - Bielefeld
- Phoenix Lodge No. 847 - Berlin
- Anglo Hanseatic Lodge No. 850 - Hamburg
- Star of Saxony Lodge No. 853 - Mönchengladbach – Rheindahlen
- Keys of Münster Lodge No. 881 - Münster
- Beaver Lodge No. 885 - Soest
- Doric Lodge No. 886 - Osnabrück
- Bond of Friendship Lodge No. 890 - Bonn
- Lodge Niederrhein Lodge No. 892 - Düsseldorf
- The Rose of Minden Lodge No. 918 - Herford
- Bridge of Fellowship Lodge No. 929 - Hanover (Hannover)
- Lodge Neuhaus No. 946 - Paderborn
- Southern Star Lodge No. 1025 - Munich (München)
- Thistle & Saltire Lodge No. 1040 - Berlin & Osnabrück
- Kurt Tucholsky Lodge No. 1060 - Münster
- Corinthian Lodge No. 1111 - Frankfurt
- Brothers of Hiram Lodge No. 1101 - Traveling Lodge

== Constituent lodge briefs ==
=== Saxony Lodge Number 842 ===
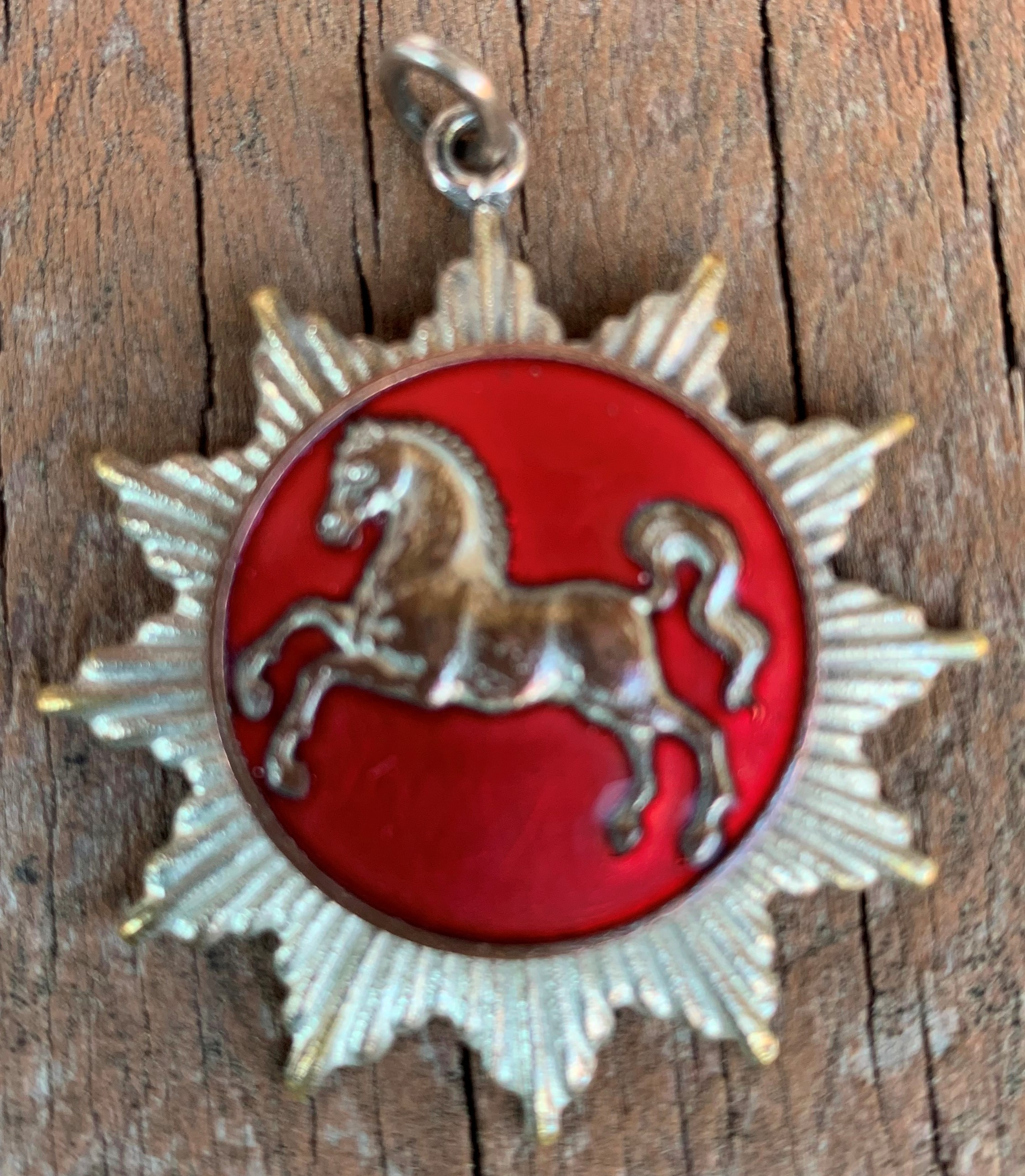
Saxony Lodge 842 Jewel

The beginnings of Saxony Lodge No.842 can be tracked back to 1953 when the Hannover Branch was affiliated to the Association of British Freemasons. This association and its various branches became a focal point of masonic instruction and learning which enhanced interest and membership, the Hannover Branch well exceeded thirty in number and it made meeting in the homes of its members impossible and so a committee were tasked with finding a suitable location. Stirling House (Kurt Schumacher Kaserne) in Hannover, the headquarters of Hannover and Hamburg districts, was used for the majority of meetings. Furniture was acquired from surplus held by the British Army and ingenious craftsmen produced folding tables and other lodge furnishings that made holding lodges of instruction easier. Meetings were held once a month, but no regular day was found due to Stirling house being in use by the military, the British Military Hospital in Hannover was used when Stirling House was unavailable.

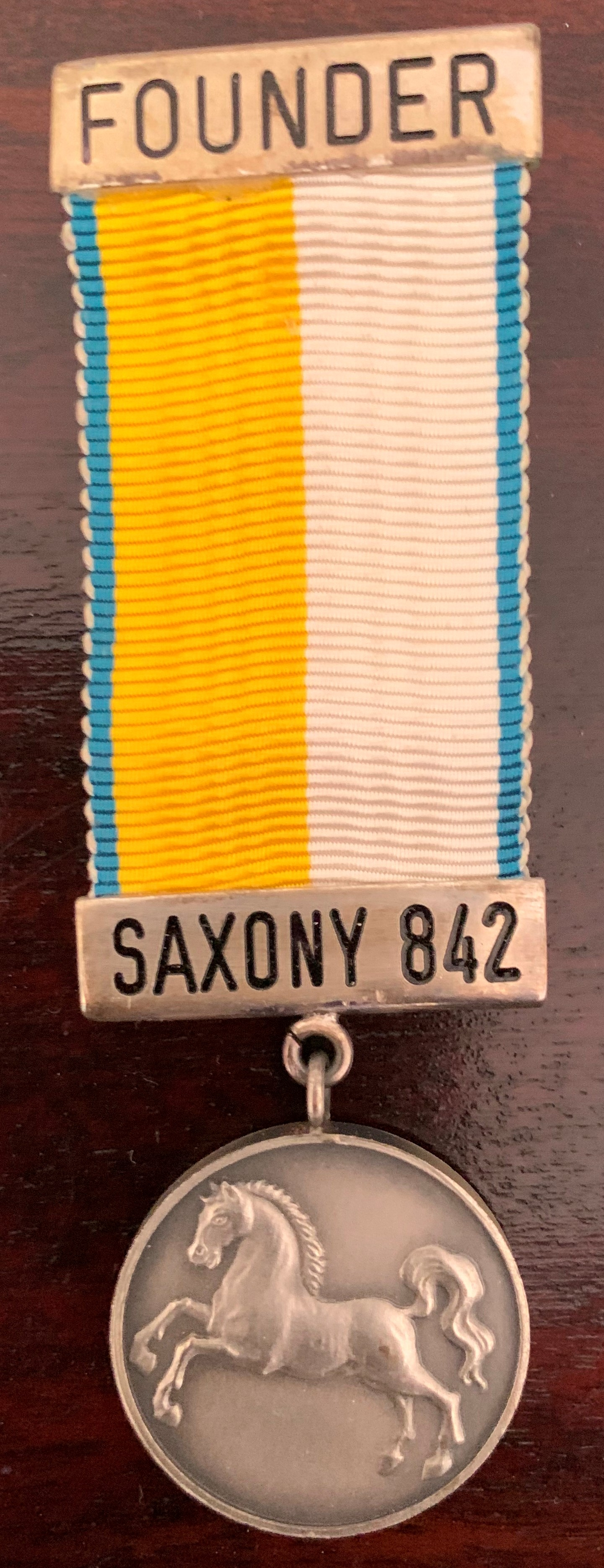
Saxony Lodge 842 Founders Jewel

At these meetings the only permanent officers were preceptor, secretary and treasurer, no members were allowed to hold office for more than one meeting. The meetings only consisted of opening, closing and ceremony rehearsals, these were so popular that there was a waiting list for the lodge offices. These meetings continued until 1957, when the news was received that fraternal relations had been restored between the United Grand Lodge of England and the German masonic constitutions. Permission was applied for to form a lodge under the German constitution with dispensation to conduct business and ceremonies, using Emulation Ritual, in the English language. This application was sent to the Grand Master of Ancient and Free Accepted Masons.

Saxony Lodge No.842 was consecrated im May 1957, the hard work and perseverance of the founding members laid the foundation to a lodge that is still has a strong presence in Celle. Today the lodge works under the framework of the Grand Lodge of British Freemasonry in Germany, one of the five partner Grand Lodges that make the United Grand Lodges of Germany. The lodge has evolved from a lodge membership of predominantly British servicemen to an international lodge with members of many nations.

==== Lodge seal ====
The Lodge Seal/ Jewel ("Jewel" is the term used within masonry to describe an ornament worn on the chest or around the neck on a collar, typically displaying the Lodge crest or seal) is dominated by the rearing stallion that is represented widely within Niedersachsen (Lower Saxony) and stands proudly on the Niedersachsen flag. The Founders Jewel has the added ribbon of yellow and white which represents the colors of Celle, where are lodge was founded in 1957. Copies of which are held in the Celle town archives along with the consecration summons.

==== Lodge house ====
It was through the recommendation Grand Master of Ancient and Free Accepted Masons that the Lodge house in Magnus Strasse 2a, Celle could be used as the permanent masonic home of Saxony Lodge No.842.

==== Ritual ====
The lodge practices its masonic ritual in the English language following the English constitution provided by the United Grand Lodge of England

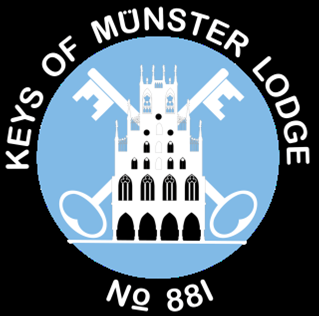
The Keys of Münster Lodge No.881 Seal

=== The Keys of Münster Lodge Number 881 ===
The Keys of Münster Lodge No. 881 was consecrated on 13 January 1962 as a Lodge within the then Provincial Grand Lodge of British Freemasons in Germany. The Consecration took place in the Masonic Temple belonging to the local German Lodge "Zu den Drey Balken" (consecrated on 3 October 1778) in Münster. There has always been close relationship between the two Lodges that has continued and indeed strengthened over the year’s right up to the present time. In Masonic terms the lodge name "Keys of Münster", was appropriately chosen as it represents the friendship and bond between Freemasons. Several British Brethren of the Lodge "Keys of Munster" No. 881 becoming dual members of the Lodge "Zu den Drey Balken" No. 127.

==== Lodge seal ====
The Lodge seal/jewel depicts the Town of Münster with the crossed Keys incorporated into it. It is a combination of the crossed keys logo of the 2nd Infantry Division, who were part of the British Army of the Rhein (BAOR), stationed in Münster and the local Münster Town Hall (Rathaus) logo, combining the City of Münster and the British Military with Freemasonry universal.

==== Lodge house ====
Is located at Diepenbrockstraße 30, 48145 Münster Germany.

==== Ritual ====
The lodge practices its masonic ritual in the English language following the English constitution provided by the United Grand Lodge of England

=== The Rose of Minden Lodge Number 918 ===
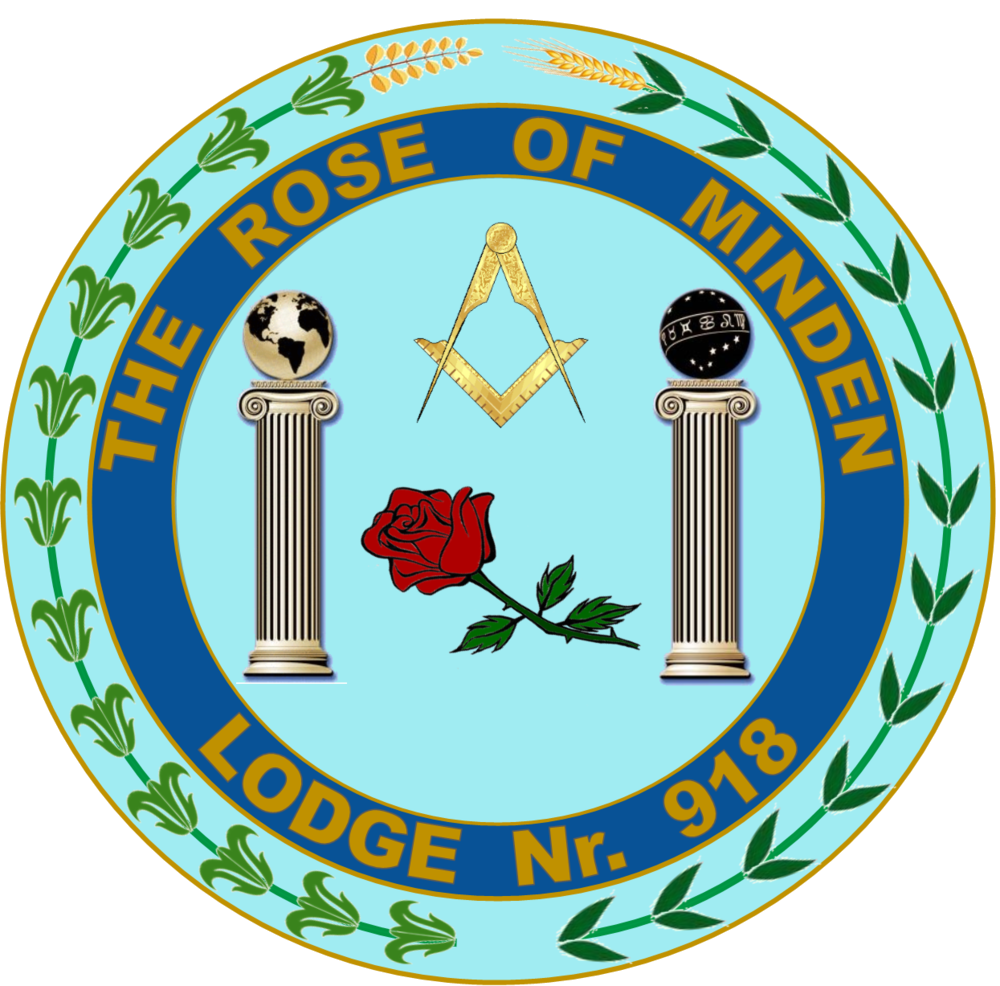
The Rose of Minden Lodge Nr.918 Seal

The Rose of Minden Lodge was originally established as a military Masonic organisation to provide a masonic home for members of the British Allied Forces in and around the German city of Minden, North Rhine-Westphalen. On 24 Jun 1972 it was discussed at a meeting of the Royal Electrical & Mechanical Engineers (REME) Officers Mess, Johansen Str 1, in Minden, the possibility of forming a Lodge in the Minden area. This was agreed and a petition was raised and passed to the Land Grand Master for review. It was agreed that a local Minden Lodge would be used for the regular meetings. It was also agreed that the founding Lodge Officers purchased their own regalia and collars and then subsequently present it as a gift to the Lodge for future officers to use. At a further meeting on 5 September 1972, which took place at Suffolk School, Elizabeth Barracks, Minden, the consecration would take place at 1100Hrs in the Temple of the local Herford German Lodge "Zur Roten Erde" Unter den Linden 34, on 28 October 1972 in the city of Herford. This location was chosen for the consecration meeting as the agreed new home for the Rose of Minden Lodge was at the time a small building consisting of just two rooms and renovations would not be completed in sufficient time for the founding ceremony. In 1990, once the cold war had finished, the 1990 Options for Change Strategic Defence Review reduced the number of British Forces in Germany and withdrew out of Minden. As a result, the Lodge decided to move its seat from the city of Minden to an area where British Forces were still deployed in Germany and in turn returned to its founding ceremony location in Herford, which from 1993 also became the home of 1st UK Armoured Division.

Freemason lodges typically choose titles in relation to their founding location, to a masonic theme or character. The Rose of Minden title was suggested by Brother B Potter and as such was used to publicise the founding of the Lodge to Freemasons in the surrounding area by an article in the local Minden Bulletin. The apt title is taken from the battle honour which was awarded to British Army units who fought in the Battle of Minden on 1 August reflecting its military connection at the time of its founding. This battle honour is still a celebrated tradition with units of the British Army today.

In 2010 under the UK's "Strategic Defence and Security Review," (SDR) the deployment of British forces in Germany was announced to be ended by 2020 and the withdrawal of 20,000 service personnel started to take place. Late in 2019 it was announced that a small contingent would remain in Germany to act as a forward base in support of UK's role within NATO. The personnel will remain located at the 45-square mile (117-square kilometer) Sennelager Training Area near Paderborn which provides extensive live firing and training facilities. Mönchengladbach will keep Ayrshire Barracks which can store approximately 2000 vehicles. The Wulfen Munitions Storage Facility will remain open for the storage of operational ammunition. Finally, an Engineer unit equipped with M3, self-propelled amphibious bridging vehicles will remain co-located with German troops supporting the NATO infrastructure in Minden.

The natural catchment area for new members for the Lodge was traditionally the military units that were stationed in the surrounding areas of Herford, Minden, Bad Oeynhausen and Bielefeld. This had a dramatic effect on membership with the changes announced in the 2010 SDR. However, as British forces have been located in Germany for 75 years it naturally followed that a number of those decided to stay after their military service and according to the German Statistics Office "Destatis" the number of British ex-patriots living in North Rhine-Westphalen in 2017 was 25,125.

With Freemasonry in Germany growing steadily in numbers and becoming ever more popular since the second world war, it was noted that as well as a number of expats joining, German and other European nationals were also applying for membership. This unusual and unexpected turn in events was found to be the increased interest in conducting masonic emulation and ceremonies in the English language rather than that of their own. This large number of expats and other nationals has enabled the Lodge and similar Lodges to survive the recent troop withdrawal.

==== Lodge seal ====
The seal of the lodge is a combination of images relevant to its identity and masonic connections. Bordering the seal are an ear of corn and a sprig of acacia, the ear of corn representing plenty and the sprig of acacia to represent Hiram Abiff, a central character within masonic history. Within the border is the name of the lodge and its warranted lodge number. The abbreviation for word number is not written as No. as would be expected but as Nr. showing its German heritage. Centrally placed are a red rose and the combined image of an architect's square & compasses. The rose, as the lodge name suggests, represents the Rose of Minden and the square & compasses is the most recognisable symbol within freemasonry. Two pillars are placed either side of the rose and square & compasses, these represent the two pillars placed outside of King Solomon's temple, again, key objects within masonic history. Atop the pillars are two spheres showing terrestrial and celestial maps representing that freemasonry is seen by masons as being universal.

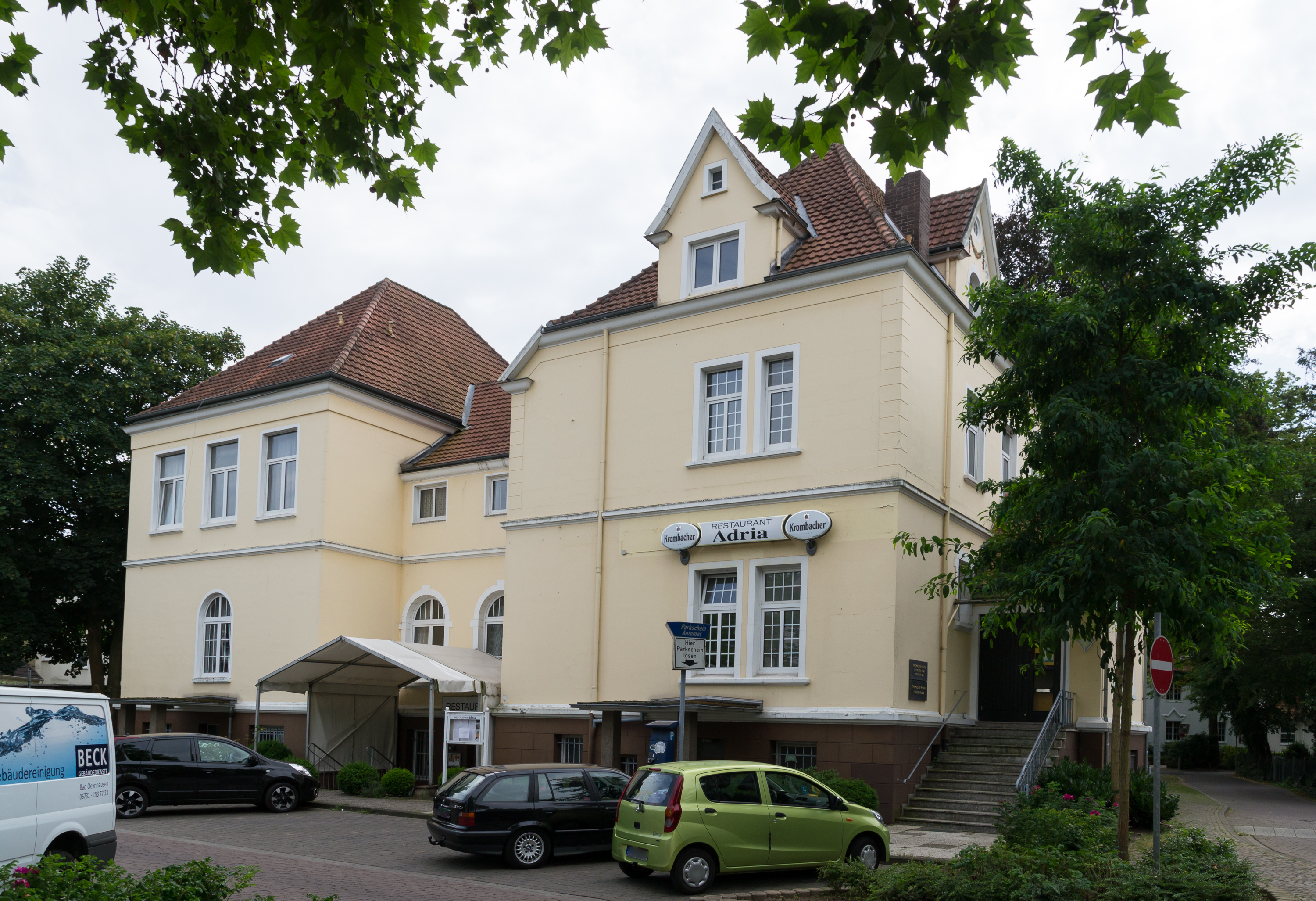
Lodge House used by The Rose of Minden Lodge. A listed building, built in 1907. City of Herford

==== Lodge house ====
The listed Lodge building was built in two phases by the architect and Freemason Wilhelm Köster(1860–1946). The first phase started in 1906 and completed 29 July 1907 which was opened with large celebrations and attended by masonic visitors from as far as Berlin totaling 177 guests. The second phase was completed in 1924 where accommodation was created on the first floor for lodge members to reside if needed. It has remained the home of the 1899-founded German Lodge Zur Roten Erde who are responsible for the complete building project. The costs of land at 12,000 German Mark and building costs of 42,000 German Mark partly provided from lodge savings and a loan from the district Sparkasse bank. In 1935, Freemasonry was outlawed by Nazis, and the building was taken over by the Nazi Party who replaced a large pentagram symbol on the exterior of the building with an eagle and swastika. From 1937 to 1945 the building served as the district headquarters of the Nazi Party who also used the surrounding buildings of Logenplatz for accommodation. In 1946 the building was returned to Lodge Zur Roten Erde who own and manage the building to this day. The layout of the building has changed little since its completion. The ground floor holds a large entrance with en-suite washrooms, reception/ dining room and the lodge temple itself. The first floor provides conference, practice, storage rooms and living accommodation. The cellar, which originally held the lodge kitchen, wine cellar and wood store is now a used as a restaurant. Five local lodges from East(ern) Westphalia-Lippe (Ostwestfalen-Lippe (OWL)) regularly share the building for masonic meetings.

==== Ritual ====
The lodge practices its masonic ritual in the English language following the English constitution provided by the United Grand Lodge of England

=== Beaver Lodge Number 885 ===
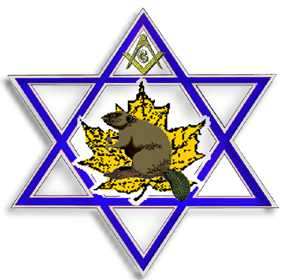
Beaver Lodge No.885 Seal

The "Five Points Club", founded on 11 December 1956 by Canadian soldiers stationed in Germany, are the seeds of what became Beaver Lodge No 885, which was founded under the premise of continuing the community of Freemasons among those serving in Germany. On 11 June 1962 it was agreed to found a regular Lodge under the name "Beaver Lodge" under the grouping of British Lodges in Germany.

On 16 March 1963, the Lodge was consecrated in the Soester Lodge House by Most Worshipful Brother R Müller-Börner, the Grand Master of the Great National Lodge AF&AM. At this meeting, the RW Bro JP Railton was also appointed Provincial Grand Master of the new Provincial Grand Lodge of the British Freemasons in Germany. The Lodge resided at that time in the Soester Lodge House after the owners (German Lodge "Loge Zur Bundeskette") agreed to share the building for a very modest rent of only 60 DM per month. This relationship lasted for about 20 years before the Lodge was forced into being a traveling lodge and then sub-sequentially to premises in Werl.

Canadian unification went into effect on 1 February 1968 & the Royal Canadian Navy, Canadian Army, and Royal Canadian Air Force were reorganised into a single entity known as the Canadian Armed Forces, or simply Canadian Forces (CF). At about the same time, Canadian manpower was cut as new defense priorities were announced. The NATO brigade was reduced from a peak in the mid-1960s of 6,700 troops in size down to 2,800 men. After years of very happy garrison life in the vicinity of Soest, the entire brigade was moved in December 1970 to southern Germany as part of a centralised Canadian Forces Europe contingent. January 1970 had seen the Lodge grow to a respectable strength of 97 members but this withdrawal threatened its existence and future

In 1968 relations with the resident German Lodge deteriorated beyond repair which led to Beaver Lodge being asked to leave. This situation forced Beaver Lodge into becoming a traveling Lodge with no permanent location that could be called the Lodge seat. This situation for the Lodge, although interesting became a heavy burden and led to a considerable deterioration in member strengths, despite help from regional German Lodges to keep it running, especially the Lodges in Hamm and Dortmund.

In order to return the Lodge to a stable status, agreements were made in 1983 to meet regularly at the Park Hotel in Werl. With the search for a permanent Lodge home finally ended the relief of a finding a new location was marred by the sadness at having to leave their home city of Soest and the long relationship with the Lodge Zur Bundeskette, which had been so outstanding in its early years. This new temple in the Park Hotel Werl was inaugurated by the Grand Master RW Bro A Settle and Lodge meetings were held there regularly from then onward until the Lodge moved to the Stadthalle (City hall) Werl on 2 October 1999.

The beginning of the year 2004 saw the relationship to Soest and the Lodge Zur Bundeskette be re-established, and a positive course of discussions, the Lodge was able to move back into its old home in Roßkampffsgasse No.1 on 19 November 2004.

Since then the Lodge has continued to grow in membership and enjoys a very international positioning with members of Australian, Italian, Scottish, Northern Irish, Irish, German, Canadian and American origin, among others.

==== Lodge seal ====
The seal consists of a large hexagram containing square and compass's with letter ‘G’, a maple leaf and a beaver. The hexagram is said to have been found within the buildings of King Solomon's temple, from which the philosophies and studies of Freemasons said to be inspired. The Square and compass's with the letter ‘G’ denotes the Grand Geometrician of the Universe or God and can be seen in the upper triangle of the hexagram. The maple leaf representing its Canadian origins is placed centrally and a beaver from which the Lodge takes its name is placed upon the maple leaf.

==== Lodge house ====
The Lodge house located Rosskampfssgasse 1, Soest was built in the Middle Ages around 1500. Since then it has changed hands many times and survived historical events such as the 30 Years War, WW1 & WW2. On 14 September 1873 the local German Soester Lodge "Zur Bundeskette" acquired the building and in 1907/08 converted it to a full Lodge house with a great hall being built on as extension at the rear. In 1935 the Nazi party forced the Lodge to sell the building to the City of Soest and from 20 March 1936 the building was used by the Hitler Youth (Hitlerjugend) - Bann 123. On 1 July 1950 the building was returned to "Loge Zur Bundeskette". By 1968 the building was in need extensive repairs which were funded by selling the garden grounds and great hall which were turned into rented living accommodation. The building has been home of Beaver Lodge No.885 since 19 November 2004

==== Ritual ====
The lodge practices its masonic ritual in the English language following the English constitution provided by the United Grand Lodge of England

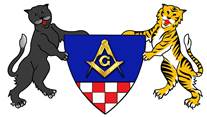
1060 Kurt Tucholsky Lodge Seal

=== Kurt Tucholsky Lodge No. 1060 ===
The Lodge Kurt Tucholsky was solemnly founded on 13 October 2013 by Brethren of the Grand Lodge of British Freemasonry in Germany and Brethren from other jurisdictions in Unna, their old home town.

After 9 years in the town of Unna, the Lodge looked for, and found, a new dedicated home to continue its Masonic work.

They are now located in Münster in the Lodge house Diepenbrockstrasse, Münster, where they share the purpose built building with other resident Lodges including owners of the building "Zu den Drey Balken Loge", which is 250 years old and has a long history.

==== Ritual ====
The Lodge practices its masonic ritual in the German language following the English constitution provided by the United Grand Lodge of England

=== Brothers of Hiram Lodge Number 1101 ===
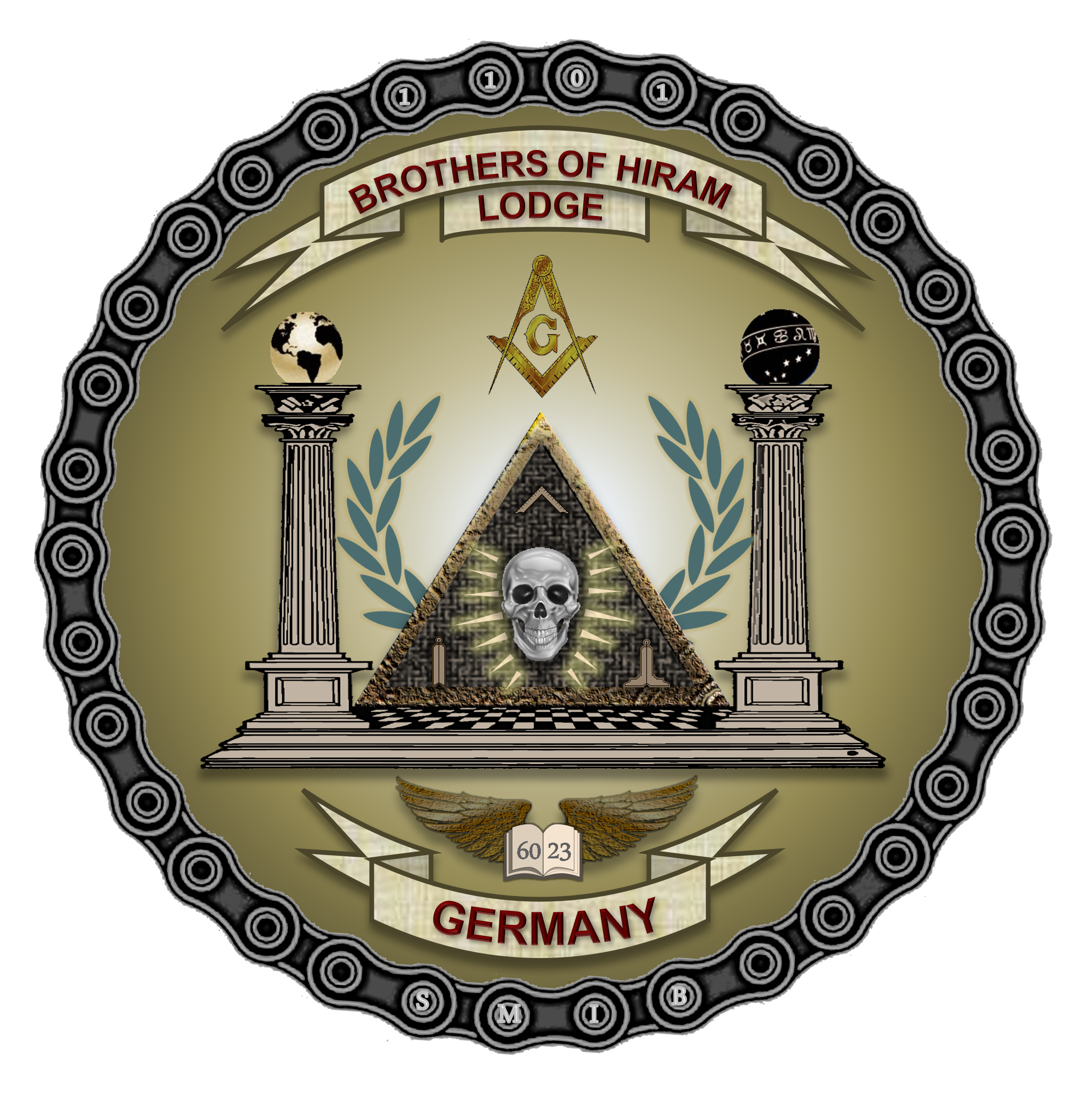
Brothers of Hiram Lodge No.1101 Seal

The Brothers of Hiram Lodge No.1101 is the first official motorcycle Freemasonry Lodge to be formed in Germany and was consecrated in Herford by the AGM RWBro Gary Wormald and officers of Grand Lodge of British Freemasonry Germany (GLBFG) on 15 July 2023 and was formed by 15 Founding members from within United Grand Lodges of Germany (VGLvD) and Luxemburg. A day which saw nearly 70 Brethren from across VGLvD, as well as visitors from Luxemburg, Bulgaria & Gibraltar attending the ceremony.

Rose of Minden Lodge 918's WBros Dave Chessell & Roy Charles had been long interested in forming a dedicated Lodge that could combine their love for Masonry and motorbikes and inspired after watching a UK TV series celebrating 300 years of Freemasonry in 2017 went about proceedings to go about establishing the first official motorcycle traveling Lodge in Germany under GLBFG. This process was drawn out and delayed heavily due to the Covid pandemic but once all hurdles had been passed and approval from GLBFG & VGLvD had been granted the Lodge was eventually consecrated on 15 July 2023 in The Rose of Minden's Mother Lodge in Herford.

The founding members are Master Mason Freemasons from across Grand Lodges under VGLvD who all share the same passion for Motorcycling and Freemasonry however are not to be mistaken for a motorcycle club (MC). Although there is also motorcycle Grand Chapter of The Widows Sons in Germany they are only able to Master Masons as members and unlike The Brothers of Hiram Lodge, are unable to accept new candidates as Entered Apprentice Freemasons and take these new candidates through the three degrees to complete their Masonic journey.

The Brothers of Hiram name was chosen as it relates to the fact that all Masons are seen as brothers of Hiram Abiff who was a widows son.

==== Lodge seal ====
The Square and Compasses high in the picture refers to Virtue and Wisdom and represent common tools as used by Architects the G reminds viewers of the most high and being at the Meridian, means that the sun never sets on freemasonry, being spread universally around the world. The Pillars depicted are at the entrance to King Solomons Temple are represented by the teachings in the First and Second Degree and the splendour of the works undertaken by the Masons at that time. The three-sided Triangle represents the three degrees of our Craft: Entered Apprentice, Fellow Craft, and Master Mason. The Square, the Level and the Plumb Rule, which represent the three principal officers of the lodge and are also symbolic of our working tools. The Skull is to remember the untimely death of Hiram Abiff, a skilled Artificer whose dedication in the building of King Solomons Temple symbolises the pursuit of knowledge to improve and demonstrate the skills Masons acquire. The Acacia branches adorn two sides of the Triangle reminding us of where Hiram Abiff was discovered after the search for him revealed his location. The shine around him reminds us of his brilliance and the respect from all on the Temple that was built under his direction it also represents the Master of the Lodge, who employs and instructs the Brethren in the Lodge. The wings and the Book of sacred text demonstrate personal freedom and liberty, ideas at the heart of every mason and the desire to learn to better oneself. The wings are also a common symbol throughout the motorcycling community and therefore display our motorsport heritage. The numbers on the Book of sacred text depicts the Masonic year in which the lodge was formed.

==== Lodge house ====
As the Brothers of Hiram are a Traveling Lodge, they have no "home" location. They meet at regular intervals at different locations around Germany using Lodge facilities and large furniture to carry out their meetings. Small items required to perform ceremonies are designed to be transported by motorbike.

Should a field camp be chosen as a site for a Lodge meeting then motorcycles are used for pedestals.

==== Lodge mission ====
The Lodge Mission is to promote Freemasonry and its values to the millions of motorcyclists across Germany and Europe with the aim to encouraging potential new candidates to join and introduce them into Freemasonry.

==== Ritual ====
The lodge practices its masonic ritual in the German language following the English constitution provided by the United Grand Lodge of England
