= United Grand Lodges of Germany =

Association of Freemasonry lodges

United Grand Lodges of Germany, Brotherhood of Freemasons
- Established: 27 April 1958
- Coordinates: 50.5001°N 8.1474°E
- Region served: Germany
- Website: United Grand Lodges of Germany

The United Grand Lodges of Germany (German: Vereinigte Großlogen von Deutschland or VGLvD) is an association (confederation) of the five Grand Lodges of Freemasons in Germany which are recognized as regular by the United Grand Lodge of England, and represents them all at an international level.

The organization claims to have approximately 470 lodges, all male, for a total of about 14,100 Masons (there is a separate Women's Grand Lodge of Germany and the two grand lodges recognize the existence of each other, though they have no official ties).

== Grand Lodges ==
The United Grand Lodges of Germany comprise five constituent lodges:

- Grand Lodge of Ancient Free and Accepted Masons of Germany (Großloge der Alten Freien und Angenommenen Maurer von Deutschland, GL AFuAMvD)
- Grand Landlodge of the Freemasons of Germany (Große Landesloge der Freimaurer von Deutschland, GLL FvD)
- Grand National Mother Lodge, "The Three Globes" (Große National-Mutterloge „Zu den drei Weltkugeln“), (GNML 3WK)
- Grand Lodge of British Freemasons in Germany (GL BFG)
- American Canadian Grand Lodge A.F. & A.M (ACGL)

Additionally, the United Grand Lodges of Germany adopted the two St. John's lodges with special responsibilities for Jacob de Molay of the Flaming Star the travelling lodge The White Lily and the research lodge Quatuor Coronati.

== Constitution ==
On 27 April 1958, the former United Grand Lodge of Germany (now the Grand Lodge of Ancient Free and Accepted Masons of Germany (GL AFuAMvD), founded on 19 June 1949 in St. Paul's Church in Frankfurt) and the Grand Landlodge of the Freemasons of Germany (German: Große Landesloge der Freimaurer von Deutschland (GLL FvD), formed in 1770) joined together in the Vereinigten Großlogen von Deutschland, Bruderschaft der Freimaurer (United Grand Lodges of Germany, Brotherhood of Freemasons) with a Magna Carta of German Freemasons. In 1970, the Grand National Mother Lodge, "The Three Globes" (German: Große National-Mutterloge „Zu den drei Weltkugeln“ (GNML 3WK), formed in 1740), the German District Grand Lodge of the United Grand Lodge of England (now the Grand Lodge of British Freemasons in Germany) and the American Canadian Provincial Grand Lodge (ACPGL AF & AM) also joined the United Grand Lodges of Germany under this Magna Carta.

The VGLvD represents German Freemasonry to foreign institutions (the other Grand Lodges) and the German public. The member Grand Lodges are autonomous in their internal affairs and in the manner of teaching.

Unlike other grand lodges of the Grand Master of VGLvD acts only as a representative. The decision-making body is the Senate which consists of five members of the GL AFuAMvD, three members of the GLLFvD and one member of each of the other three Grand Lodges.

== Grandmasters ==
- Theodor Vogel (1958–1959),
- Friedrich August Pinkerneil (1959–1960 and 1962–1963),
- Konrad Merkel (1960–1961),
- Richard Müller-Börner (1961–1962),
- Willi Schulz (1963–1965 and 1969–1970),
- Werner Römer, (1965–1966 and 1968–1969),
- Heinz Rüggeberg (1966–1968),
- Hans Gemünd (1970–1971),
- Hermann Kehlenbeck (1971–1972),
- Friedrich Heller (1972–1975),
- Walter Veit (1975–1976),
- Hans Werner Schneider (1976),
- Günther Gall (1976–1977),
- Bernhard Rohland (1977–1978),
- Jürgen Holtorf (1978–1985),
- Ernst Walter (1985–1991),
- Rainer J. Schicke (1991–1997),
- Alfred F. Koska (1997–2003),
- Klaus Horneffer (2003–2006),
- Klaus-M. Kott (2006–2009),
- Prof. Dr. Rüdiger Templin (2010-2015),
- Christoph Bosbach (2015-2021),
- Michael Volkwein (2021-present).
