= Regular Masonic jurisdiction =

Factor by which individual Grand Lodges judge whether to recognise one another

In Freemasonry, regularity is one of the factors by which individual Grand Lodges judge whether to recognise one another for the purposes of allowing formal interaction at the Grand Lodge level and visitation by members of other jurisdictions. Each individual Grand Lodge determines which other Grand Lodges it considers Regular. The standards for determining this are not uniform between Grand Lodges.

== Regularity and its origins ==
=== History ===
The Masonic Square and Compasses (found with or without the 'G')

There are a number of groupings of Masonic jurisdictions which consider themselves regular, and recognise others as regular, yet consider others to be irregular. There is no globally centralised Masonic organisational system, and therefore the criteria for regularity are not consistent across all Grand Lodges.

==== Ancients and “Moderns” ====
The concept of Regularity first appears in Payne's regulations, and was printed in Anderson's Constitutions in 1723. In regulation VIII we find –

- If any Set or Number of Masons shall take upon themselves to form a Lodge without the Grand-Master's Warrant, the regular Lodges are not to countenance them, or own them as fair Brethren and duly form’d, nor approve of their Acts and Deeds; but must treat them as Rebels, until they humble themselves, as the Grand-Master shall in his Prudence direct, and until he approve of them by his Warrant, which must be signify’d to the other Lodges, as the Custom is when a new Lodge is to be register’d in the List of Lodges.

The revisions published in the 1738 constitutions introduced the term Regular Lodge.

Arguments regarding what ought to constitute proper Freemasonry appear in the 1720s, when some lodges of the Premier Grand Lodge of England began to replace the old method of drawing the lodge symbols on the floor in chalk and charcoal with tape, tacked to the floor, and portable metal letters. This earned the new Grand Lodge the nickname of the Moderns. In 1735, the same Grand Lodge refused admission to the master and wardens of an Irish lodge, who claimed to be a deputation from the Grand Master of Ireland, unless they accepted the English constitution, which they refused. In 1751 the nucleus of a second Grand Lodge, which did not accept the innovations of the original, was formed. Their book of constitutions, the Ahiman Rezon of their Grand Secretary Laurence Dermott, suggests that the Moderns had now changed their passwords in alarm over masonic exposures printed in the 1730s, which would not allow their members admission into any lodges outside their own jurisdiction. The process of uniting of these two Grand Lodges began in 1809, when the Moderns set up a travelling Lodge of Promulgation to return their ritual to its "Ancient" form. This made possible the creation, in 1813, of the United Grand Lodge of England.

==== Landmarks of Freemasonry ====
Payne's 1720 regulations mention the necessity of maintaining the "old Land-Marks" of the order, but it was much later that anybody attempted to define them. It was not until 1858 that Albert Mackey published a list of 25 landmarks, which while not universally accepted, formed the basis of some American jurisdictions.

Attempts to formulate the basis of regularity came even later in England, and appear to have arisen from recognition of a new Grand Lodge in France, which had just split from the Grand Orient de France. A letter of 1913 from the new Grand Master of the Independent and Regular National Grand Lodge of France and of the French Colonies stated the obligations of his lodges as his claim to regularity.

1. While the Lodge is at work the Bible will always be open on the altar.
2. The ceremonies will be conducted in strict conformity with the Ritual of the "Regime Rectifié" which is followed by these Lodges, a Ritual which was drawn up in 1778 and sanctioned in 1782, and with which the Duke of Kent was initiated in 1792[47].
3. The Lodge will always be opened and closed with invocation and in the name of the Great Architect of the Universe. All the summonses of the Order and of the Lodges will be printed with the symbols of the Great Architect of the Universe.
4. No religious or political discussion will be permitted in the Lodge.
5. The Lodge as such will never take part officially in any political affair but every individual Brother will preserve complete liberty of opinion and action.
6. Only those Brethren who are recognised as true Brethren by the Grand Lodge of England will be received in Lodge.

These appear to have formed the basis for the 1929 Basic Principles for Grand Lodge Recognition, still used by the United Grand Lodge of England.

==== Great Architect of the Universe ====
In 1813, upon the union of Antients and Moderns, the UGLE had created a new Constitution, based on the Constitutions of Anderson of the Moderns and the Ahiman Rezon of the Antients, which required acceptance of the Great Architect of the Universe.

The Grand Orient de France (GOdF) initially adapted its Constitution in order to comply. In 1877, however, on a proposal of the Protestant priest Frédéric Desmons at the convention of the GOdF, the members of the convention removed references to the Great Architect of the Universe (GAOTU) from their Constitution. They saw their decision as a way to return to the original Constitution of James Anderson of 1723. The first two sentences of the constitution of the GOdF (in English translation) had been:

"Its principles of Freemasonry are the existence of God, the immortality of the soul, and human solidarity. It considers liberty of conscience as an inherent right of each man and excludes no one because of his beliefs."

These became:

"Its principles are liberty of conscience and human solidarity. It excludes no one because of his beliefs."

This decision led to a schism between the Grand Orient de France and the United Grand Lodge of England (UGLE). Since the great schism of 1877 freemasonry is divided in two branches, Continental style Freemasonry and Anglo Freemasonry. These two branches are not in mutual regular amity, since most English style lodges consider Continental style lodges to be irregular, although until World War I eight English style Grand Lodges still recognized the Grand Orient of France. The Grand Orient de France (Grand Orients) and the United Grand Lodge of England (Grand Lodges) are the basic models for each variety of freemasonry.

=== Present ===
==== Home Grand Lodges – related jurisdictions ====
A large collection of mutually recognised Grand Lodges derives its regularity from one or more of the Home Grand Lodges (United Grand Lodge of England (UGLE), Grand Lodge of Scotland (GLoS) and Grand Lodge of Ireland (GLoI)) based on criteria known as "Basic Principles for Grand Lodge Recognition" which together they codified and published on 4 September 1929 (although not new – they had been developed and refined over at least the preceding 150 years):

1. Regularity of origin; i.e.each Grand Lodge shall have been established lawfully by a duly recognised Grand Lodge or by three or more regularly constituted Lodges.
2. That a belief in the G.A.O.T.U. and His revealed will shall be an essential qualification for membership.
3. That all Initiates shall take their Obligation on or in full view of an open Volume of Sacred Law, by which is meant the revelation from above which is binding on the conscience of the particular individual who is being initiated.
4. That the membership of the Grand Lodge and individual Lodges shall be composed exclusively of men; and that each Grand Lodge shall have no Masonic intercourse of any kind with mixed Lodges or bodies which admit women to membership.
5. That the Grand Lodge shall have sovereign jurisdiction over Lodges under its control; i.e. that it shall be a responsible, independent, self-governing organisation, with sole and undisputed authority over the Craft or Symbolic Degrees (Entered Apprentice, Fellow Craft, and Master Mason) within its Jurisdiction; and shall not in any way be subject to, or divide such authority with, a Supreme Council or other Power claiming any control or supervision over those degrees.
6. That the three Great Lights of Freemasonry (namely, a Volume of Sacred Law, the Square, and the Compasses) shall always be exhibited when the Grand Lodge or its subordinate Lodges are at work, the chief of these being the Volume of Sacred Law.
7. That the discussion of religion and politics within the Lodge shall be strictly prohibited.
8. That the principles of the Antient Landmarks, customs, and usages of the Craft be strictly observed.

The first attempt to codify the governance of Freemasonry was The Constitution of the Freemasons of Strasbourg in 1459, which the Masonic Bodies of Continental Freemasonry hold as the essence of Freemasonry. However, the more popular codification in English - speaking nations was created by James Anderson in his Constitutions, published in 1723, which contain his idea of the basic principles. Dr. Albert Mackey built on this in 1856, when he identified 25 Landmarks or characteristics of Masonry which have been widely adopted in America.

UGLE considers itself to be the most ancient Grand Lodge in continuous existence. Although it was founded in 1813 with its first Grand Master, it considers itself a continuation of the much older Grand Lodge of London, founded in 1717 by four pre-existent lodges. No record exists of any earlier Lodge organisation styling itself as a Grand Lodge. Three of the four original lodges still exist. Today they are UGLE lodges No 2, No 4, and No 12. Naturally, since they were founded even before the creation of the Grand Lodge of London, they function without the normal warrant, and also have some internal offices and regulations which differ from the standard UGLE constitutions. As they pre-date the foundation of the oldest grand lodge, and as their actual date of foundation is unknown, these three lodges are referred to as being "time immemorial" lodges. Since 1717 other grand lodges have been founded, and many have sought recognition by UGLE, hence it has claimed the 'benchmark' of masonic regularity.

==== Liberal style jurisdictions ====
The Liberal style Grand Lodges and Grand Orients have created several organizations in order to organize their international relations, such as CLIPSAS, the International Masonic Union Catena, CIMAS, COMAM, TRACIA and, formerly, the International Secretariat of the Masonic Adogmatic Powers before it was re-absorbed into CLIPSAS.

Other bodies predicate their assessment of regularity on the 8th decree of Anderson's Constitution; a Lodge is regular if it works in conformity to the rules of its granted constitutional patent. Grand Lodges certify regularity to their recognized Member Lodges and Grand Lodges with patents.

== Europe ==
=== Austria ===
The first Grand Lodge in Austria, the Große Landesloge von Österreich was founded in Vienna in 1784 but only ten years later in 1794 Freemasonry was forbidden by the then Holy Roman Emperor Franz II. After the Austro-Hungarian Compromise of 1867 Freemasonry was re-established, but only in the Hungarian part of the Empire. After the end of World War I, only four weeks after the proclamation of the Republic of German-Austria the Grand Lodge of Vienna was founded on 8 December 1918. She was recognised by UGLE in 1930. Immediately after the annexation of Austria into Nazi Germany in 1938 Freemasonry was again forbidden. After the end of World War II the Grand Lodge of Vienna was formally re-established on 4 August 1945. In 1952 UGLE restored relations with her. 1955 after the end of the Allied occupation of Austria the Grandlodge changed its name into Grand Lodge of Austria.

The Grand Lodge of Austria has currently 77 lodges with approx. 3500 brethren.

=== Belgium ===
Several Grand Lodges are active in Belgium.

The Regular Grand Lodge of Belgium (R.G.L.B.) is currently the only Belgian Grand Lodge which is recognised as regular by UGLE and its concordant jurisdictions.

The oldest Grand Lodge of Belgium, the Grand Orient of Belgium (G.O.B.) lost its recognition by the UGLE in the 19th century when it decided to remove the requirement for Masons to have a belief in a Supreme Being. In an attempt to regain recognition by the UGLE, five lodges from the GOB founded the Grand Lodge of Belgium (G.L.B.) in 1959. When in 1979 the G.L.B. also lost its recognition by UGLE, nine lodges founded the Regular Grand Lodge of Belgium on 15 June 1979.

=== Bulgaria ===
The oldest obedience in Bulgaria is the Most Worshipful Grand Lodge of Bulgaria, established in 1917. Until it was banned in 1940 by a Nazi Law called "Law of the Homeland protection" this Grand Lodge was recognized by 47 regular and mainstream Grand Lodges worldwide. Most of the recognitions were never withdrawn and after Grand Lodge of Bulgaria (GLB) was reactivated it gained additional recognitions. Today GLB is recognized by 54 Grand Lodges from Europe, North and South America and Africa. It works in the Antient & Accepted Scottish Rite, has 16 Constituent lodges including one English speaking Lodge "HIRAM".

=== Ireland ===
Regular Freemasonry in the Republic of Ireland and Northern Ireland is controlled by the Grand Lodge of Ireland, which is based in Dublin. It has jurisdiction over 13 Provincial Grand Lodges covering all the Freemasons of the island of Ireland, and another 12 provinces worldwide.

=== France ===
In 2021 they were 38 Grand Lodges operating in France including overseas territories. They range from 200 to 60,000 members.

The Grande Loge Nationale Française (GLNF) is the only French Grand Lodge to be recognised as regular by UGLE and its concordant jurisdictions.

The Grand Orient de France (GOdF) was recognised by most Grand Lodges in the world until the middle of the 19th century, when the GOdF recognized the Supreme Council of Louisiana. This caused several US Grand Lodges to withdraw recognition from the GOdF. The final breaking point, however, came about due to a decision by the GOdF in 1877 to remove the requirement for Masons to have a belief in a Supreme Being. UGLE and most other Grand Lodges in the Anglo-American tradition suspended all relations with, and recognition of, the Grand Orient de France as a result.

=== Germany ===
The Vereinigte Großlogen von Deutschland or United Grand Lodges of Germany (VGLvD) is the regular Grand Lodge in Germany, it comprises five united Grand Lodges of varying traditions: two traditional German Grand Lodges, one Prussian Swedish Rite Grand Lodge, one English tradition Grand Lodge and one North American tradition Grand Lodge, the latter two Grand Lodges having been formed by occupying forces.

There are also Masonic Grand Lodges in Germany including Women Freemasons (FGLD) as well as Co-Freemasons.

=== Greece ===
Freemasonry in Greece is represented by two Grand Lodges that claim regularity: the Grand Lodge of Greece and the National Grand Lodge of Greece.

The Grand Lodge of Greece, established in 1867 and renamed after World War II, is recognized by the United Grand Lodge of England (UGLE) and maintains relations with most internationally recognized Masonic bodies. It is not currently recognized by the Grand Lodges of Scotland and Ireland.

The National Grand Lodge of Greece was founded in 1986 following disputes over the York Rite and issues of governance. Initially composed of York Rite members, it later adopted British ritual practices and gained recognition from several foreign Masonic authorities, including the Grand Lodges of Scotland and Ireland. . However, it is not recognized by UGLE and does not have the same breadth of international recognition as the Grand Lodge of Greece. The Grand Lodge of Greece considers the establishment of the National Grand Lodge to be irregular, asserting that it violated Masonic tradition by forming within territory already served by an existing, legally constituted Grand Lodge.

In the 1990s, UGLE temporarily withdrew recognition from the Grand Lodge of Greece, citing political involvement and excessive dependence on appendant bodies. Recognition was restored in 2000, and the Grand Lodge of Greece remains recognized as regular within the Anglo-American Masonic tradition.

Efforts toward reconciliation have continued over the years. In 2024, the National Grand Lodge proposed mutual recognition, shared jurisdiction, or the formation of a united Grand Lodge that would preserve both groups' autonomy and heritage. The Grand Lodge of Greece rejected these proposals, maintaining that reunification could only occur through absorption. Although no agreement was reached, the discussion ended on amicable terms, and the National Grand Lodge has expressed continued interest in dialogue.

The coexistence of two Grand Lodges in Greece continues, each asserting regularity and maintaining international relationships. While discussions on unification have so far been inconclusive, dialogue between the two sides remains open. In addition to these two bodies, other Masonic groups also operate in Greece, though they are not widely recognized by internationally established Grand Lodges.

=== Italy ===
There are no fewer than three national Grand Lodges operating in Italy.

The Grand Regular Italian Lodge and the Grand Orient of Italy are regular obediences recognized by United Grand Lodge of England.

=== Portugal ===
In Portugal the Grand Lodge is called Grande Loja Legal de Portugal (GLLP/GLRP).

The Grand Lodge of Portugal (GLLP / GLRP) is a regular Portuguese Masonic obedience. GLLP and the Regular Grand Lodge of Portugal vied for the leadership of regular Portuguese Masonry until their reconciliation in 2011, the second was officially recognized by the United Grand Lodge of England (UGLE).

=== Slovakia ===
In Slovakia is a Grand Lodge that called Veľká lóža Slovenska (Great Lodge of Slovakia) .

=== United Kingdom ===
Masonic activity in the United Kingdom is governed by three bodies which are independent from each other. The United Grand Lodge of England has jurisdiction over Freemasonry in England, Wales, the Channel Islands, and the Isle of Man ("English Constitution" – "EC"), the Grand Lodge of Scotland over Freemasonry in Scotland ("Scottish Constitution" – "SC"), and the Grand Lodge of Ireland over Freemasonry in Ireland ("Irish Constitution" – "IC").

Because of the historical role of the United Grand Lodge of England (UGLE) in the development of Freemasonry, the term "Regular Freemasonry", when it is not further defined, usually refers to the United Grand Lodge of England and its recognized jurisdictions. Since UGLE is considered to be not only the oldest, but also the largest grouping of lodges, UGLE recognition (or the lack thereof) is generally the barometer by which a Masonic jurisdiction is deemed regular. UGLE provides a list of recognised Grand Lodges on its website.

== North America ==
=== Canada ===
The majority of Canadian Grand Lodges are in amity with UGLE. There is also a presence of GOdF-affiliated Grand Lodges and Orients that follow Continental Freemasonry, particularly in the French-speaking province of Quebec.

=== United States ===
In the United States, each state has a Grand Lodge that supervises the lodges within that state and is sovereign and independent within that jurisdiction. These are commonly referred to as the "regular" or "mainstream" Grand Lodges. There is no national Grand Lodge. All regular Grand Lodges in the US are in mutual amity with each other and with UGLE.

Because of historical segregation, many states also have a sovereign and independent Prince Hall Grand Lodge that is predominantly African-American. For many years the mainstream Grand Lodges did not recognize Prince Hall Freemasonry and considered their Prince Hall Freemasonry irregular. By 1990, four mainstream Grand Lodges had recognized Prince Hall Grand Lodges as Freemasons.

Due to a 19th-century argument and a resulting schism, not all Prince Hall Grand Lodges recognize each other (see Prince Hall National Grand Lodge), and generally the mainstream Grand Lodges have followed the lead of their Prince Hall counterparts when it comes to recognizing Prince Hall Grand Lodges in other states.

Throughout the US there are also some independent Masonic Lodges and Grand Lodges, which are not recognized as such by UGLE, the mainstream Grand Lodges, or their Prince Hall counterparts. Many of these are affiliated with international organizations of Continental Freemasonry.

=== Mexico ===
Among the numerous Masonic bodies in the country, two notable exception stands out: The York Grand Lodge of Mexico. Established in 1910, it holds the distinction of being the sole Grand Lodge (practicing York Rite) with federal character in Mexico. and Grand Lodge of Valle de Mexico (practicing Scottish Rite) established in 1862. Since inception, each Grand Lodge has maintained recognition from the United Grand Lodge of England, recognitions that persist to the present day.

== South America ==
=== Chile ===
The Only regular regular Masonic body in Chile is the Grand Lodge of Chile, founded on May 24, 1862 in Valparaíso. The earthquake of 1906 destroyed the original headquarters and the archives of the Grand Lodge, which determined its definitive transfer to Santiago, settling in the Club de la República, located in 659 Marcoleta street.

In 1862, the Grand Lodge of Chile was recognized by the Grand Lodge of Massachusetts, that is, the same year it was founded, and the following year it would obtain recognition from the Grand Lodge of the District of Columbia.

In 1864, when the problems caused by Napoleon III in French Freemasonry had already been overcome, official recognition was obtained by the Central Grand Orient de France. By 1862, the first Constitution was promulgated under the name of Statutes of the Masonic Order in Chile.

The Grand Lodge of Chile has jurisdiction over the symbolic lodges (they work in the degrees of apprentice, fellow craft and Master Mason), these can work three different rites: Ancient and Accepted Scottish Rite, York Rite and Schröder Rite. His currently Grand Master is W. Bro. Sebastián Jans, since 2018.

Chile has a Supreme Council of the Scottish Rite, with jurisdiction over 4 to 33 degree too, was foundes on 1870 and reactivated on 1899, with Eduardo de la Barra as his first Sovereign Grand Commander

Notwithstanding the foregoing, there are several regular Lodges that depend on other regular Masonic bodies, such as Harmony Lodge 1411 (based in Valparaiso, dependent on the District Grand Lodge of South America, southern division of the United Grand Lodge of England), Britannia Lodge 1033 (located in Santiago, Grand Lodge of Scotland) Bethesda and Huelen Lodges (dependent on American Freemasonry)

== See also ==
- Anglo-American Freemasonry
- Adonhiramite Rite
- Liberal Freemasonry
- List of Masonic rites
- Philosophical Scottish Rite
- Rectified Scottish Rite
- Scottish Rite
- York Rite
