= Grand Landlodge of the Freemasons of Germany =

Masonic Grand Lodge in Germany

The Grand Landlodge of the Freemasons of Germany (Große Landesloge der Freimaurer von Deutschland, GLL FvD or GLL), also: Order of Freemasons (Freimaurerorden, FO) is a Masonic Grand Lodge in Germany. It is one of the founding members of the United Grand Lodges of Germany and as such it is one of the five German Grand Lodges recognized as belonging to "Regular Freemasonry" by the United Grand Lodge of England (UGLE). The Grand Lodge was established in 1770 by Johann Wilhelm Kellner von Zinnendorf, a Prussian Army physician. It is one of three so called Old Prussian Grand Lodges.

The red cross pattée of the above form is a commonly used symbol for Freemasonry practising the Swedish Rite

The Grand Landlodge of the Freemasons of Germany works according to a slightly modified version of the Swedish Rite. It therefore differs from other German Grand Lodges both in its content and organizational structure. However, as a masonic Grand Lodge it is not a religious community and affiliation to a particular Christian denomination is not required. Neither is it necessary for a member of the Order to be expressly Christian, however the Rules of the Order demand that every member "recognize the teachings of Jesus Christ as they are written down in the Holy Scripture".

The Order of Freemasons demands that its members keep working continuously at the development of their own personality. Rationality and conscience, inner freedom and self-knowledge as well as being conscious of one's responsibilities are regarded as the necessary means by which one can approach the finding of the origin, character and destiny of mankind and the whole of existence.

== Organizational structure ==
regalia used under the Grand Landlodge of the Freemasons of Germany: trowel and Master Mason's key

The Grand Landlodge of the Freemasons of Germany is divided into three branches:

- St. John's Lodge (i.e. Blue Lodge, or Craft Lodge) working the regular three masonic degrees,
- St. Andrew's Lodge working the IVth to VIth degree
- The Chapter working the VIIth to Xth degree

- apart from this, there is also a High Chapter for the holders of the XIth degree of Knight Commander with some 70 members. The conjunction of these branches forms a cohesive masonic body that closely follows that of the Swedish Rite, which is predominantly found in Scandinavian countries.

Institutions of the Order of Freemasons include:

- the Research Lodge Frederik based in Flensburg/Husum and founded in 1982,
- the Freemasonry Museum in St. Michaelisdonn,
- the Zinnendorf Foundation in Hamburg-Eppendorf, founded in 1991,
- the Zirkelkorrespondenz, the Order's member's journal, founded in 1872,
- the organization St. John's Fraternal Help for Self Help (St. Johannis Bruderhilfe zur Selbsthilfe), founded in 1998 and organizes social relief projects in Eastern Europe.

The new headquarters of the Order are situated in Berlin-Dahlem, the former headquarters having been destroyed in World War II. The Order is headed by a dual leadership consisting of the Master of the Order(Ordensmeister) and the Grand Master of the Land(Landesgroßmeister). The Grand Master of the Land is the administrative head of the Great Landlodge. He is elected by the main assembly and is comparable to the Grand Masters of other Grand Lodges. He heads the St. John's and St. Andrew's Lodges. The Master of the Order is the elected head of the Order in its entirety. He heads the Chapter and safeguards the teachings and traditions of the Grand Landlodge. The Grand Master of the Land is aided by a council of Grand Officers, the Master of the Order is aided by the Council of the Order. The most prominent Master of the Order was the future (1888) German Emperor Frederick III. At present, there are ten Provincial Lodges that administrate the activities of the St. John's and St. Andrew's Lodges of a certain district.

The GLLFvD's St. John's lodges are comparable to the blue lodges of other Grand Lodges and work the same degrees. The St. Andrew's Lodges and Chapters are comparable to Appendant Bodies. At present, the Grand Landlodge claims to have 3,500 members. In the year 1934 the number was said to have been near to 20,000 members in 178 lodges, predominantly in Prussia. In the area of the former German Democratic Republic 18 St. John's and 2 St. Andrew's lodges have been reactivated. In 2007 the Grand Landlodge included 109 St. John's lodges, 26 St. Andrew's lodges, 10 Provincial lodges and 11 Chapters. The Grand Landlodge is strongest in the German States of Hamburg, Lower Saxony and Berlin. In the course of the last years individual lodges have been established in Lome/Togo, Riga/Latvia and Monaco, of which only the first one in Lome is still a member of the Grand Landlodge.

The Provincial Lodges are intermediaries between the St. John's and St. Andrew's lodges and the Grand Master of the Land. They administer the Lodges of their particular area, to simplify the work of the Grand Master. With the exception of the Provincial Lodge of Lower Saxony, all Provincial Lodges in existence today, have been founded in the course of the 20th century. The borders of today's Provincial Lodges are approximately equal to today's state borders.

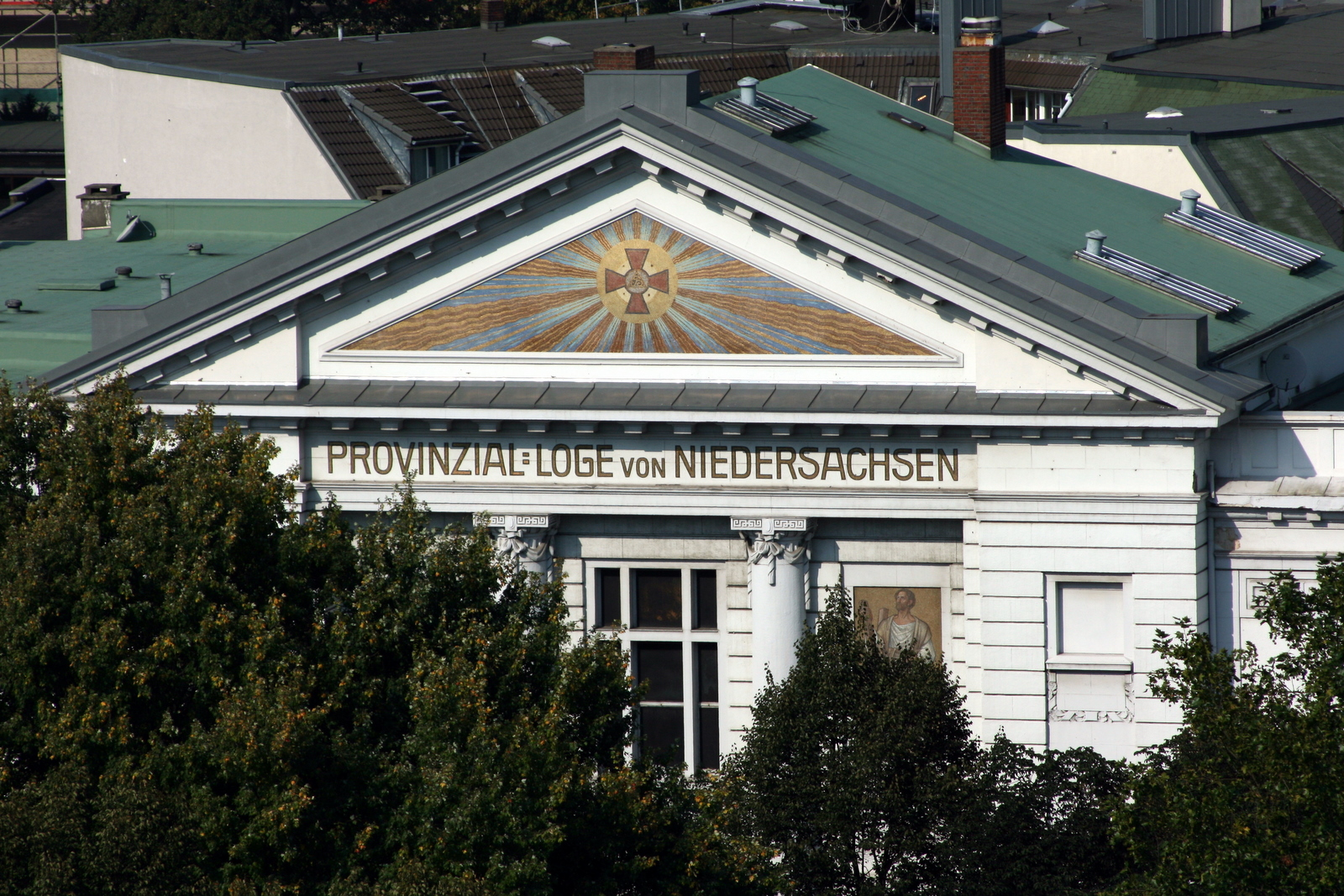
Provincial Lodge of Lower Saxony in Hamburg, Lodge House

The 10 modern day Grand Lodges:

- Provincial Lodge of Lower Saxony in Hamburg, founded in 1777
- Provincial Lodge Mecklenburg in Rostock, founded in 1995
- Provincial Lodge Bavaria in Munich, founded in 1925
- Provincial Lodge Hesse in Frankfurt, founded in 1948
- Provincial Lodge Schleswig-Holstein in Kiel, founded in 1951
- Provincial Lodge Northrhine-Westphalia in Hagen, founded in 1952
- Provincial Lodge Baden-Württemberg in Stuttgart, founded in 1955
- Provincial Lodge Bremen-Oldenburg in Bremen, founded in 1989
- Provincial Lodge Saxony-Thuringia in Leipzig, founded in 2004
- Provincial Lodge Berlin-Brandenburg in Berlin, founded in 2005

Apart from the still existing first Provincial Lodge of Lower Saxony, the historic Provincial Lodges included the Provincial Lodge of Silesia (1779–1935), Pommerania (1777–1812) and Austria (1776–1783). Following these was the establishment of a Provincial Lodge of Russia in St. Petersburg (1777–1785) and a Provincial Lodge of Westphalia in 1808. These Provincial Lodges are no longer in existence.

== History ==
=== Early history ===
During the 18th century, some 70% of German Masonic Lodges worked according to the rituals of the Strict Observance. In the 1760s resentment was growing against the rituals of that Order, which were regarded as lacking in content and overly pompous, as well as the Strict Observance's "economical plan". As one of those, who were unsatisfied with this Rite, Johann Wilhelm Kellner von Zinnendorf wrote to the Grand Lodge in London, asking for a patent to establish a new Lodge. However the London Grand Lodge declined, as there were already a great number of Masonic Lodges and Grand Lodges in existence in Berlin at that time.

After that, Kellner von Zinnendorf tried, through the help of a friend of his, to gain a patent and rituals from Karl Friedrich Eckleff in Sweden. This attempt also failed, but other friends of his continued with these attempts. At this point, he was still acting in accordance with the Army Master (Heermeister) of the Strict Observance, who was informed of his actions.

Only a friend of Kellner von Zinnendorf's called Baumann finally managed to gain Eckleff's trust. On 14 September 1766 he returned to Berlin carrying a personal letter from Eckleff to Kellner von Zinnendorf, containing the ritual files, a charter permitting the establishment of Lodges abiding by the Swedish Rite, instructions for the Master of the Order and directions for the establishment of a Chapter. Shortly thereafter, a quarrel began between Kellner von Zinnendorf and the Army Master of the Strict Observance, von Hund. On 16 December 1766, Kellner von Zinnendorf left the Strict Observance and spent his time concentrating on the establishment of a new Grand Lodge.

During this time, Baumann's files were translated into German and several Lodges, working according to the new ritual, were founded in the Berlin area. Kellner von Zinnendorf's goal was to create at least 12 Lodges, in order to found his new Grand Lodge. However, on 27 December 1770 it was decided to go ahead with the establishment of the Grand Landlodge of the Freemasons of Germany, even though only 7 St. John's Lodges and one St. Andrew's Lodge had so far been founded.

Following the establishment, Kellner von Zinnendorf was anxious to get on good terms with the Grand Lodge in London. On 30 November 1773 an official letter of recognition arrived from London, to the effect that the Grand Landlodge was recognized as the sole Grand Lodge of the German states and was thus regarded as an equal by the Grand Lodge in London.

On 14 October 1773 a meeting was arranged between representatives of the Grand Landlodge and of the Strict Observance. There an unsteady agreement was achieved, ending long lasting conflict between the two rites that had been raging since Kellner von Zinnendorf left the Strict Observance in 1766.

Another milestone in the history of the Grand Landlodge was Frederick the Great's Letter of Protection of 16 July 1774, which guaranteed the Grand Landlodge his royal protection.

In Sweden Duke Charles of Södermanland had taken over the office of Master of the Order from Eckleff in 1773. As he was additionally offered the office of Army Master of the Strict Observance and he accepted, relations between the Grand Lodge of Sweden and the Grand Landlodge deteriorated.

Around the year 1778 the Grand Landlodge consisted of 34 Lodges. After the death of its founder Kellner von Zinnendorf, in the year 1782 it consisted of a total of 62 Lodges. Provincial Lodges were created in Austria, Silesia, Pomerania, Lower Saxony and Russia.

=== 19th century ===
The history of the Grand Landlodge in the course of the 19th century includes several high points. Following the death of King Carl XIII of Sweden on 5 February 1818 there was a reconciliation with the Grand Lodge of Sweden, which amounted to a Treaty of Friendship that was signed on 13 April 1819. Using the new rituals that were sent from Sweden, Christian Karl Friedrich Wilhelm von Nettelbladt implemented a significant reform of the rituals.

In 1872 Adolf Widmann founded the Zirkelkorrespondenz, a masonic magazine, which is still published today and distributed among the members of the Grand Landlodge. Widmann traveled to Sweden in 1869 and worked on a further compilation of the rituals.

The two most prominent members of the Grand Landlodge during the 19th century were the German Emperors William I and Frederick III; the latter was also Master of the Order of the Grand Landlodge.

=== 20th century ===
Following a meeting between Hermann Göring and Grand Master of the Land von Heeringen on 7 April 1933 the GLL officially rejected its masonic foundation and especially eliminated all parts of the ritual drawing on the Old Testament and got rid of all masonic nomenclature. It now bore the name of "German-Christian Order of the Knights Templar".

On 10 April 1933 von Heeringen informed the other two Old Prussian Lodges of this conversion. In the days that followed, the other Old Prussian Lodges followed its example.

Internally everything that was considered typical of Freemasonry was either changed or eliminated. The aprons were abolished, Solomon's Temple was changed to the "German Cathedral" or Strasbourg Cathedral, all parts of the ritual referring to or drawing from the Old Testament were done away with and the legend of Hiram Abiff replaced by the ancient Germanic legend of Baldr. However, none of these conversions were ever accepted by the Nazi Party.

Thus the leaders of the national Grand Lodges demonstrated a grave misjudgement of Freemasonry's role in the National Socialist view of the world. Years of Nazi propaganda had stylized Freemasonry to a form of abstract hate symbol similar to the Jews. Therefore, they were generally regarded as enemies.

The Grand Landlodge tried in vain to take legal action against the increasing riots against the Lodges that had increased dramatically since the Nazi seizure of power in 1933. Of course the legal proceedings against local leaders of the Sturmabteilung and the Nazi Party were unsuccessful.

When all legal actions failed, no further noteworthy resistance was offered by the GLL. Its officials are said to have asked for the intervention of the Swedish King Gustav V, which was obviously unsuccessful as well. However, they managed to smuggle essential parts of their archive to Sweden, through dubious connections. These documents were returned in 1978.

In the spring of 1935, the Grand Lodge of Prussia, called "Zur Freundschaft", tried to find a solution for the situation. Their most prominent member, the Reich Minister Hjalmar Schacht was sent to talk to Hitler and found out that a dissolution of German Freemasonry was inevitable. The Interior Ministry ordered that all Grand Lodges along with their constituent lodges had to be disbanded by 21 July 1935. On 14 July 1935 a final ceremony was held by the Grand Landlodge.

Immediately following World War II preparations were made for the reestablishment of the Grand Landlodge. Dr. Hans Oehmen was elected the first Master of the Order of the post-war period. Paul Rosenthal became the Grand Lodge's first Grand Master of the Land, however he died as early as 1946. The negotiations that finally led to the establishment of the United Grand Lodges of Germany – Brotherhood of Freemasons, were led by the 19th Master of the Order Dr. Fritz Pauk.

== Leaders ==
=== Masters of the Order ===
- Johann Wilhelm Kellner von Zinnendorf (1770–1782),
- Levin von Geusau (1782–1808),
- Frederick Salvemini de Castillon (1808–1814),
- Burchard Ludwig Werner Cramer (1814–1815),
- Gottfried Ernst Andreas Müller (1815),
- Joachim Friedrich Neander von Petersheiden (1815–1817),
- Christian Friedrich Becherer (1817–1821),
- Johann Michael Palmié (1821–1841),
- Wilhelm Ludwig Viktor Graf Henckel von Donnersmarck (1841–1849),
- Karl Friedrich von Selasinsky (1849–1860),
- Prinz Friedrich Wilhelm Nikolaus Karl von Preußen (1860–1874),
- Caesar Carl Ludwig von Dachroeden (1874–1877),
- Gustav Adolf von Ziegler (1877–1882),
- Alexis Bravmann Schmidt (1882–1895),
- Prinz Friedrich Leopold von Preußen (1895–1918),
- Wilhelm Augustin Balthasar-Wolfradt (1919–1934),
- Friedrich Bolle (1934–1946),
- Hans Oehmen (1946–1949),
- Fritz Pauk (1949–1968),
- Reinhold Mueller (1968–1972),
- Robinson Schellack (1972–1979),
- Hartwig Lohmann (1979–1997),
- Manfred Obermann (1998–2005),
- Joachim Klauss (2005–2016),
- Joachim Strassner (2016–2019)
- Uwe Matthes (2020- )

=== Grand Masters of the Land ===
- Martin Kröncke (1770–1773),
- Prinz Ludwig Georg Karl von Hessen-Darmstadt (1773–1774),
- Johann Wilhelm Kellner von Zinnendorf (1774),
- Herzog Ernst II. zu Sachsen-Gotha und Altenburg,
- Karl Alexander Freiherr von der Goltz (1776),
- Jacob Mumssen (1777–1780),
- Johann Wilhelm Kellner von Zinnendorf (1780–1782),
- Frederick Salvemini de Castillon (1782–1789),
- Karl August von Beulwitz (1789–1799),
- Frederick Salvemini de Castillon (1799–1814),
- Joachim Friedrich Neander von Petersheiden (1814–1818),
- Johann Heinrich Otto von Schmidt (1818–1837),
- Johann Michael Palmié (1837–1838),
- Wilhelm Ludwig Viktor Graf Henckel von Donnersmarck (1838–1841),
- Karl Friedrich von Selasinsky (1841–1842),
- Wilhelm Ludwig Viktor Graf Henckel von Donnersmarck (1842–1843),
- Dietrich Wilhelm Heinrich Busch (1843–1858),
- Christoph Klemm (1858–1864),
- Caesar Carl Ludwig von Dachroeden (1864–1872),
- Gustav Adolf von Ziegler (1872–1882),
- Fedor Rudolph Alexander Neuland (1883–1891),
- Hermann Zoellner (1891–1900),
- Eugen von Kuycke (1900–1903),
- Karl Gartz (1903–1908),
- Stanislaus Graf Dohna (1908–1916),
- Eugen Müllendorff (1916–1931),
- Kurt von Heeringen (1931–1935),
- Paul Rosenthal (1945),
- Hans Oehmen (1946–1948),
- Paul Hoffmann (1948–1957),
- Willy Coßmann (1957–1963),
- Eugen Fritz (1963–1973),
- Georg C. Frommholz (1973–1981),
- Manfred Obermann (1981–1990),
- Hanns-Jürgen Funk (1990–1995),
- Wolfgang Demmer (1995–1998),
- Wolfgang Dahme (1998–2004),
- Bodo Raschke (2004–2007),
- Joachim Strassner (2007–2016)
- Günter J. Stolz (2016–2018)
- Uwe Matthes (2019–2020)
- Horst Reimann (2021-)

== Notable members ==
- Johann Erich Biester, * 1749, † 1816
- Gebhard Leberecht von Blücher, * 1742, † 1819
- Holger Börner honorary member, * 1931, † 2006
- Albert Emil Brachvogel, * 1824, † 1878
- Julius Campe, * 1792, † 1867
- Matthias Claudius, * 1740, † 1815
- Johann Heinrich Bernhard Dräseke, * 1774, † 1849
- Hans Conrad Dietrich Ekhof, * 1720, † 1778
- Ernest II of Saxe-Gotha-Altenburg, * 1745, † 1804
- Emperor Frederick III, * 1831, † 1888
- Gottlieb Wilhelm Freudentheil, * 1792, † 1869
- Caspar David Friedrich, * 1774, † 1840
- Wilhelm Ludwig Viktor Henckel von Donnersmarck, * 1775, † 1849
- Friedrich Gottlieb Klopstock, * 1724, † 1803
- Freiherr Adolph Knigge, * 1752, † 1796
- Gotthold Ephraim Lessing, * 1729, † 1781
- Karl Bernhard Ritter, * 1890, † 1968
- Gerhard von Scharnhorst, * 1755, † 1813
- Emperor William I, * 1797, † 1888

== Headquarters of the Order ==
For some years following its foundation, the Grand Landlodge's administration was housed in the private homes of some of its members. In 1786 a property in Berlin was acquired for its use by Christoph Friedrich Nicolai. On these grounds the first "House of the Order" was built and turned over to the Grand Landlodge in 1791. Initially this house remained private property, but between 1806 and 1816 it housed the French General Staff. See also: →History of Berlin

In 1821 the building passed into the ownership of the Grand Landlodge. In 1839 the "House of the Order" was extended and was ornamented with a Classicist facade. As the number of members in the city of Berlin increased to more than 1200, the building had to be extended once more, in 1845. In 1898 it was sold to the Post Office as another extension would not have been possible. Until the completion of the new "House of the Order", the lodges of the Grand Landlodge made use of the facilities of the other two Old Prussian Lodges.

The Foundation Stone Ceremony for the second "House of the Order" took place on 11 November 1898 and the dedication of the building took place on 18 November 1900. It was the largest "House of the Order" of the Grand Landlodge to date. The building's 15,000 m^{2} housed 8 temples, 2 great banquet halls, 2 assembly halls, 3 conference rooms, 6 residential flats, an archive, a museum's hall and several administrative offices.

The "House of the Order" was lost through the compulsory expropriation by the National Socialist Government in 1935. During World War II it was heavily damaged by bombings and looting. In December 1945 the building's basement was once again used for meetings, but the house could not be rebuilt. Therefore, the property was sold in 1965.

The money gained from selling the old property, together with donations from the Landlodge's members, served to buy the new, albeit smaller, "House of the Order".

== Bibliography ==
- Helmut Neuberger: Winkelmaß und Hakenkreuz. Herbig Verlag, München 2001, ISBN 3-7766-2222-9.
- Ferdinand Runkel: Geschichte der Freimaurerei. Edition Lempertz, Bonn 2006, ISBN 3-933070-96-1.
- GLLFvD (Hrsg.): Handbuch der GLLFvD 2007, Verlag Rudolf Stade.
- Jürgen Holtorf: Die Logen der Freimaurer. Nikol Verlag, Hamburg 1997, ISBN 3-930656-58-2.
- Eugen Lennhoff, Oskar Posner, Dieter A. Binder: Internationales Freimaurerlexikon. Überarbeitete und erweiterte Neuauflage der Ausgabe von 1932, München 2003, ISBN 3-7766-2161-3
