= Grand National Mother Lodge, "The Three Globes" =

Coordinates: 52.5091°N 13.2623°E

The Grand National Mother Lodge "The Three Globes"
- Established: 13 September 1740
- Location: Germany
- Region served: Germany
- Grand Master: Bernd Engel
- Website: Große National-Mutterloge„Zu den drei Weltkugeln”

The Grand National Mother Lodge "The Three Globes" (Große National-Mutterloge „Zu den drei Weltkugeln“) is the oldest recognized Masonic Grand Lodge in Germany, being found in Berlin in 1740. In 1933, being one of eight national Grand Lodges, it had 22,700 members in 177 lodges. In 1935 freemasonry in Nazi Germany was suppressed. The Mother Lodge "The Three Globes" was reactivated in 1946 and is currently a member of the umbrella organization United Grand Lodges of Germany.

== History ==
On the night of 14/15 August 1738, the future Frederick the Great, then Crown Prince, was initiated as a Freemason in Brunswick, being quickly passed to fellowcraft and raised to Master, all without the knowledge of his father. He invited Baron von Oberg and the writer Jakob Friedrich von Bielfeld, who were instrumental to his candidature, to form La loge première/La loge du Roi notre grand maître at Rheinsberg Castle, with Oberg as Master. After his accession to the Crown he led the lodge himself from 20 June 1740. The foundation of the Grand Lodge is taken as 13 September 1740, when, with the King's permission, the lodge Aux Trois Globes was formed under the auspices of the privy council and Charles-Étienne Jordan. It was modelled on the Premier Grand Lodge of England, although it received no charter from it.

When the King departed in the same year for the first Silesian War, La loge première was dissolved and its members joined the new lodge. This new lodge created according to the custom of their time in the coming years lodges in Meiningen, Frankfurt an der Oder, Wrocław, Dresden and Neuchâtel. On 24 June 1744 they therefore took the name Great Royal Mother Lodge of the Three Globes, and finally changed this on 5 July 1772 to Grand National Mother Lodge of the Prussian-States.

On 5 March 1767 the Mother Lodge "The Three Globes" became submerged in the Rite of Strict Observance as L'union, but withdrew in 1778. After the Williamsbad Congress of 1782/3, which ended Strict Observance, they declared independence and adopted the "Rectified System".

To escape the Masonic hostility of the Third Reich, they turned to the "National Christian Order Frederick the Great" to, but this had no effect, because in 1935 they had to dissolve.

After the Second World War, the Great National Mother Lodge was reactivated in 1946, but their effect area was initially limited to the American Sector in Berlin. A total of 42 lodges of GNML "3WK" joined the United Grand Lodge, founded in 1949, only five lodges in the Federal Republic remained faithful to their Grand Lodge, waiting for the local approval.

The United Grand Lodges of Germany - Brotherhood of Freemasons was founded in 1958 as a national communicator with foreign grand lodges . To avoid name confusion, the United Grand Lodge of Germany changed its name to Grand Land AFAM from Germany and later to Grand Lodge AFAM of Germany. At the founding of VGLvD there were initially only two founding members. The Grand National Mother Lodge only joined in 1970 as an independent partner.

== Structure ==
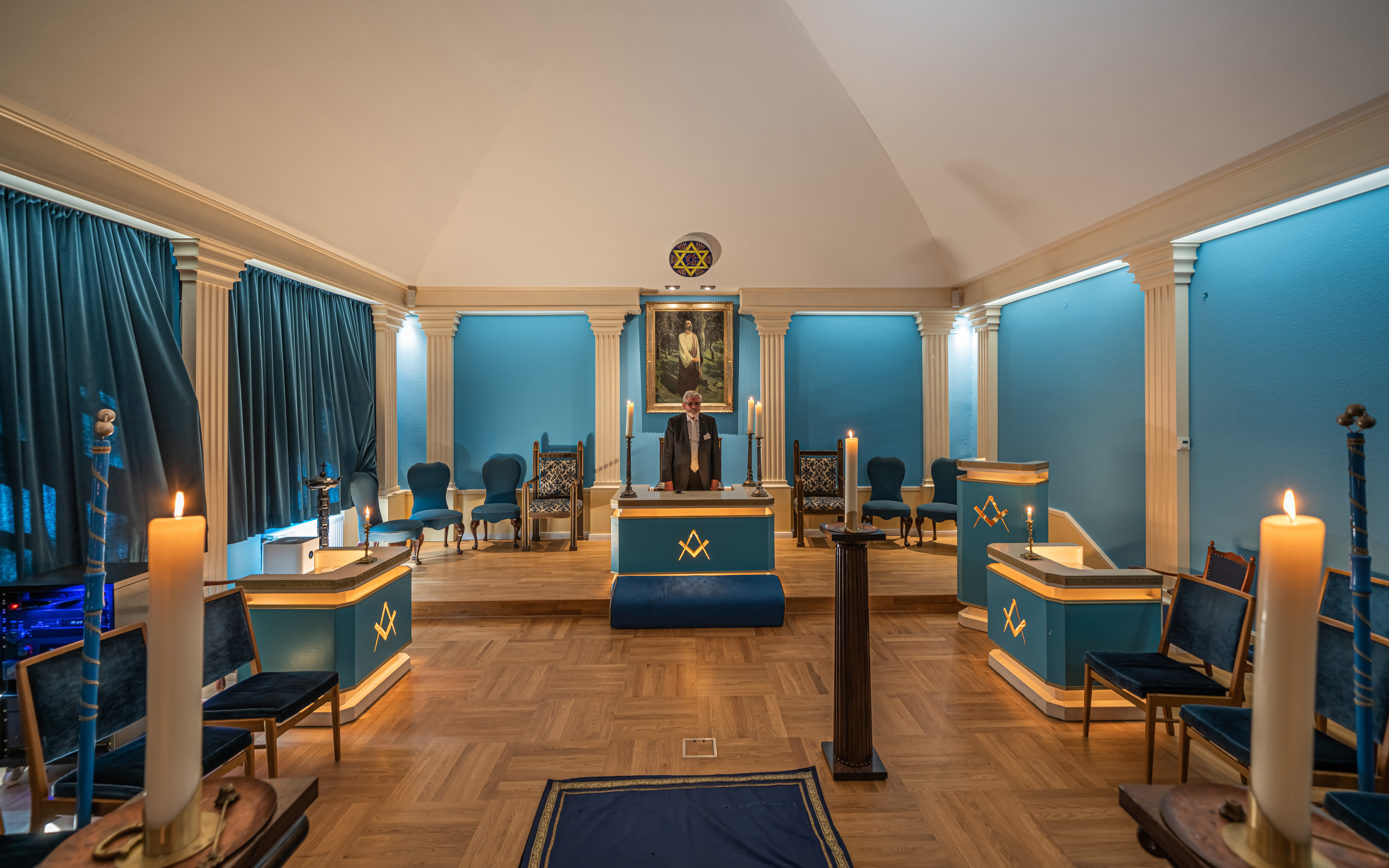
Masonic temple in the Lodge House GNML "3WK" Heerstrasse, Berlin, Germany

The Grand National Mother Lodge became a legal entity by royal charter on 9 November 1796. It is now a registered association. It is headed by the National Grand Master, supported since 1797 by the Federal Board of brothers with the highest degree. Similar to the Grand Landlodge of Freemasons of Germany, the GNML has separate bodies for the "higher degrees". In addition to the St. Johns lodges, administering the first three degrees of "apprentice," "journeyman" and "Master", there is the 'General Old Scottish Lodge' for the 4th grade ("Scots Master") and the inner Orient for grade 5-7 ("Elect brothers", "Elect of the inner temple", "Intimate of perfection").

== Known members ==
- Frederick the Great, * 1712, † 1786 (was not a member of the lodge, but its founder and protector. His royal lodge consisted exclusively of noble Freemasons, after its dissolution in 1742 he joined no further lodges.)
- Duke Ferdinand of Brunswick-Wolfenbüttel, * 1721, † 1792, German Field Marshal
- Duke Friedrich August of Brunswick, * 1740, † 1805
- Leopold Wilhelm of Dobschütz, * 1763, † 1836
- Theodor Gottlieb von Hippel the Elder, * 1741, † 1796, German statesman, writer and social critic
- Theodor Gottlieb von Hippel the Younger, * 1775, † 1843, Prussian statesman and author of the call "To My People" of 1813
- Job von Witzleben, * 1783, † 1873, Prussian Lieutenant General and Deputy Minister of War
- Georg Friedrich Kersting, * 1785, † 1847, German painter of the Romantic and Biedermeier
- Ernst Paul Lehmann, * 1856, † 1934, factory owner
- Karl Ernst August Sachs, * 1829, † 1909, linguist
- Gustav Stresemann, * 1878, † 1929, German Chancellor and Foreign Minister

== Bibliography ==
- Franz August v. Etzel: Geschichte der Großen National-Mutter-Loge der Preußischen Staaten genannt zu den drei Weltkugeln, Berlin 1867, Google books
- Eugen Lennhoff/Oskar Posner: Internationales Freimaurer-Lexikon. Amalthea-Verlag Wien–München 1980, Reprint von 1932, ISBN 3-85002-038-X
- Helmut Neuberger: Winkelmaß und Hakenkreuz: Die Freimaurer und das Dritte Reich. Herbig Verlag, München 2001, ISBN 3-7766-2222-9
- Ferdinand Runkel: Geschichte der Freimaurerei. Hobbing, Berlin, 3 Bde., Nachdruck: Edition Lempertz, Bonn 2006, ISBN 3-933070-96-1
- Br. Werner Schwartz: Friedrich der Große und sein Verhältnis zur Freimaurerei, Versuch einer Deutung. Große Nationalmutterloge "Zu den drei Weltkugeln" 2. überarbeitete Auflage o.J.
