= American Canadian Grand Lodge =

The American Canadian Grand Lodge AF&AM (ACGL) is a Grand Lodge of Freemasonry. It arose initially from Square and Compass clubs founded by US and Canadian freemasons serving in occupied Germany immediately after World War II. Many received charters from North American Grand Lodges to establish Masonic Lodges.

They were the first or among the first internationally recognized Masonic Lodges in Germany since 1933. In 1954, the first American Lodge sought and was granted a warrant by a native German Grand Lodge. During the next year, the number expanded to nine, becoming an American-Canadian district under the United Grand Lodge (now the Grand Lodge of Ancient Free and Accepted Masons of Germany (GLAFuAMvD). Differences in language and ritual, mutually recognised, led to the establishment of first a provincial Grand Lodge, then an independent American Canadian Grand Lodge in Germany.

The American Canadian Grand Lodge is a full member of the Conference of Grand Masters of Masons in North America (COGMNA).
