= Grand Lodge of Ancient Free and Accepted Masons of Germany =

The Grand Lodge of Ancient Free and Accepted Masons of Germany (Großloge der Alten Freien und Angenommenen Maurer von Deutschland GL A.F.u.A.M.v.D. or GL AFAM) is a Masonic Grand Lodge in Germany. It is one of the founding members of the United Grand Lodges of Germany and as such it is one of the five German Grand Lodges recognized as "regular" Grand Lodges by the United Grand Lodge of England (UGLE). It was founded on 19 June 1949.
