= Women's Grand Lodge of Germany =

The Women's Grand Lodge of Germany (Frauen-Großloge von Deutschland, formerly the Grand Lodge "to Humanity", Großloge „Zur Humanität“) is a German masonic association admitting only women. It has its headquarters in Berlin, and comprises 32 feminine Masonic lodges. It was founded in Berlin in 1949 as the Masonic women's circle "to Humanity". Its founding ceremony, was held on 30 June 1949 making it the first exclusively female Masonic society in Germany, although mixed lodges of the "Droit Humain" had existed there in the 1920s.

"To Humanity" continued until 1982 under the protection of the Grand Lodge of Ancient Free and Accepted Masons of Germany, district of Berlin. In that year, "to Humanity" became a Grand Lodge. This was made possible because in 1982 two women's lodges were founded in Düsseldorf and Wetzlar, so that the three Masters in the chair of the three women's lodges could establish a Grand Lodge. The Grand Master and the Grand Officers were now able to officially establish additional member lodges.
