= Grand Lodge =

Governing body of a fraternal organization

A Grand Lodge (also called Grand Orient, Grand Obedience, or other similar title) is the name for the overarching governing or supervisory body of a fraternal organization (or other similarly organized group) that uses the term “Lodge” for its local chapters. While some organizations have one single Grand Lodge that supervises all local Lodges worldwide, others have multiple, independent, Grand Lodges which supervise their local Lodges within given areas - usually a city, state, or country. In the latter case, relations between the various Grand Lodges are governed by treaties of recognition and reciprocity.

== In Freemasonry ==
A Grand Lodge, Grand Orient, or Obedience is the usual governing body of "Craft", "Blue Lodge", or "Symbolic" Freemasonry in a particular jurisdiction. The first Masonic Grand Lodge was established in England in 1717 as the Grand Lodge of London and Westminster, soon to call itself the Grand Lodge of England. The head of a Grand Lodge is called the Grand Master, and the other officers of the Grand Lodge prefix "Grand" to the titles of Lodge officers. Many Grand Lodges have also established Provincial Grand Lodges as an organizational layer between themselves and member Lodges. In the United States, a Grand Lodge will often divide its area of control into "Districts" or "Regions."

There is no central body to oversee all of the Grand Lodges in the world (nor, indeed, all of Freemasonry), and therefore, individual Grand Lodge policies and practices can and do vary, however, they have a similar basic framework in common. The lack of a central authority means that Grand Lodges are held together simply by fellowship with one another.

=== Jurisdictions ===
Grand Lodge jurisdictions are typically based on areas of civil government, with a separate Grand Lodge governing Masonic lodges within a particular national or state boundary. Each Grand Lodge functions independently of any other Grand Lodge, setting its own rules and rituals, and determining which other Grand Lodges to recognize. When two Grand Lodges recognize each other they are said to be "in Amity". "Amity" means that the two Grand Lodges recognize each other as being legitimate, and may allow Masons under one Grand Lodge to visit lodges of the other. A Grand Lodge that is not "in amity with" (or recognised by) another Grand Lodge will not permit its members to visit Lodges in the second Grand Lodge's jurisdiction, or vice versa. The cause of a lack of amity is usually due to a perceived or actual violation of one of the Landmarks of Freemasonry.

Furthermore, with some exceptions, especially regarding US Grand Lodges' recognition of Grand Lodges in South America, any Grand Lodge not recognised by the United Grand Lodge of England (UGLE) is also not recognised by any Grand Lodge in amity with UGLE. The largest Grand Orient in the Continental Masonic form is the Grand Orient de France.

While the United Grand Lodge of England, the Grand Lodge of Ireland and the Grand Lodge of Scotland each govern Freemasonry within their respective countries and overseas provinces, Continental European countries typically have more than one Grand Lodge per country. Historically, the United States had recognised one Grand Lodge per state, independent of the Grand Lodge of any other state. Today, most have two: a "mainstream" Grand Lodge and a Prince Hall Grand Lodge. All of the "mainstream" Grand Lodges in the United States of America are recognised by each other, and most recognise each other's Prince Hall counterparts.

Prince Hall Masonry, which was formed while Masonry in the United States was effectively segregated on racial grounds, has a predominantly black membership. Various philosophical and technical reasons historically prevented US "mainstream" Grand Lodges from recognising or acknowledging Prince Hall Grand Lodges as regular bodies operating in accordance with the Landmarks of Freemasonry. Originally having one Grand Lodge for the whole United States, separate Prince Hall Grand Lodges now operate in most US states and jurisdictions. Many PHGLs also sponsor and govern Prince Hall Lodges abroad, principally on or near US military bases. Since the early 1990s onward, most, but not all, US Grand Lodges and Prince Hall Grand Lodges began to extend mutual recognition and promote visitations and fellowship between their members.

=== Relation to other Masonic bodies ===
Other organisations which only accept Master Masons, such as the SRIA, Scottish Rite and the Shriners, have their own governing bodies, not called Grand Lodges, which are not directly accountable to the Grand Lodge in the jurisdiction in which they operate. Other Masonically affiliated orders, such as the OES and DeMolay, are also independent. However, these organisations' governing bodies, as a rule, defer to their Grand Lodges as the essential authority over Masonry in their regions.

== Other organizations ==
The term “Grand Lodge” is not exclusive to Freemasonry. The Odd Fellows, Elks, and other similar fraternal groups also have Grand Lodges, as does the Orange Order. This is because many of them based their organizational model on that of Freemasonry.

== See also ==
- List of Masonic Grand Lodges, a list of bodies claiming to be a Masonic Grand Lodge, regardless of regularity or recognition issues
