= Eye of Providence =

Symbol

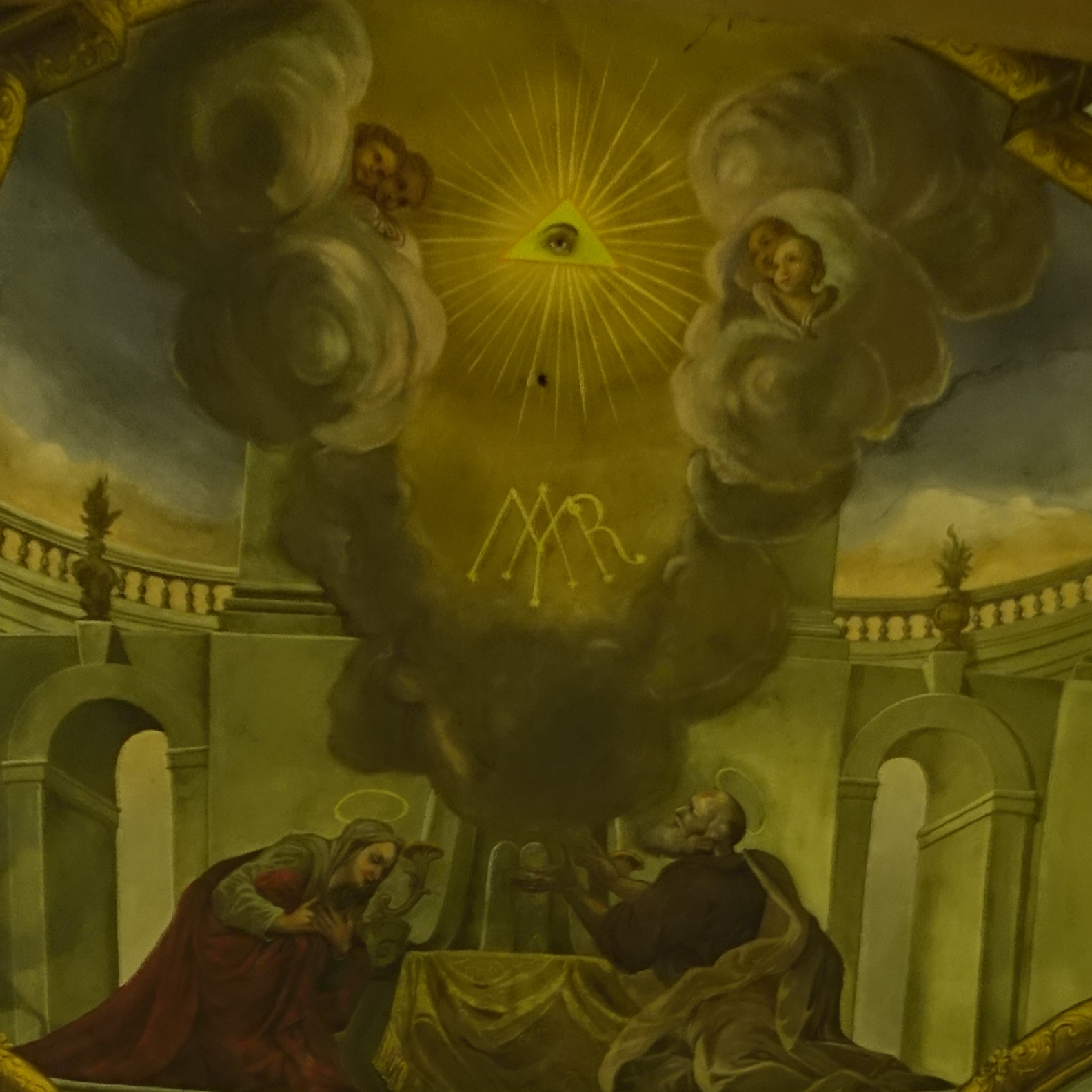
Eye of God on apse chapel ceiling in the Cathedral Basilica of the Assumption, Lviv

The Eye of Providence or All-Seeing Eye is a symbol depicting an eye, often enclosed in a triangle and surrounded by rays of light or a halo, intended to represent divine providence watching over humankind.

Historically, it was first depicted during the Renaissance period in Europe. A well-known modern example of the Eye of Providence appears on the reverse of the Great Seal of the United States, eventually integrated on the United States one-dollar bill (in 1935). It also featured prominently atop the original publication of France's Declaration of the Rights of Man and of the Citizen (1789).

The Eye of Providence also figures prominently in the symbolism of Caodism, which is a syncretic religion established in Vietnam in 1926.

== Religious and fraternal representations ==
=== Christianity ===
The association of an eye with the concept of Divine Providence is found in Christianity. In Late Renaissance European iconography, the Eye, surrounded by a triangle, was an explicit symbol of the Christian Holy Trinity. The Eye of Providence was later painted above an image of three faces in Pontormo's 1525 Supper at Emmaus. Seventeenth-century depictions of the Eye sometimes show it surrounded by clouds or sunbursts. The Eye of God in a triangle is still used in church architecture and Christian art to symbolize the Trinity and God's omnipresence and divine providence.

The Eye of Providence is notably featured on the following buildings of the Roman Catholic Church, Eastern Orthodoxy, and The Church of Jesus Christ of Latter-day Saints:

- The Mannheim Jesuit Church in Mannheim, Germany
- The Kazan Cathedral in Saint Petersburg, Russia
- The Shio-Mgvime Monastery in Mtskheta, Georgia
- The Salt Lake Temple in Salt Lake City, Utah

=== Freemasonry ===
Commonly, the Eye of Providence is often associated with Freemasonry, first appearing as part of the standard Freemason iconography in 1797 with the publication of Thomas Smith Webb's The Freemason's Monitor. In this use, the Eye, representing the all-seeing eye of God, serves as a reminder that humanity's thoughts and deeds are always observed by God—who is referred to in Masonry as the Great Architect of the Universe. Typically, the Masonic Eye of Providence has a semicircular glory below it, and is sometimes enclosed by a triangle. Popular among conspiracy theorists is the claim that the Eye of Providence shown atop an unfinished pyramid on the Great Seal of the United States indicates the influence of Freemasonry in the founding of the United States. However, common Masonic use of the Eye dates to 14 years after the creation of the Great Seal. Furthermore, the only Mason among the members of the various design committees for the Great Seal was Benjamin Franklin, whose ideas for the seal were not adopted. Likewise, various Masonic organizations have explicitly denied any connection to the creation of the Seal.

== Governmental use ==
Eye of Providence from the reverse of the Great Seal of the United States, as seen on the U.S. $1 bill

The Eye, featured on a palm (flag of the Confederation of the Equator, a short-lived rebellion that occurred in the northeastern region of the Empire of Brazil, 1824)

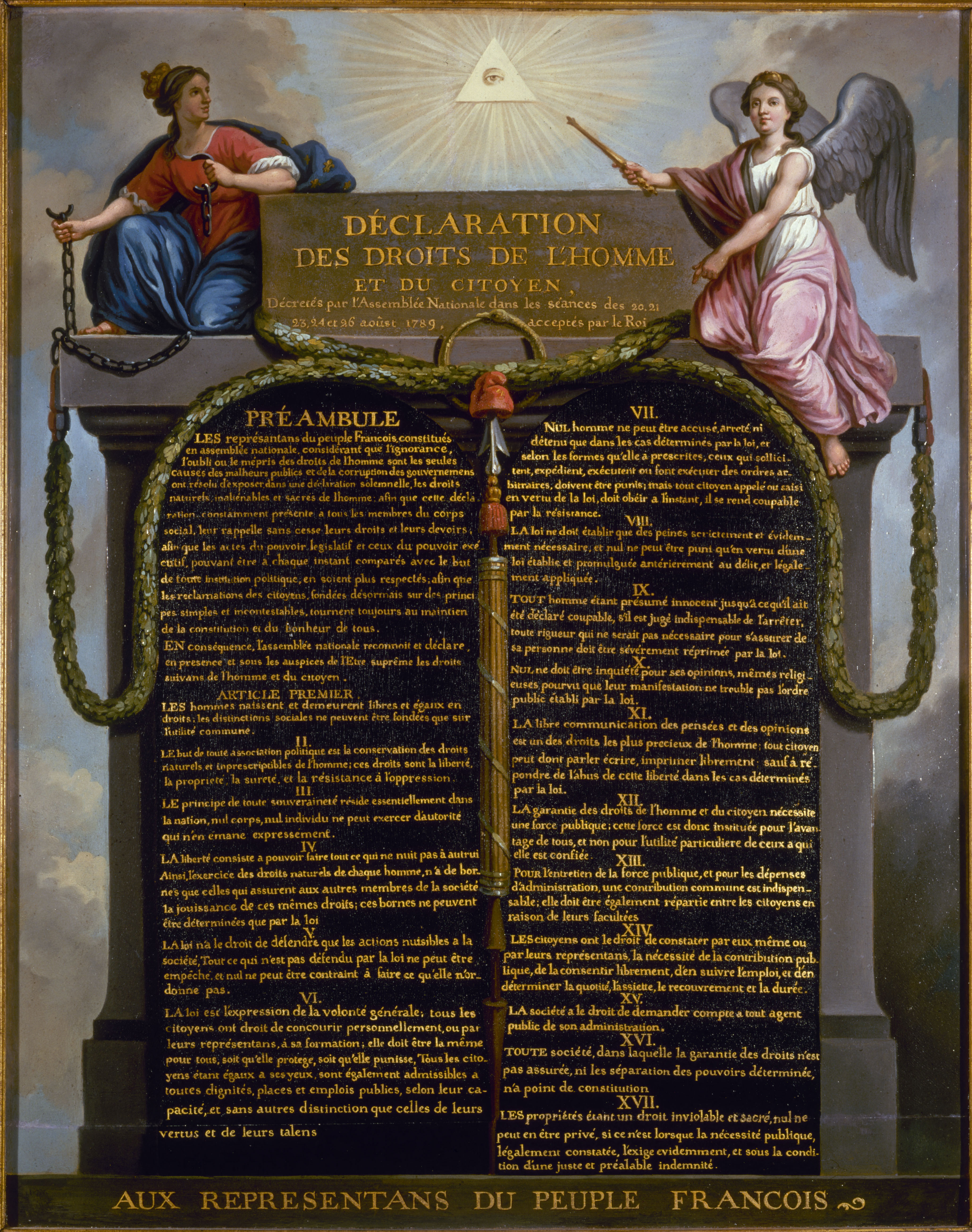
Marquis de Lafayette and Thomas Jefferson, alongside Abbé Sieyès, and Honoré Mirabeau, were the primary constitutional architects of the Declaration of the Rights of Man and of the Citizen, which features the Eye of Providence at the top. Decreed early in the French Revolution by the Assembly in France (1789), the document was illustrated by French artist, Jean-Jacques-François Le Barbier (1738-1826).

=== United States ===
In 1782, the Eye of Providence was adopted as part of the symbolism featured on the reverse side of the Great Seal of the United States. It was first proposed as an element of the Great Seal by the first of three design committees in 1776, and it is thought to be the suggestion of the artistic consultant Pierre Eugene du Simitiere. At the time, it was a conventional symbol for God’s benevolent oversight.

In his original proposal to the committee, du Simitiere placed the Eye over shields so as to symbolize each of the original thirteen states of the Union. On the version of the seal that would eventually be approved, the Eye is positioned above an unfinished pyramid of thirteen steps (again symbolizing the original States, but also incorporating the nation's potential for future growth). Such symbolism is explained through the motto that appears above the Eye, annuit cœptis, meaning "He approves [our] undertakings" (or "has approved").

Perhaps due to its use in the design of the Great Seal, the Eye has made its way into other American seals and logos, such as, for example:

- The Seal of Colorado
- The city seal of Kenosha, Wisconsin
- DARPA's Information Awareness Office

==== U.S. currency ====
The Eye of Providence has been used among various forms of currency throughout U.S. history, including:

- colonial paper currency (visible in the collection of the Museum of American History)
- the United States one-dollar bill, as part of the Great Seal (from Series 1935 design introduced under President Franklin D. Roosevelt)
- the Vermont Copper
- Nova Constellatio patterns of 1783
- Nova Constellatio coppers of 1783 and 1785
- some Immune Columbia issues

=== Other countries ===
The Eye of Providence appears in France's Declaration of the Rights of Man and of the Citizen, and it appears on the front page of the Constitution of Serbia (from 1835).

It appears prominently on several Lithuanian coats of arms, including those of Alovė, Baisogala, Kalvarija, Plungė and Šiauliai (for the last two, Eyes appear in their flags as well). The Eye is also a feature in the coats of arms of Victoria, Canada, and in the coats of arms of Brasłaŭ in Belarus, the state of Neman, Russia, in Radekhiv, Ukraine, as well as in the coats of arms of Radzymin and Wilamowice, Poland. The Eye of Providence was also part of the flag and coat of arms adopted by the Confederation of the Equator, a short-lived 1824 secessionist revolt in the northeastern provinces of Brazil. In the United Kingdom, the symbol was part of the Guards Division insignia, created in 1915. In Nigeria, the Eye symbol is part of the Nigeria Customs Service logo.

In Estonia, the 50 krooni note shows the Eye as part of a depiction of the pipe organ of the Käina church. Likewise, the (old) 500 Ukrainian hryvnia note also depicts the Eye.

In United Kingdom, the arrangement of the judges' bench and the main seating area of the Supreme Court, when viewed from above, resembles the shape of an eye.

== University/college insignia and logos of organizations ==
Several universities and college fraternities use the Eye of Providence in their coats of arms, seals, or badges, notably:

- Delta Tau Delta based in Fishers, Indiana
- Phi Kappa Psi based in Indianapolis, Indiana
- Phi Delta Theta based in Oxford, Ohio
- Delta Kappa Epsilon based in Ann Arbor, Michigan
- Princeton Theological Seminary in Princeton, New Jersey
- The University of Chile in Santiago, Chile
- The University of Mississippi in Oxford, Mississippi

== Versions in pop culture ==
- In the cartoon Gravity Falls, there is a character called Bill Cipher that resembles the Eye of Providence.

== Gallery ==
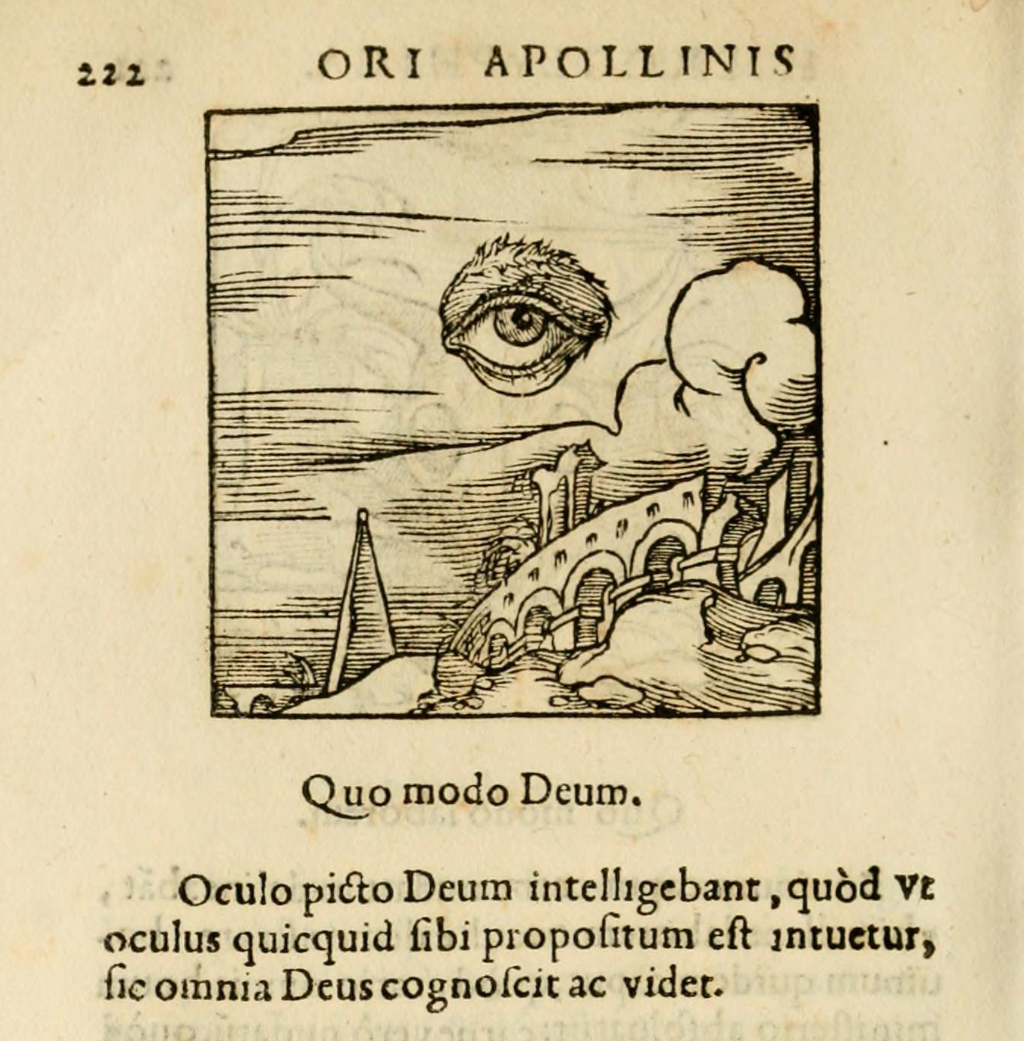
Woodcut from Horapollo's Hieroglyphica (1505), which reads Quo modo Deum (lit. 'This is the way of God'), with the All-Seeing Eye floating in the sky (Note: The description below the title of the woodcut reads, Oculo piƐto [sic] Deum intelligebant, quòd vt oculus quicquid sibi propositum est intuetur, sic omnia Deus cognoscit ac videt, which translates to, 'They understood God with a pious eye, because just as the eye looks at whatever is presented to it, so God knows and sees everything.')

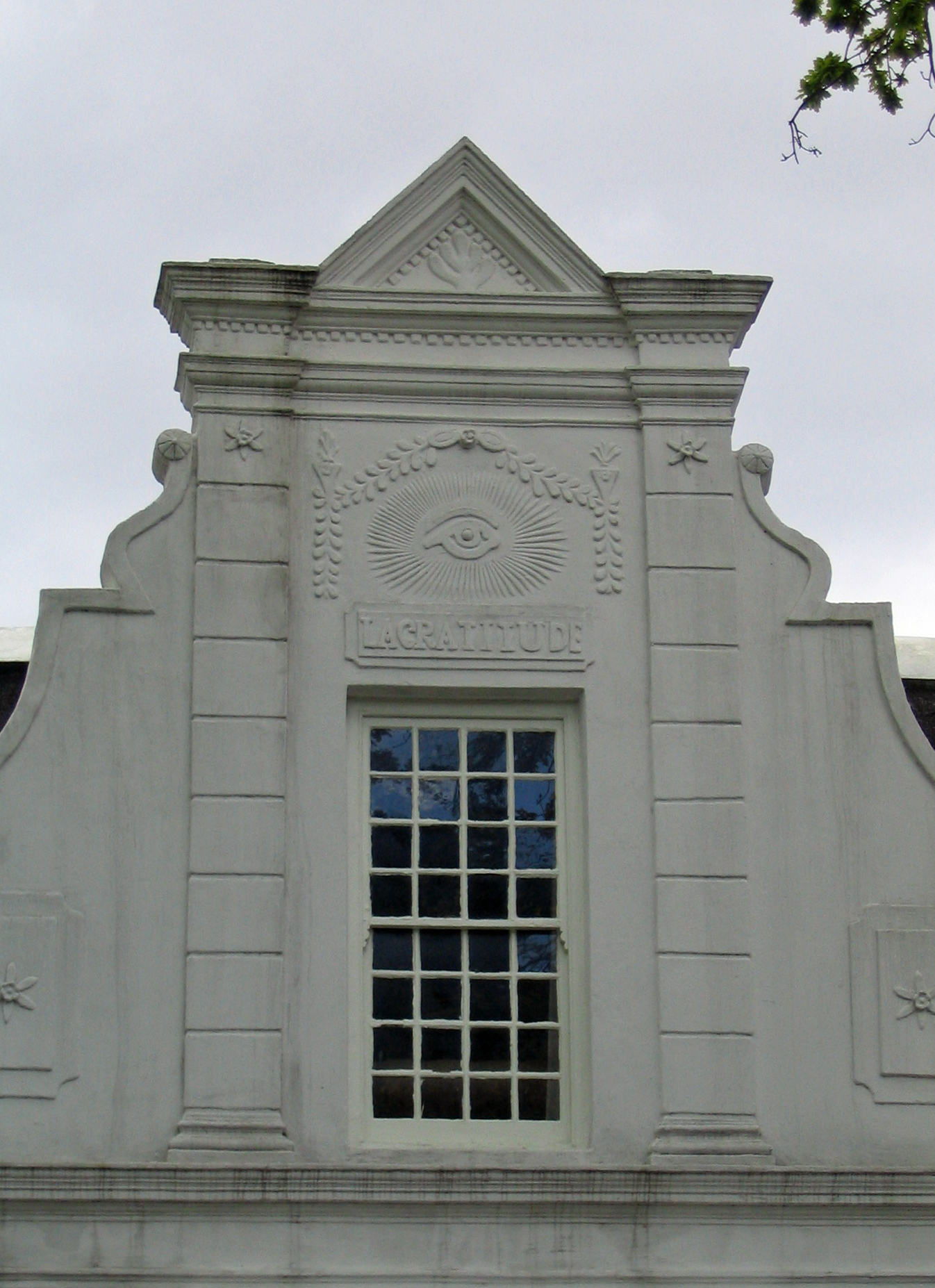
All-Seeing Eye in a Cape Dutch gable in Stellenbosch, South Africa

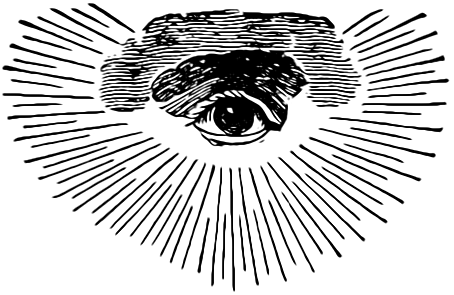
An early Masonic version of the Eye, with clouds and a semi-circular glory

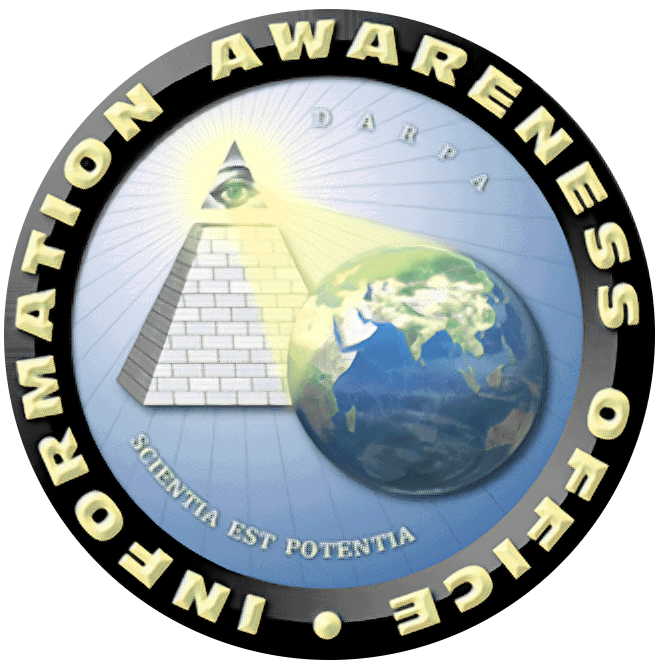
Original seal of the DARPA Information Awareness Office

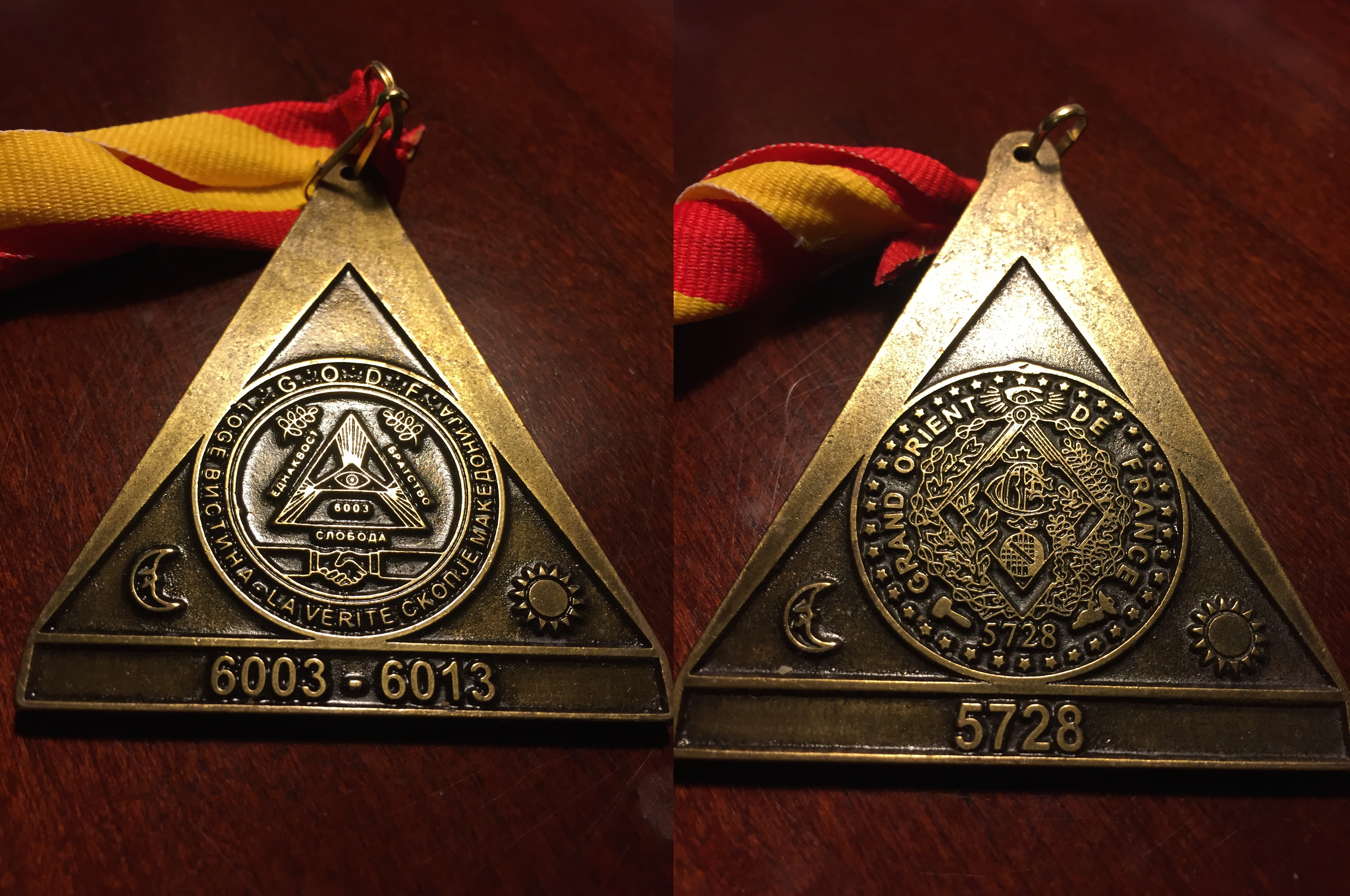
The Eye of Providence depicted on the "Vistina – La Verite", a medallion issued by the Masonic Lodge in Skopje, North Macedonia

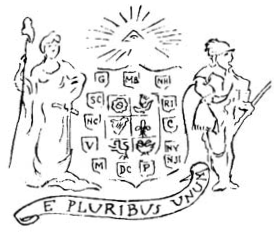
Restored original design for the Great Seal of the United States by Pierre Eugène du Simitière

Princeton Theological Seminary

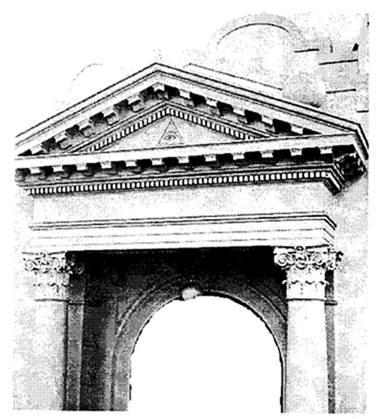
All-Seeing Eye in a pediment of an Esoteric Christian temple in Mount Ecclesia, California

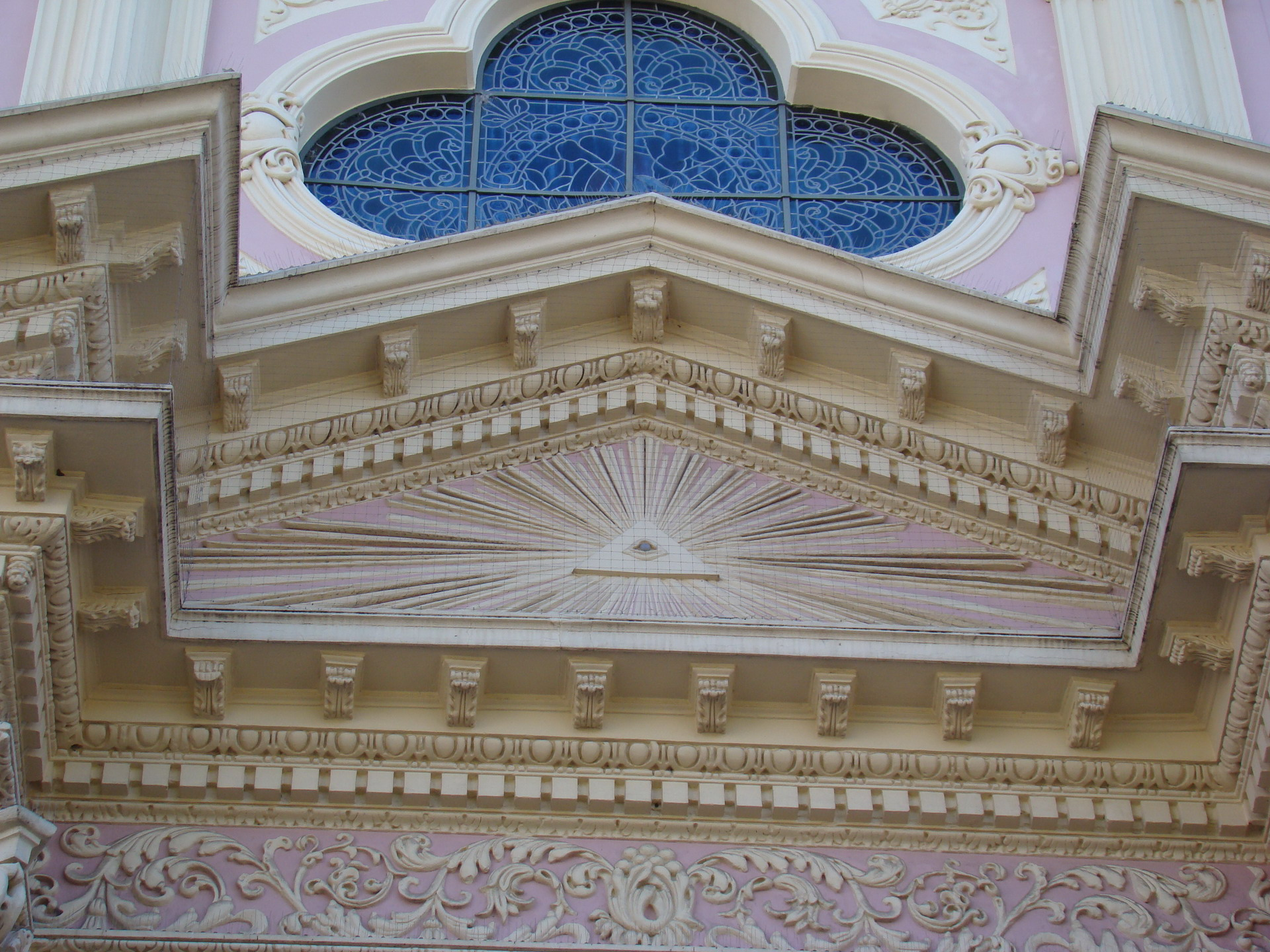
Eye of Providence on the exterior of a cathedral in Salta, Argentina

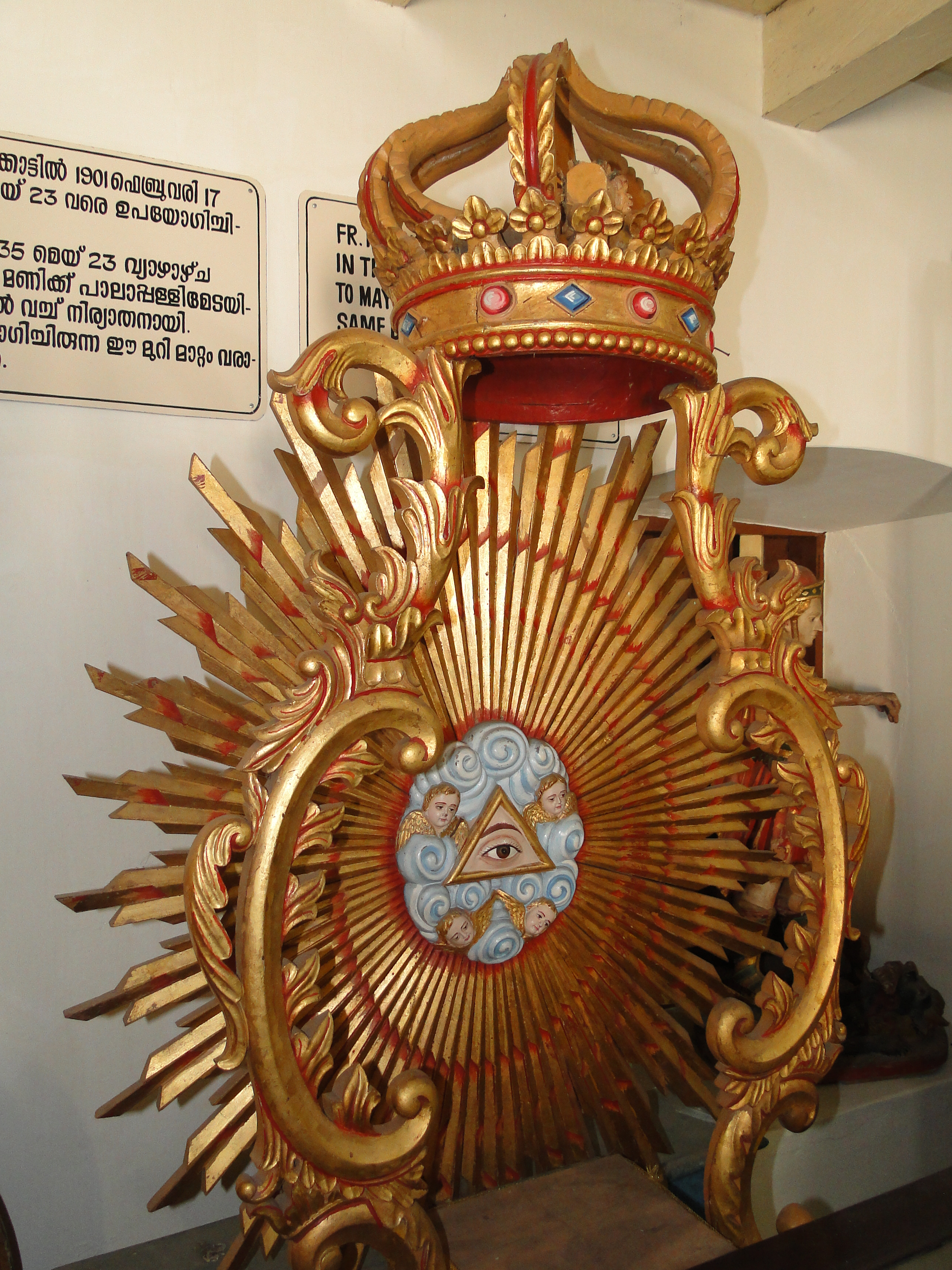
Eye of Providence depicted on altar equipment, now in a museum in Pala, Kerala, India

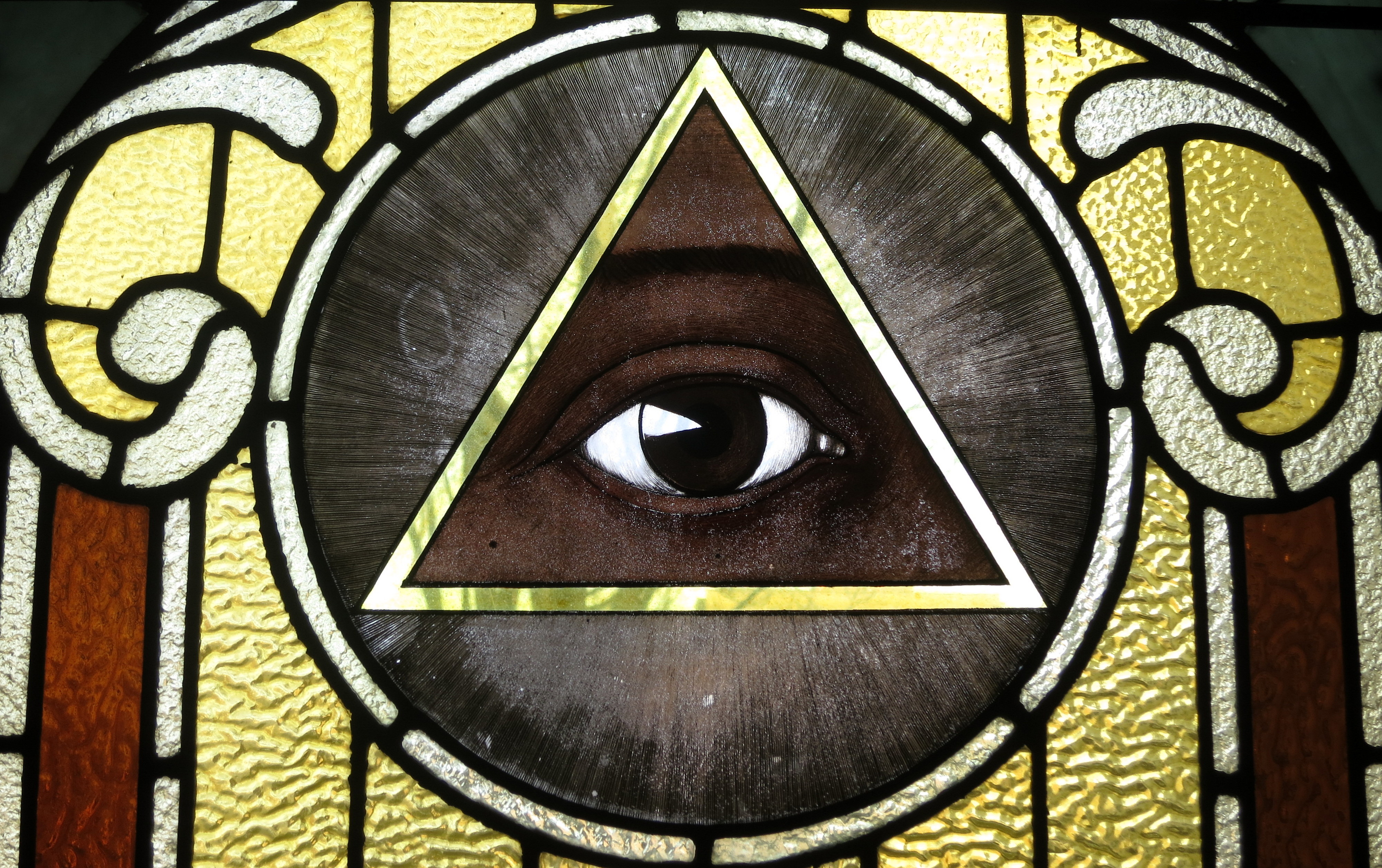
Eye of Providence depicted in a stained glass window, St. Raphael Catholic Church (Springfield, Ohio)

Coat of arms of Braslaw, Belarus

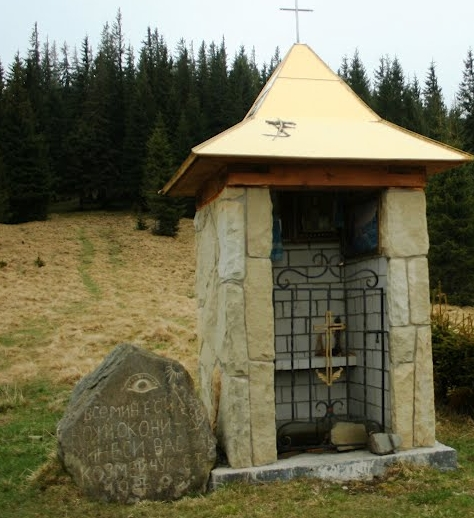
God Eye in West Ukraine (Ukrainian Carpathians) near Mykulychyn village. The inscription on the stone, written in an old Ukrainian dialect, translates to "All will pass but God's eye does not pass you."

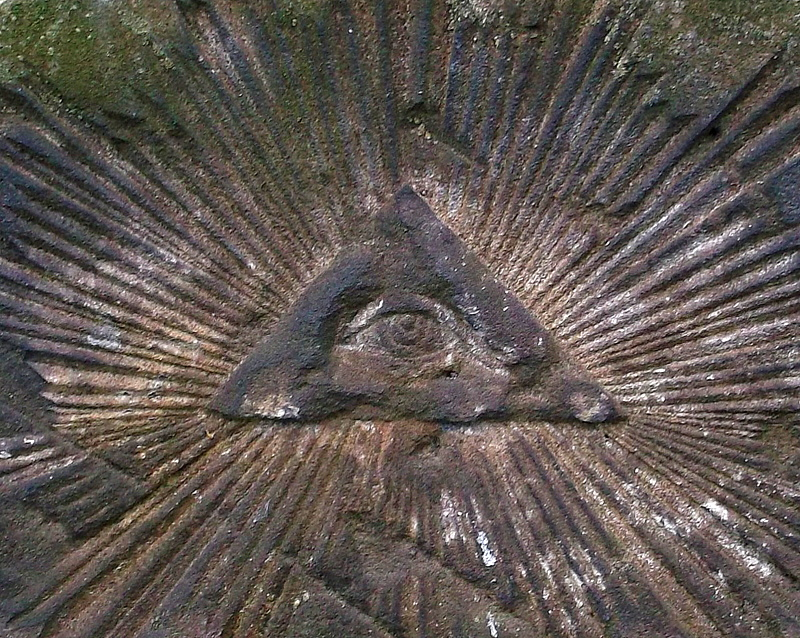
The Eye of Providence in a Jewish cemetery in Kamienna Góra

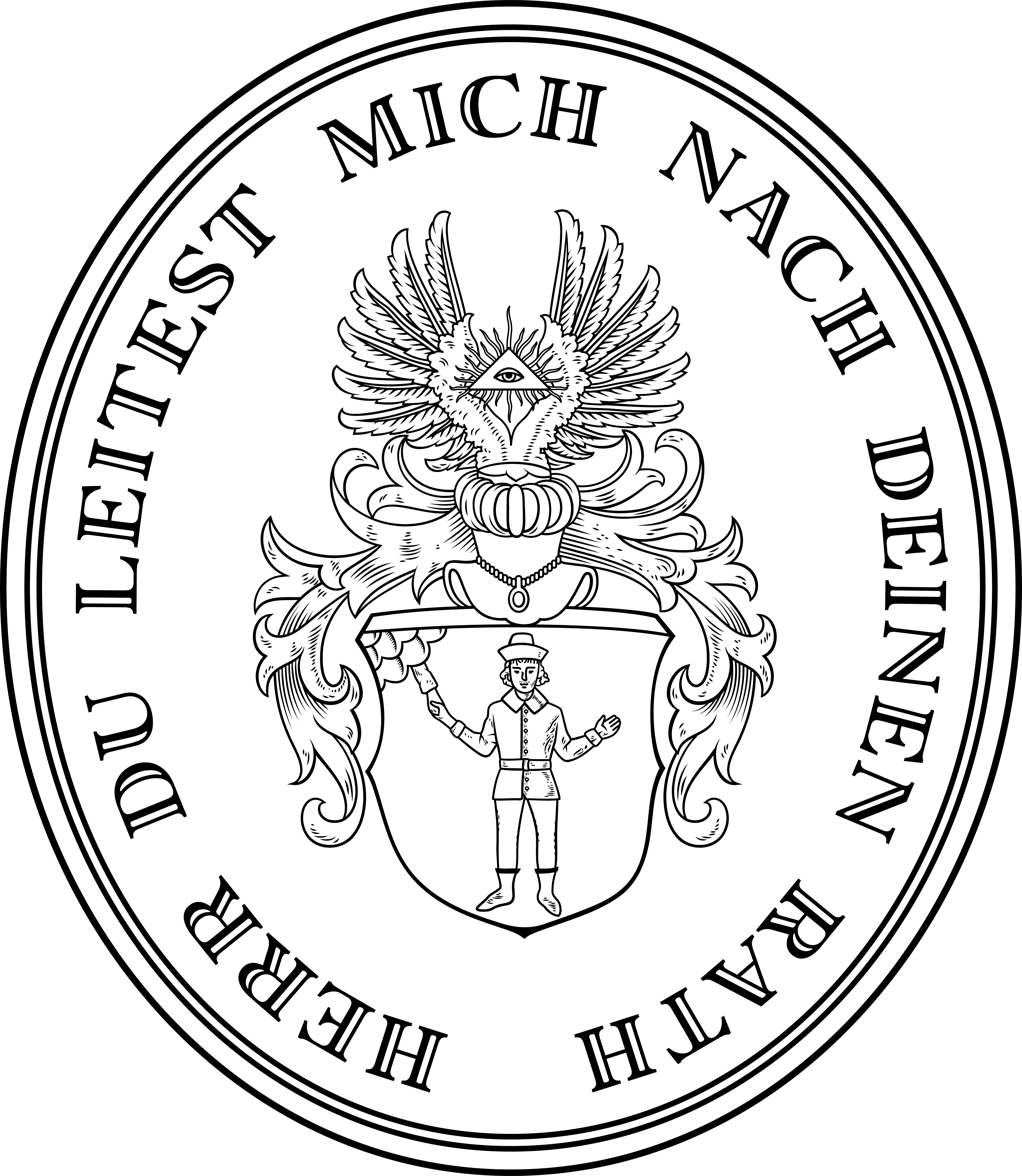
Eye of Providence in the canting arms of the Jauch family (motto: "Lord thou shalt guide me with thy counsel", Psalm 73:24)

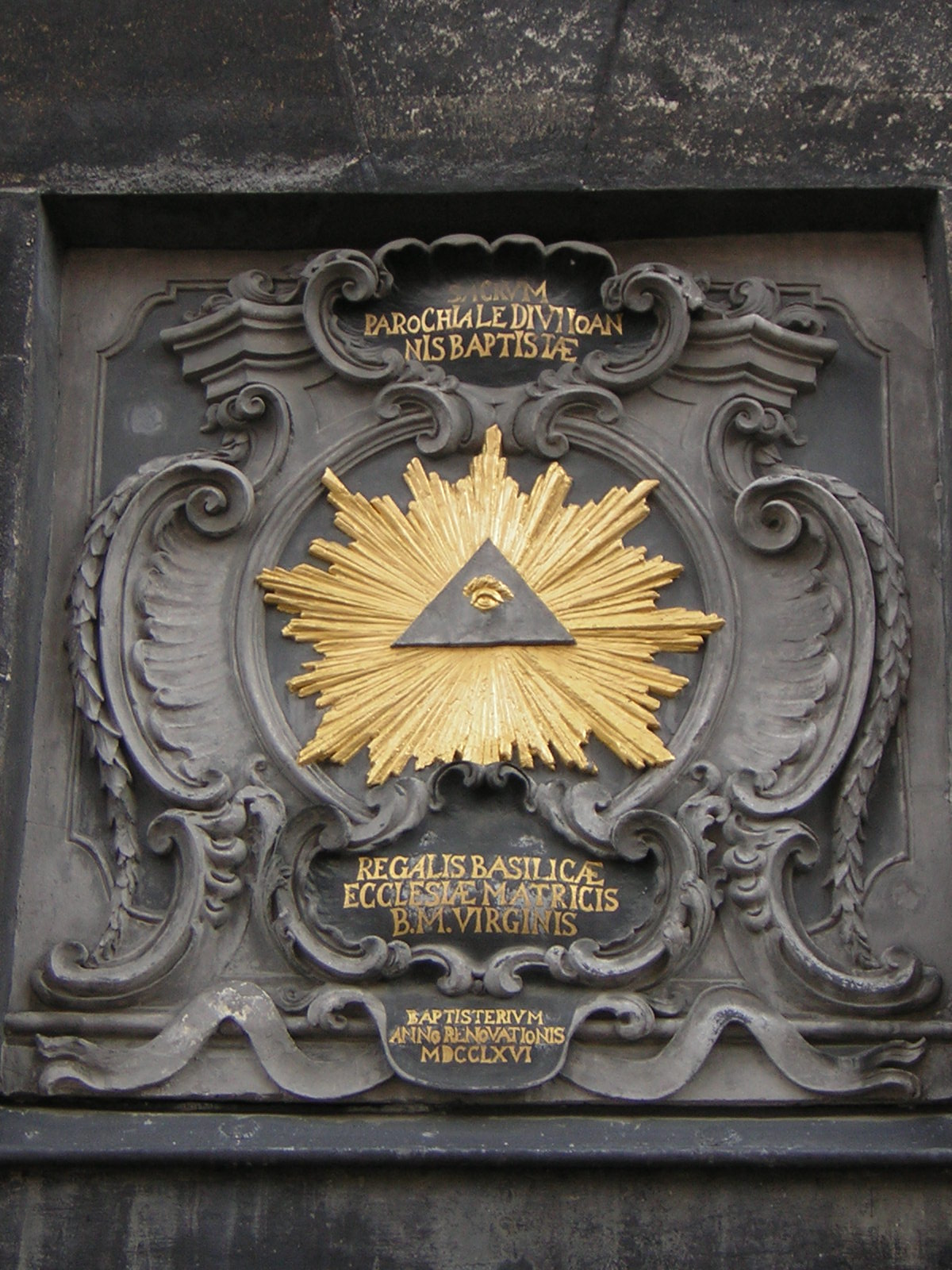
All-Seeing Eye on the gate of Aachen Cathedral

== See also ==
- Divine Eye (Caodaism)
- Eye of Horus and Eye of Ra
- Third eye
