= Coat of arms of Victoria =

Coat of arms of Victoria may refer to:

- Coat of arms of Victoria (Australia)
- Coat of arms of Victoria, British Columbia
- Coat of arms of Victoria, Chile
- Coat of arms of Victoria, Gozo, Malta
- Coat of arms of Ciudad Victoria, Mexico
- Coat of arms of Victoria, Brașov, Romania
- The personal coat of arms of Queen Victoria; see royal coat of arms of the United Kingdom

== See also ==
- Victoria (disambiguation)
