= Research lodge =

Basic organisational unit

A Research lodge is a particular type of Masonic lodge which is devoted to Masonic research. It is a lodge, and as such has a charter from some Grand Lodge. However, it does not confer degrees, and restricts membership to Master Masons of some jurisdiction in amity with the jurisdiction that the research lodge is in. Related to research lodges are Masonic research societies, which serve the same purpose but function fundamentally differently. There are research lodges in most countries where Freemasonry exists.

The oldest research lodge is Quatuor Coronati No. 2076, founded in 1886 under the jurisdiction of the United Grand Lodge of England. It accepts members from all over the world through its Correspondence Circle. A book of transactions called Ars Quatuor Coronatorum (which includes the papers given in the lodge) has been published every year since 1886.

Most research lodges have some type of transactions, proceedings, or even just a newsletter that is published regularly.

== United States ==
- California has five research lodges chartered under the Grand Lodge of California:

The Northern California Research Lodge in San Francisco was chartered in 1940.
The Southern California Research Lodge, chartered in 1952, publishes a monthly magazine, "The Fraternal Review," and meets quarterly at the South Pasadena Masonic Temple in Los Angeles.
The El Camino Research Lodge, located in Palo Alto, California
The Orange County Research Lodge
The Golden Compasses Research Lodge, based in Folsom, Sacramento County.

- Colorado has one research lodge: Research Lodge of Colorado, chartered in 1953 by the Grand Lodge of Colorado in Denver, and currently meets at the Park Hill Masonic Hall in the Park Hill neighborhood of Denver.
- Connecticut is home to two research lodges:

The Philosophic Lodge of Research, based in Cromwell
The Masonic Lodge of Research No. 401, in New Haven

- Delaware Lodge of Research, in Wilmington
- The District of Columbia is home to the David A. McWilliams, Sr. Research and Education Lodge, F&AM - Prince Hall Affiliated. Working under the Prince Hall Jurisdiction of the District of Columbia, it is dedicated to the conduct of research and education about Freemasonry in general and Prince Hall Freemasonry.
- The Florida Lodge of Research, No. 999 - charter issued by the Grand Lodge of Florida.
- Georgia Lodge of Research - As well as Research Lodge #1 of Savannah.
- Illinois is home to the Illinois Lodge of Research, charted by the Grand Lodge AF&AM of Illinois in 1976.
- Indiana: The Dwight L. Smith Lodge of Research (U.D.) - Indiana's only Lodge of Research. Usually meets in Indianapolis.
- The Iowa Research Lodge #2
- Kentucky has two research lodges:

The Ted Adams Lodge of Research in Paintsville
The William O. Ware Lodge of Research in Covington.

- The Maine Lodge of Research - charter issued by the Grand Lodge of Maine, AF&AM in 1982.
- The Massachusetts Chapter of Research - notable in that it is chartered as a York Rite Royal Arch Chapter, and tends to focus on Chapter-specific research. There is also the Massachusetts Lodge of Research.
- Michigan has four research lodges chartered under the Grand Lodge of Michigan:

The Michigan Lodge of Research & Information No. 1, F&AM, which began as a conversation between Brothers Robert Osbourne and Donald Van Kirk in December 1982, was chartered by the Grand Lodge of Michigan, F&AM, on May 29th, 1985. The lodge is located on the 5th floor of the historic Detroit Masonic Temple, the world's largest Masonic Temple. The Michigan Lodge of Research & Information No. 1 is the successor of the Masonic Library of Detroit, that operated from October 14th, 1882, to ca. December 1932.

Alexandria Lodge of Research & Study No. 2, F&AM. The lodge is located at the Grand Rapids Masonic Center in Grand Rapids, Mich.

Pythagoras Lodge of Research and Information No. 3, F&AM. The lodge is located at the Lansing Masonic Temple Association in Lansing, Mich.

Fiat Lux Lodge of Research and Education U.D., F&AM. The lodge is located at the Marquette Masonic Lodge in Marquette, Mich.

- The Mississippi Lodge of Research No. 640 - charter issued by the Grand Lodge of Mississippi.
- The Missouri Lodge of Research - charter issued by the Grand Lodge of Missouri, AF&AM on September 30, 1941, under the direction of Harry S. Truman
- The Nevada Lodge of Research #2 - Nevada Lodge of Research #2 is a Regular and Recognized masonic lodge located in Las Vegas, NV, having a charter through the Grand Lodge of NV, F&AM, which is recognized by the United Grand Lodge of England.
- New Hampshire: Anniversary Lodge of Research #175
- The New Jersey Lodge of Masonic Research and Education, No. 1786 - warrant issued by the Grand Lodge of New Jersey.
- New York has three research lodges:

The American Lodge of Research is the oldest research lodge in the United States, having been founded in 1931. It is chartered under the Grand Lodge of New York, and meets in the City of New York.
The Western New York Lodge of Research
Thomas Smith Webb Chapter of Research No. 1798, chartered under the Grand Council of New York in 2002, devotes its studies to Royal Arch Chapter related issues.

- The North Carolina Lodge of Research, No. 666. First Stated Communication Nov. 11, 1930 and demised Dec 31, 1954. Published nineteen volumes from 1931-1949.
- The Ohio Lodge of Research
- The Research Lodge of Oregon Number 198, Chartered June 16, 1932, under the Grand Lodge of Oregon. It is the third research lodge chartered in the United States, the oldest research lodge on the West Coast and the second oldest research lodge in America.
- The Pennsylvania Lodge of Research
- Rhode Island is home to the COLLEGIVM LVMINOSVM
- The Tennessee Lodge of Research
- The Texas Lodge of Research
- Vermont is home to one research lodge - The Edward J. Wildblood, Jr., Vermont Lodge of Research #110.
- Virginia has eight research lodges:

Virginia Research Lodge No. 1777 in Highland Springs
The A. Douglas Smith, Jr. Lodge of Research No. 1949 at the George Washington Masonic National Memorial in Alexandria
The Civil War Lodge of Research No. 1865 in various Masonic Lodges near Civil War battlefields
The Peyton Randolph Lodge of Research No. 1774, in Colonial Williamsburg
The James Noah Hillman Lodge of Research No. 1883, which meets in southwestern Virginia
The George Washington Lodge of Research No. 1732, at George Washington's Mother Lodge in Fredericksburg
Virginia Research Priory No. 1823, The first Knights Templar Research Priory in the US. It is devoted to research about the Knights Templar.
Virginia Research Chapter No.1753, A Royal Arch Chapter dedicated to research concerning Capitular Masonry.

- Washington State has two research lodges:

Walter F. Meyer Lodge of Research No. 281
Eastern Washington Lodge of Research No. 310

== Australia ==
- Discovery Lodge of Research No. 971, Chartered under the United Grand Lodge of New South Wales & Australian Capital Territory in 1968.
- Barron Barnett Lodge of Research No. 146 Chartered under the United Grand Lodge of Antient Free & Accepted Masons of Queensland www.barronbarnett.org.au
- The Western Australian Lodge of Research No. 277 Chartered under the Grand Lodge of Antient Free & Accepted Masons of Western Australia
- Victorian Lodge of Research No. 218 Chartered under the United Grand Lodge of Antient Free & Accepted Masons of Victoria
- Holden Research Circle, chartered under the United Grand Lodge of Antient Free & Accepted Masons of Victoria in 1945.

== Canada ==
- British Columbia has two research lodges licensed by Grand Lodge of British Columbia and Yukon:

Vancouver Lodge of Education and Research licensed
Victoria Lodge of Education and Research

- Ontario has one research lodge licensed by Grand Lodge of Canada in the Province of Ontario:

Heritage Lodge No. 730

== Chile ==
- There are three Lodges under the auspices of Grand Lodge of Chile:
  - Lodge of Research Pentalpha No. 119, Santiago.
  - Lodge of Research Masoneria Azul No. 243, Valparaiso.
  - Lodge of Research Estrella del Biobio No. 251, Concepcion.

== Denmark ==
- Forskningslogen Friederich Münter, No 1 under Den Danske Frimurerorden

== Germany ==
- Past Masters Research Lodge No. 950 in Schweinfurt under the American Canadian Grand Lodge within the United Grand Lodges of Germany works in the English language, research and educates on the ritual used within the ACGL.
- The Premier Lodge of Masonic Research Quatuor Coronati No. 2076, London under the UGLE is working in the English language (amongst others). At a minimum some English-speaking German lodges (in their own right) hold membership in its Correspondence Circle (e.g. Bavaria Lodge) and it also has a Local Secretary.
- Quatuor Coronati Forschungsloge Nr. 808 in Bayreuth, is an independent research lodge working in the German language researching German Freemasonry. Its charter was issued in 1951 under the United Grand Lodges of Germany

== Greece ==
- Lodge of Research Isis No. 9, the premier research lodge in Greece. It is chartered under the National Grand Lodge of Greece and meets in Athens.
- Lodge of Research Posseidonia No. 33. It is chartered under the National Grand Lodge of Greece and meets in Piraeus.
- Lodge of Research Archimedes No. 35. It is chartered under the National Grand Lodge of Greece and meets in Patras.
- Lodge of Research Plato No. 70. It is chartered under the National Grand Lodge of Greece and meets in Athens.

== Ireland ==
- Lodge of Research, No. CC

== Japan ==
- Tokyo Lodge of Research

== New Zealand ==
- New Zealand is home to Hawke's Bay Research Lodge No. 305.
- The Research Lodge of Ruapehu No.444, Grand Lodge of New Zealand, Palmerston North
- Masters' & Past Masters' Lodge No. 130, Christchurch
- Midland District Lodge of Research Meets at Timaru
- Research Lodge of Southland Meets at Invercargill
- Research Lodge of Wellington Meets at Udy St, Petone
- The Research Lodge of Otago Meets at Manor Place, Dunedin
- The Research Lodge of the Taranaki Province Meets at Lawry St, New Plymouth
- The Waikato Lodge of Research
- Top of the South Research Lodge Meets at Nile St, Nelson (and others);
- United Masters Lodge Meets at Khyber Pass Rd, Auckland,

== Norway ==
- Forskningslogen Niels Treschow, chartered 2003.

== Romania ==
- Research Lodge ”Gnonis” No.C3

== Russia ==
- Research Lodge "Quator Quoronati" No.8 ("Четверо Коронованных") Moscow

== Sweden ==
- Research and Education Lodge No 6 Aurora Borealis, Swedish Masonic Camp

== Singapore ==
- St. Michael Lodge No. 2933

== Turkey ==
- Mimar Sinan Lodge

== England ==
- Quatuor Coronati Lodge No. 2076.
- Ex Libris Lodge No. 3765. The Lodge focuses on the intersection of Future of Freemasonry and Information Technology.
  - Founded in 1916, and recognised as a "Hall Stone Lodge."
  - "Together, we will ensure that the values and practices of Freemasonry remain relevant, resilient, and robust, ready to inspire and guide future generations."
- Lodge of Research No.2429 Leicestershire & Rutland https://research2429.org.uk
- Jubilee Masters' Lodge No. 2712.
- Sussex Masters' Lodge No. 3672.
- East Sussex Masters' Lodge No. 8449.
- West Sussex Masters' Lodge No. 8963.
- Worthing Installed Masters' Lodge No. 9860.
- Seven Sisters Installed Masters' Lodge No. 9918.
- Veritatem Sequere Lodge No. 9615, Hertfordshire
- Temple of Athene Lodge No. 9541, Middlesex

== Scotland ==
- Lodge Felix No. 355. Province of Aberdeenshire West.Meets in Peterculter.
- The Anchor Lodge of Research No. 1814. Greenock, Inverclyde, Scotland.
- The Lodge, Hope of Kurrachee no 337, Provincial Grand Lodge of Fife and Kinross. meets Rosyth.
- Lodge Sir Robert Moray, No. 1641, Edinburgh, in honour of Robert Moray
