= Flag of Victoria =

Flag of Victoria may refer to:

- Flag of Victoria (state), a state in Australia
- Flag of Victoria, British Columbia
- Flag of Victoria, Caldas
- Flag of Victoria, Chile
- Flag of Victoria, Entre Ríos
- Flag of Victoria, Gozo

== See also ==
- Victoria (disambiguation)
