= Bavaria Lodge =

Bavaria Lodge No. 935 is the oldest English-speaking Masonic lodge in Munich, Germany.

It is currently located at Schwanthalerstr. 60/V, 80336 Munich, Germany

== Members ==
It is the premier international Masonic lodge in Munich with American, Australian, Austrian, Canadian, Croatians, Czech, Dutch, English, French, German, Croatian, Israeli, Italian, Monégasque, Nigerian, Rumanian, Syrian, Turkish, Russian nationals amongst its members, coming from all walks of life, of different crafts and professions.

Bavaria lodge's membership is said to comprise people of diverse religions, including but not limited to Catholic and Protestant Christians, Jews, and Muslims; all of which meet and accept each other as equals.

== Grand Lodge and Jurisdiction ==
Bavaria Lodge is a regular Masonic lodge working in the English-language under the Jurisdiction of the American Canadian Grand Lodge A.F. & A.M. (ACGL) in ACGL District #4 within the United Grand Lodges of Germany - brotherhood of Freemasons (VGLvD).

The ACGL is also member of the Conference of Grand Masters of Masons in North America (COGMNA) and as such recognized by all North American member Grand Lodges. This presumably allows for easier relationships with stateside Masons that remained members of Bavaria Lodge to continuously support their Bavarian Lodge in Germany whilst attending local Masonic lodge at their place of residence.

== History ==
While Bavaria Lodge was chartered (as number 935) by the United Grand Lodges of Germany on June 26, 1975, it is an amalgamation and thereby continuation of a number of much older military lodges founded by Allied forces Post-WW2, originating as early as 21. February 1957.

The amalgamation seems to have been a direct result of Allied forces being withdrawn from Germany and assigned for deployment elsewhere, thereby leading to dwindling counts of active resident members.

=== List of Past Masters of Bavaria Lodge ===
Information currently not public

=== List of Past Masters of predecessor lodges ===
Information currently not public

== Masonically Notable Members ==
- Dr. Jan E. SAVARINO - Past Grand Master of the American Canadian Grand Lodge (2019-2020) (honorary member)
- Louie E. CONINE - Past Grand Master of the American Canadian Grand Lodge (1973-1974)

== Sponsorships of other Masonic organizations through the lodge (in its own right) ==
- Freimaurer-Wiki (Freemasonry-Wiki in 5 different languages)
- Bavaria Lodge is a member of the Research lodge Quatuor Coronati No. 2076's Correspondence Circle (QCCC)
