= Robert Freke Gould =

Freemason

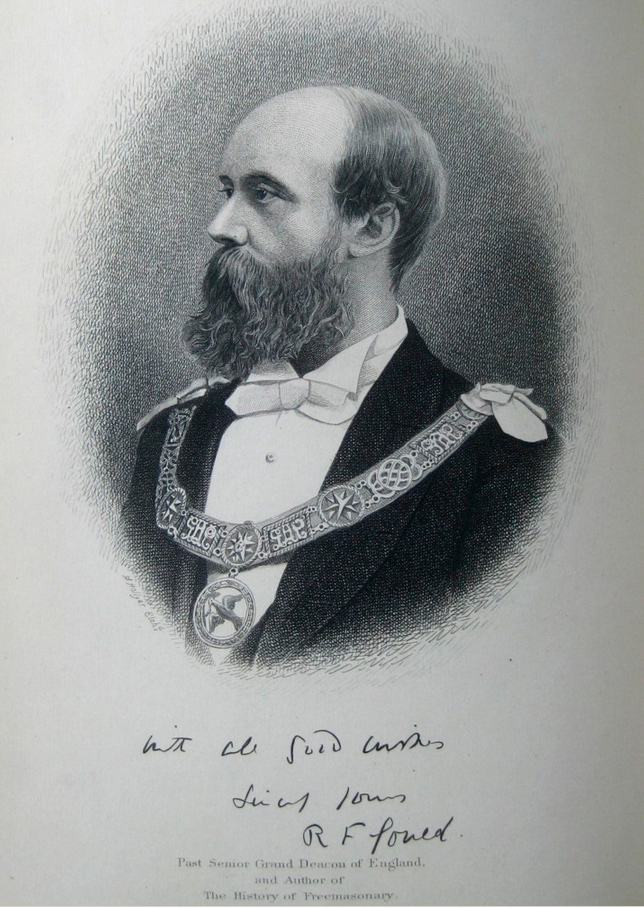
Robert Freke Gould as Senior Grand Deacon of UGLE;from the History of Freemasonry (1885)

Robert Freke Gould (10 November 1836 – 26 March 1915) was a soldier, barrister and prominent Freemason and Masonic historian. He wrote a History of Freemasonry (6 vols.) (London: Thomas C. Jack, 1883–1887), which remains a standard reference work on the subject.

== Early life and career ==
Gould was the son of the Rev. Robert Freke Gould, Rector of Stoke Pero in Somerset and a brother of the Countess of Strafford. The younger brother of Thomas Wentworth Gould, Robert Freke Gould was born in Ilfracombe in Devon and joined the British Army aged 18 in 1855 as an ensign in the 86th (Royal County Down) Regiment of Foot, then as a lieutenant in the 31st (Huntingdonshire) Regiment of Foot. He served in Gibraltar, Malta, the Cape of Good Hope, India and China. He commanded a company during the Second Opium War of 1860 and served on the Staff of General Staveley during the Taiping Rebellion of 1862.

Gould became a Freemason in 1855 when he was initiated at Ramsgate in the Royal Navy Lodge, No. 429, and was Master of the Inhabitants Lodge at Gibraltar in 1863, and also of the Meridian Lodge, No. 743, a Military Lodge attached to his regiment, devoting himself increasingly to Masonic and military literature from 1858 onwards. On 29 July 1869 he married Louisa Maria Gough, the daughter of George Gough. Gould was made Master of the Moira Lodge in 1874 and was appointed Senior Grand Deacon of the United Grand Lodge of England in 1880. He was a Member of the Board of General Purposes (1876–83) and of the Colonial Board (1876–79). In 1877, he gave up his Law career and devoted his life to writing and research.

== Quatuor Coronati Lodge ==
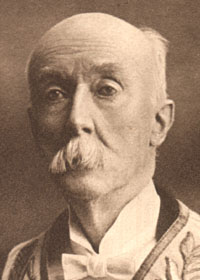
R.F. Gould in 1913

Along with Charles Warren, William Harry Rylands, The Revd Adolphus Frederick Alexander Woodford, Walter Besant, John Paul Rylands, Major Sisson Cooper Pratt, William James Hughan and George William Speth he was one of the founders of Quatuor Coronati Lodge in 1886. Dissatisfied with the way the history of Freemasonry had been expounded in the past they founded the lodge, obtaining a warrant in 1884. Due to the absence of the first Master Sir Charles Warren on a diplomatic mission in Southern Africa, the lodge was not formally inaugurated until two years later. They insisted on using an evidence-based approach to the study of Masonic history. As such, their approach was new and unusual, and they intended that the results should "replace the imaginative writings of earlier authors on the history of Freemasonry." This began what is now called the "authentic school" of Masonic research. Gould was the lodge's second Master.

== Later years ==
In December 1913 Gould was made a Past Grand Warden in honour of the Centenary of the Union of the Grand Lodges of England.

Gould died at his home at Kingsfield Green in Woking in Surrey aged 78. On his death he was buried in the nearby Brookwood Cemetery. He left a widow, Louisa Maria Gould who on her death in 1929 aged 79 was buried with him.

== Partial bibliography ==
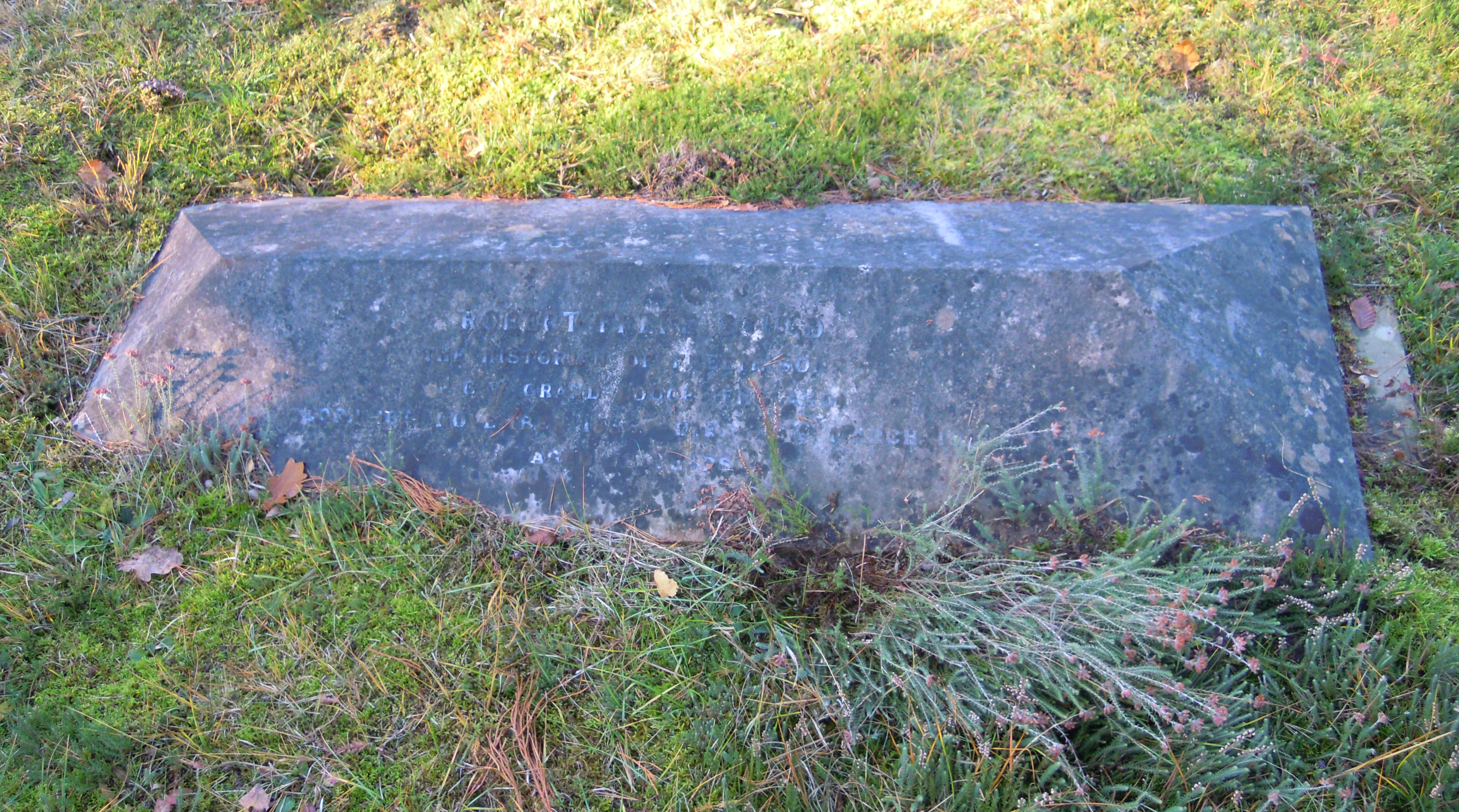
Gould's grave in Brookwood Cemetery

- The Four Old Lodges: Founders of Modern Freemasonry and Their Descendants, Spencer's Masonic Depot, London (1879)
- The Atholl Lodge, Spencer's Masonic Depot, London (1879
- The Military Lodges: The Apron and the Sword, or Freemasonry Under Arms, Gale & Polden (1899)
- History of Freemasonry: Its Antiquities, Symbols, Constitutions, Customs, Etc, Jack (London), (1883–7)
  - Volume I
  - Volume II
  - Volume III on archive.org
- Concise History of Freemasonry Gale & Polden (1903)
