= Coat of arms of Victoria, British Columbia =

Heraldic emblem of the city

The coat of arms of the city of Victoria, British Columbia
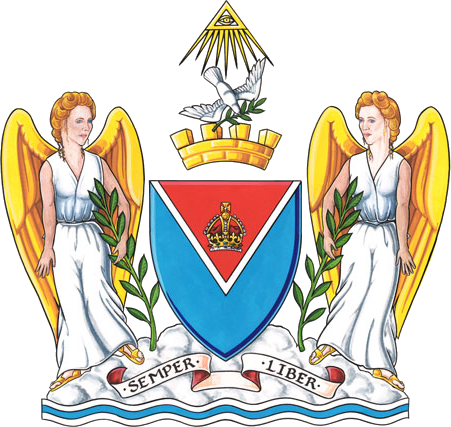
- Armiger: Marianne Alto, Mayor of Victoria
- Adopted: 1962
- Crest: Descending upon a mural crown Or a dove wings expanded in the beak a sprig of olive proper, the whole ensigned of an eye within a triangle the base eradiated downwards Or
- Shield: Azure on a pile Argent another Gules charged with the Royal Crown proper.
- Supporters: On either side an angel proper vested Argent winged Or supporting by the interior hand a branch of laurel Vert
- Compartment: Upon a compartment of clouds proper the base environed of a riband Azure and Argent.
- Motto: Semper Liber, Latin for "always free."
- Other elements: The mantling, gules doubled or.

The coat of arms of the city of Victoria was granted in 1962, and then subsequently registered with the Canadian Heraldic Authority in 2005. While the city employs a logo for common use, the arms are reserved for legal documents and for more historical or traditional purposes and events.

== History ==
The City of Victoria coat of arms dates to 1962, the centennial year of the city's incorporation. Based on the municipal seal and designed by Alan Beddoe, the coat of arms was initially granted by the heralds of the College of Arms in London, as Canada fell under the purview of the English heralds at that time, and was later registered with the Canadian Heraldic Authority in 2005. The design of the shield consists of two piles, one atop the other, that gives the appearance of a white "V" separating the shield into red and blue segments, creating a cypher for the city's namesake and a representation of the peninsula where the city is located and juts into the blue sea. A Royal Crown is placed on the red pile as another allusion to Queen Victoria, for whom the city is named.

There is no torse or mantling mentioned in the Canadian registry, yet mantling is depicted in the London grant as red and gold. A mural crown, a common symbol found in municipal arms, is mentioned in the blazon of the crest, which shows a dove descending from and about the rays of the Eye of Providence, emblems of peace and bounty.

Two winged figures, said to personify Colony and Civilization, support the arms, standing upon a compartment of clouds and wavy bars of white and blue, a heraldic depiction of water.

== Logo ==
The mayor and city council adopted a logo that is referred to as the "V Banner" in 2000, later trademarking it in 2001, in an effort to create "a clear, contemporary and lasting image." It consists of a wavy elongated triangular shape in a blue colour and the type "The City of Victoria". The logo is used on all municipal communications and other common-day use, and may be used by local businesses and groups with permission, reserving the coat of arms strictly for the mayor's protocol, ceremonial events and legal purposes.

== See also ==
- Canadian heraldry
- Flag of Victoria, British Columbia
- Victoria, British Columbia
