= Flag of Victoria, British Columbia =

Canadian municipal flag

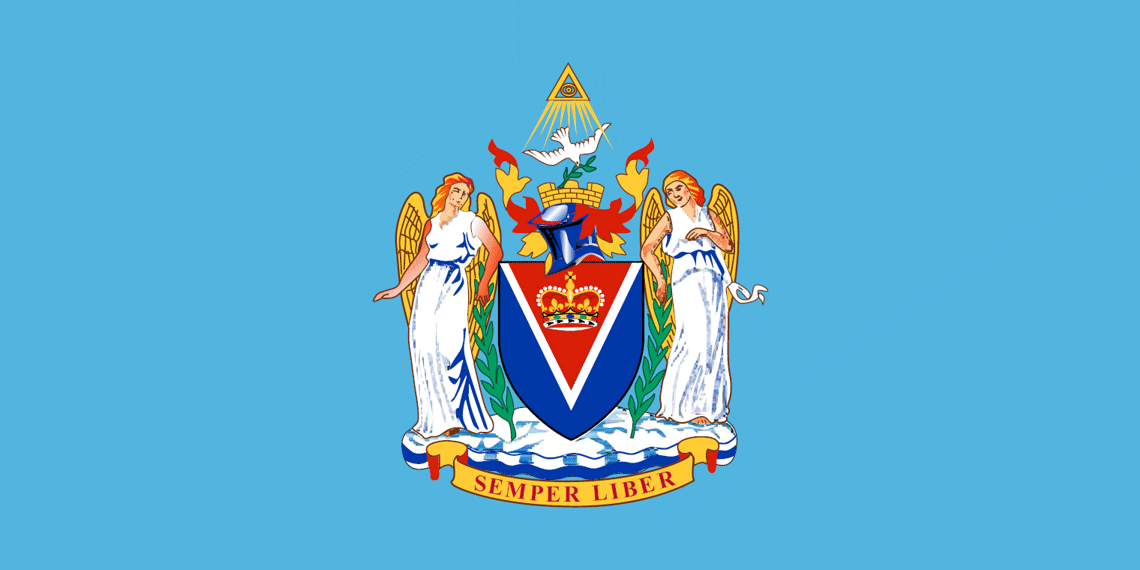
- Adopted: 1966

The flag of Victoria, British Columbia, is light blue with the city's coat of arms in the centre. The flag was adopted in 1966 by the city council.

An alternate flag is sometimes seen, which consists of the city's official wordmark on a white field.

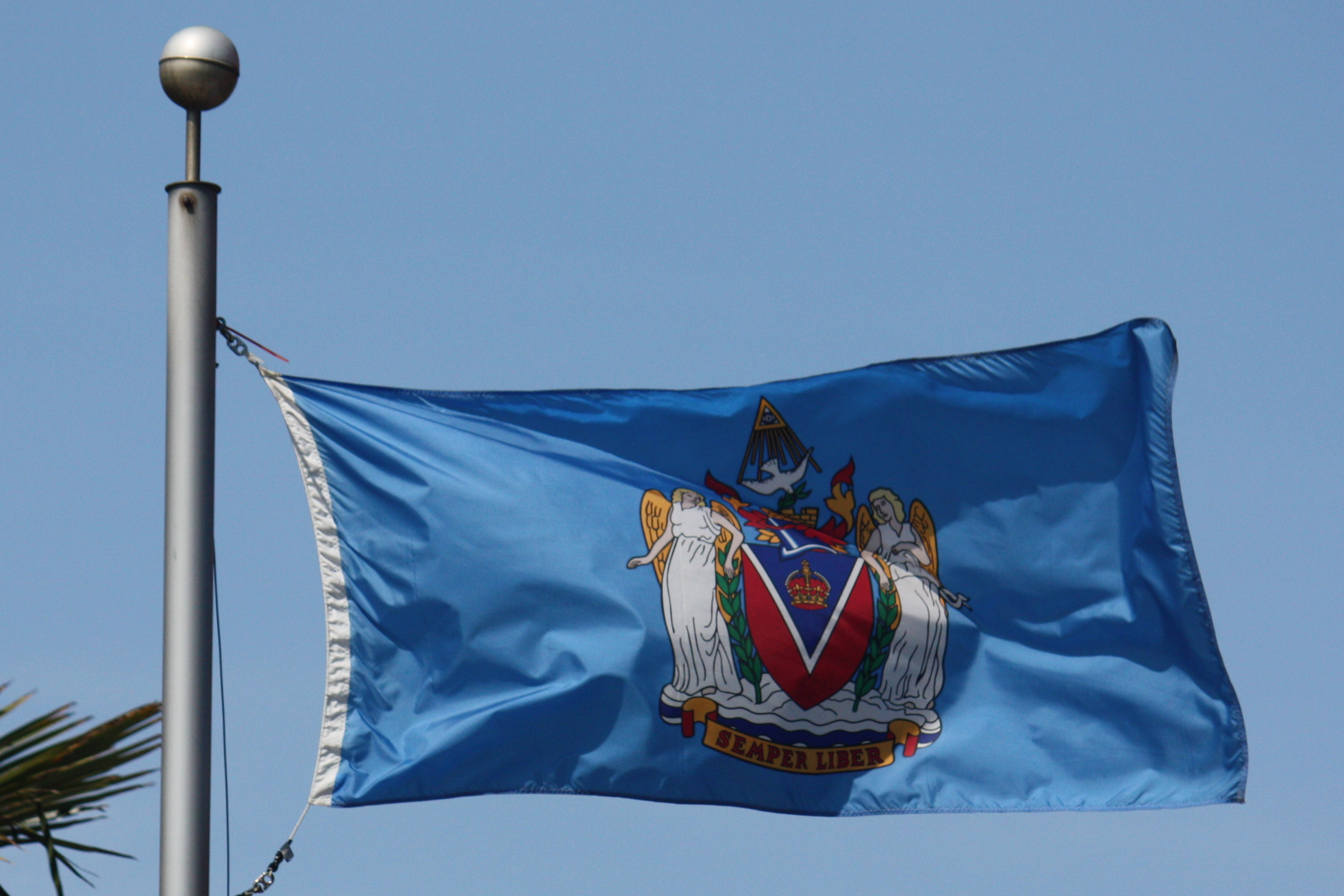
The flag flying outside Victoria's City Hall. This example incorrectly reverses the red and the blue in the shield of the coat of arms.

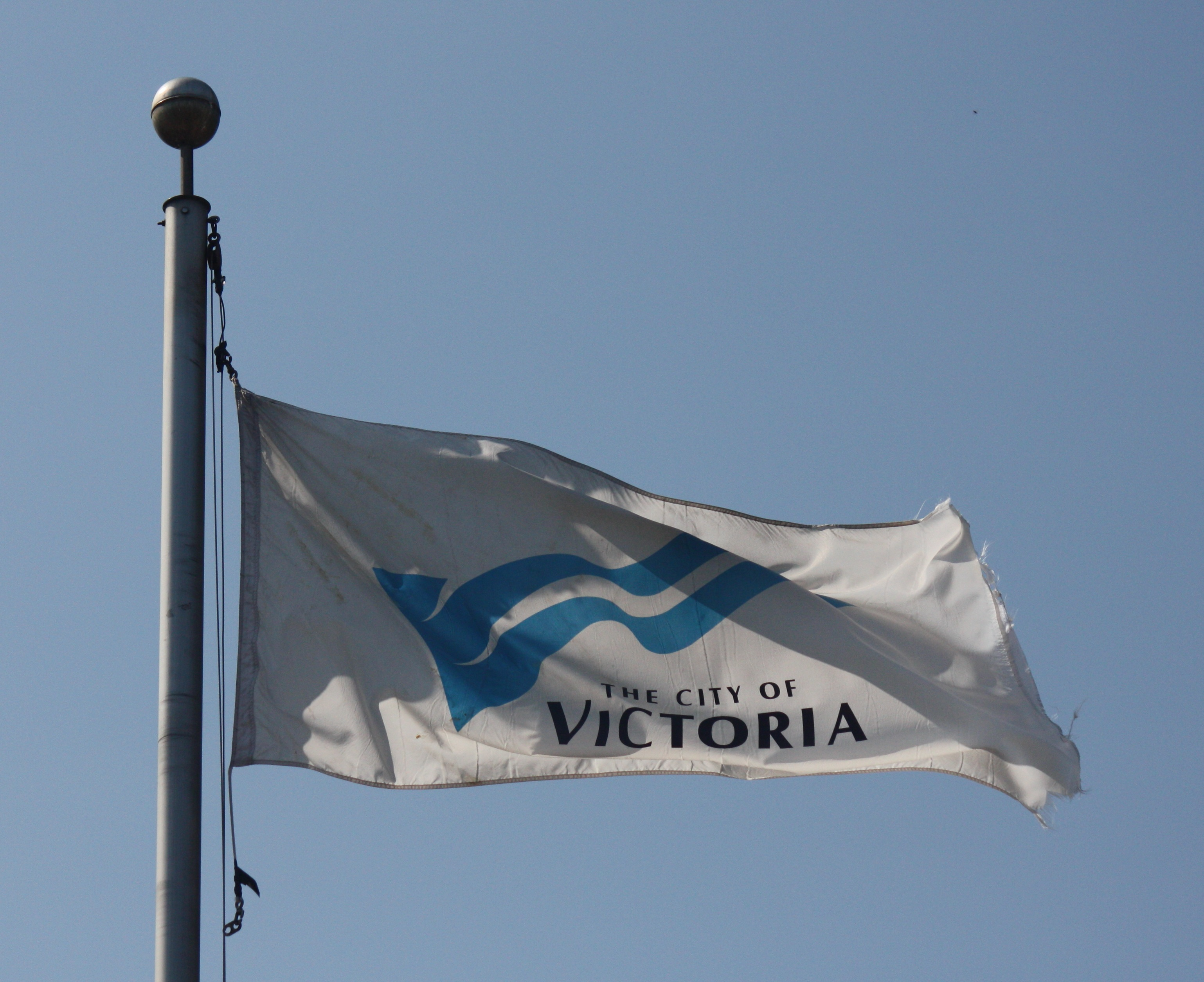
The alternate flag flying in Victoria's Centennial Park
