= Masonic lodge =

Basic organisational unit of Freemasonry

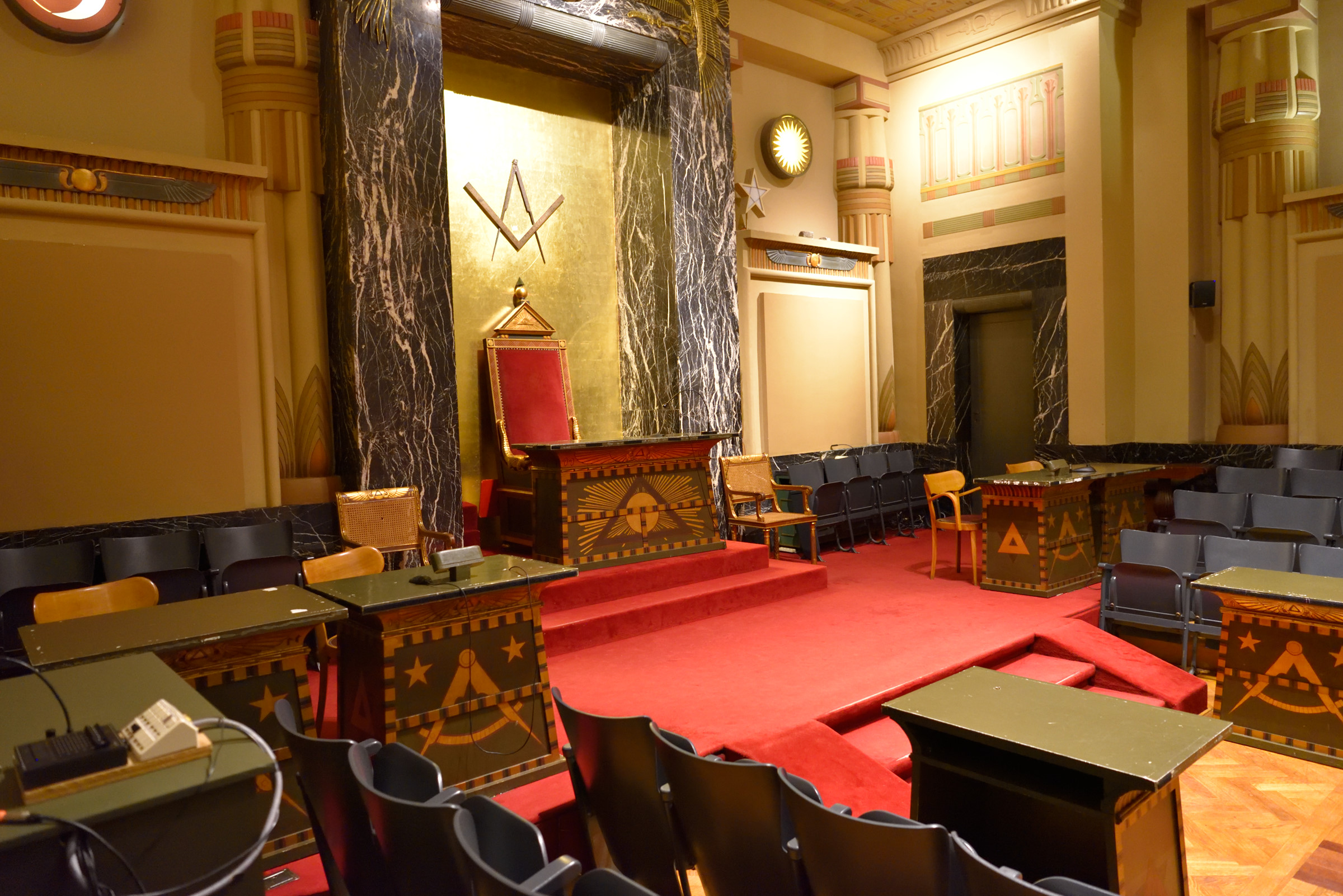
Masonic lodge in the City of Brussels, Belgium

A Masonic lodge (also called Freemasons' lodge, or private lodge or constituent lodge) is the basic organisational unit of Freemasonry. It is also a commonly used term for a building where Freemasons meet and hold their meetings. Every new lodge must be warranted or chartered by a Grand Lodge, but is subject to its direction only by enforcing the published constitution of the jurisdiction. By exception, the three surviving lodges that formed the world's first known grand lodge in London (now merged into the United Grand Lodge of England) have the unique privilege to operate as time immemorial, i.e., without such warrant; only one other lodge operates without a warrant – the Grand Stewards' Lodge in London, although it is not entitled to the "time immemorial" status.

A Freemason is generally entitled to visit any lodge in any jurisdiction (i.e., under any Grand Lodge) in amity (recognition of mutual status) with his own Grand Lodge. In some jurisdictions, this privilege is restricted to Master Masons (that is, Freemasons who have attained the Order's third degree). He is first usually required to check, and certify, the regularity of the relationship of the Lodge – and be able to satisfy that Lodge of his legality of membership. Freemasons gather together as a Lodge to confer (also known by the term "work") the three basic Degrees of Entered Apprentice, Fellowcraft, and Master Mason.

== Masonic premises ==
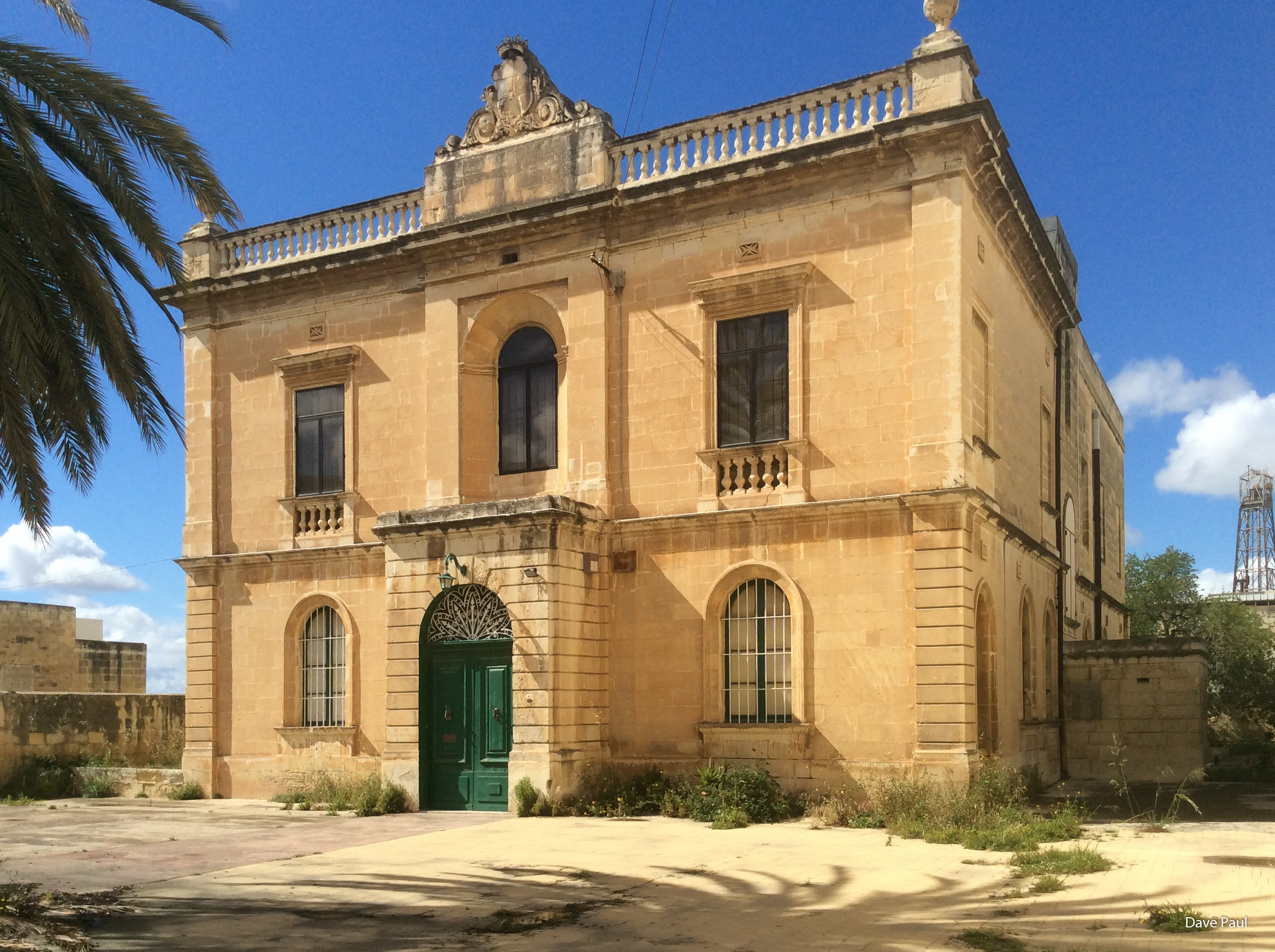
Villa Blye in Paola, Malta, is a Masonic Temple where lodges of British and Irish Freemasons meet

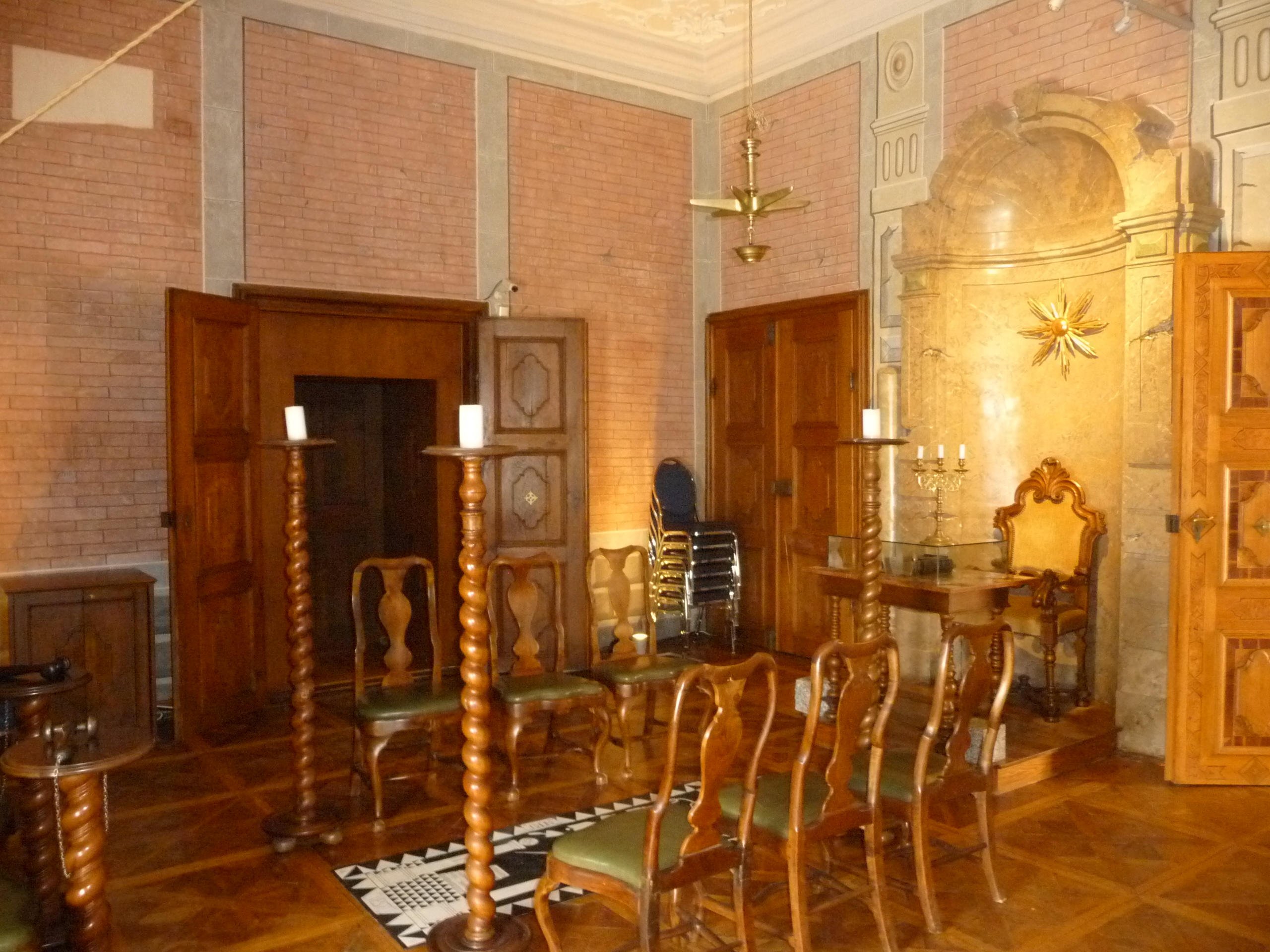
Masonic lodge room in the Austrian Museum of Freemasonry, Schloss Rosenau, Waldviertel, Austria

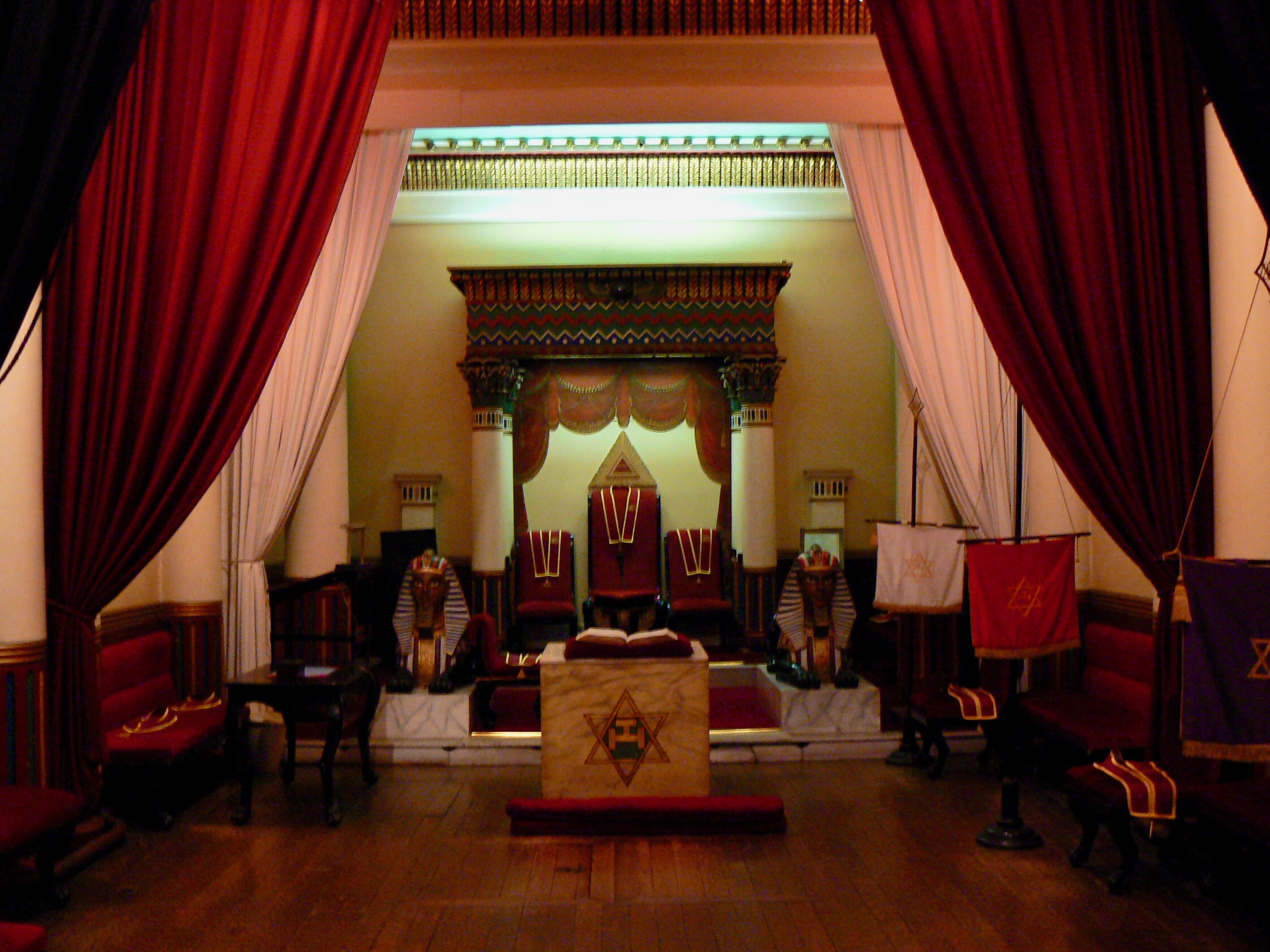
Masonic lodge room in Dublin, Ireland

Freemasons meet as a lodge, not in a lodge. In this context, the word "lodge" refers to a local chapter of Freemasons, meeting as a body. However, the term is often misused to refer to the buildings or rooms that Masons meet in. Masonic premises are also sometimes referred to as Temples ("of Philosophy and the Arts"). In many countries Masonic centre or Masonic hall has now replaced these terms to avoid arousing prejudice and suspicion, or confusion with a religious building. Several different lodges, or other Masonic organizations, often use the same premises at different times.

== Types ==
=== Blue lodge ===
Blue lodges, craft lodges or ancient craft lodges are those that work the first three Masonic degrees (Entered Apprentice, Fellowcraft, and Master Mason) rather than the appendant Masonic orders such as York Rite and Scottish Rite. The term "craft lodge" is used in Great Britain. The Blue lodge is said to refer to the traditional colour of regalia in lodges derived from English or Irish Freemasonry. Although the term was originally frowned upon, it has gained widespread and mainstream usage in America in recent times.

=== Research lodge ===
Research lodges have the purpose of furthering Masonic scholarship. Quatuor Coronati Lodge, in London, is an example of a research lodge; it has a strictly limited membership and receives visitors and papers from all over the world. Many jurisdictions have well-established research lodges, which usually meet less frequently than blue lodges and do not confer degrees.

=== Lodge of Instruction ===
In Great Britain, a lodge of instruction (LOI) may be associated with a Lodge, but is not constituted separately. The lodge of instruction provides the officers and those who wish to become officers an opportunity to rehearse ritual under the guidance of an experienced brother; there may also be lectures around the ritual and the symbolism in the lodge within a Lodge of Instruction, in order to develop the knowledge and understanding of the membership.

In some jurisdictions in the United States, the lodge of instruction serves as a warranted lodge for candidate instruction in other aspects of Freemasonry besides ritual rehearsal, as well as hosting a speaker on topics both Masonic and non-Masonic.

=== Mother lodge ===
In Great Britain, the term mother lodge is used to identify the particular Lodge where the individual was first "made a Mason" (i.e. received his Entered Apprentice degree). 'Mother lodge' may also refer to a lodge that sponsors the creation of a new lodge, the daughter lodge, to be warranted under the jurisdiction of the same grand lodge; specific procedures pertaining to this vary throughout history and in different jurisdictions. Lodge Mother Kilwinning No 0 in the Grand Lodge of Scotland is known as the Mother Lodge of Scotland, having been referred to in the Schaw Statutes of 1598 and 1599, and having itself warranted other lodges at a time when it did not subscribe to a grand lodge.

=== Virtual lodge ===
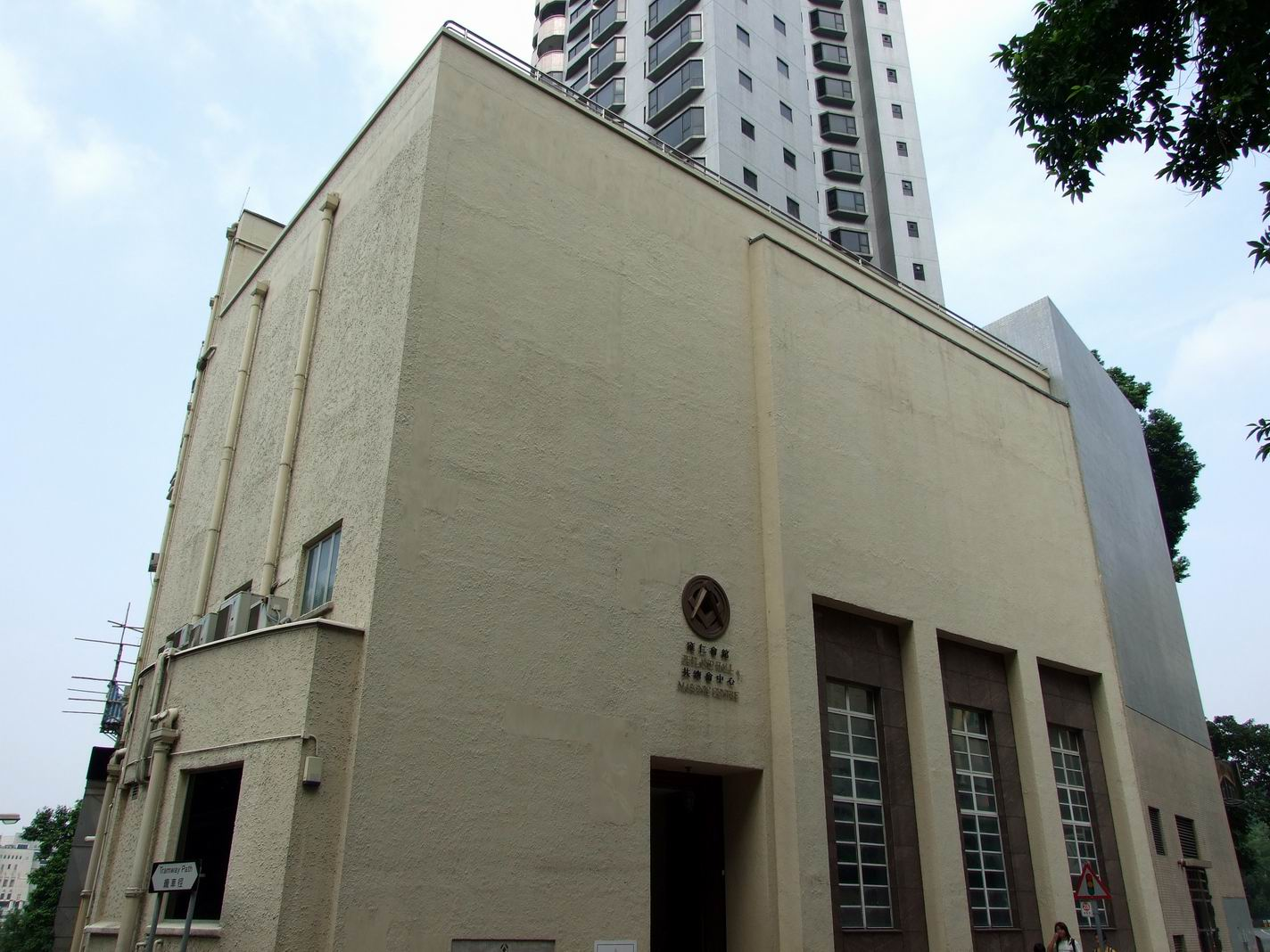
Zetland Hall, a Masonic lodge in Hong Kong

The 21st century has seen the rise of internet virtual lodges that meet online rather than in person. Examples are the Internet Lodge No. 9659, Lodge Ireland, and Castle Island Virtual Lodge No. 190. The ability to hold remote lodge meetings allows those who are distant to continue to attend, whether they are military servicemen serving overseas or they inhabit a sparsely populated region. Virtual lodges were held often during the COVID-19 pandemic, though most lodges have resumed regular in-person meetings as of 2024.

== Organization ==
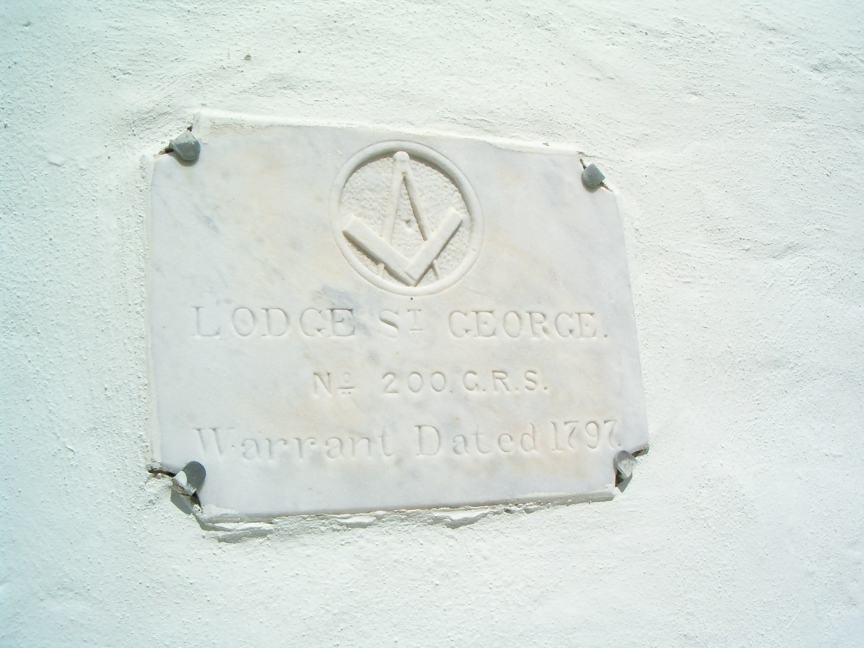
Plaque of Lodge St. George, the 1797 Masonic lodge which has been housed in Bermuda's former State House since 1815

Lodges are governed by national, state or provincial authorities, usually called Grand Lodges or Grand Orients, whose published constitutions define the structure of freemasonry under their authority, and which appoint Grand Officers from their senior masons. Provincial Grand Lodges (which in England generally correspond to historic counties) exercise an intermediate authority, and also appoint Provincial Grand Officers.

Different grand lodges and their regions show subtleties of tradition and variation in the degrees and practice; for example under the Grand Lodge of Scotland, the Mark Degree (which is unrecognised by the United Grand Lodge of England, but has a separate Mark Grand Lodge) is integrated into "The Craft" as a completion of the second degree. In any case, Grand Lodges have limited jurisdiction over their member Lodges, and where there is no prescribed ritual Lodges may thus have considerable freedom of practice. Despite these minor differences, fraternal relations exist between Lodges of corresponding degrees under different Grand Lodges.

== Membership ==
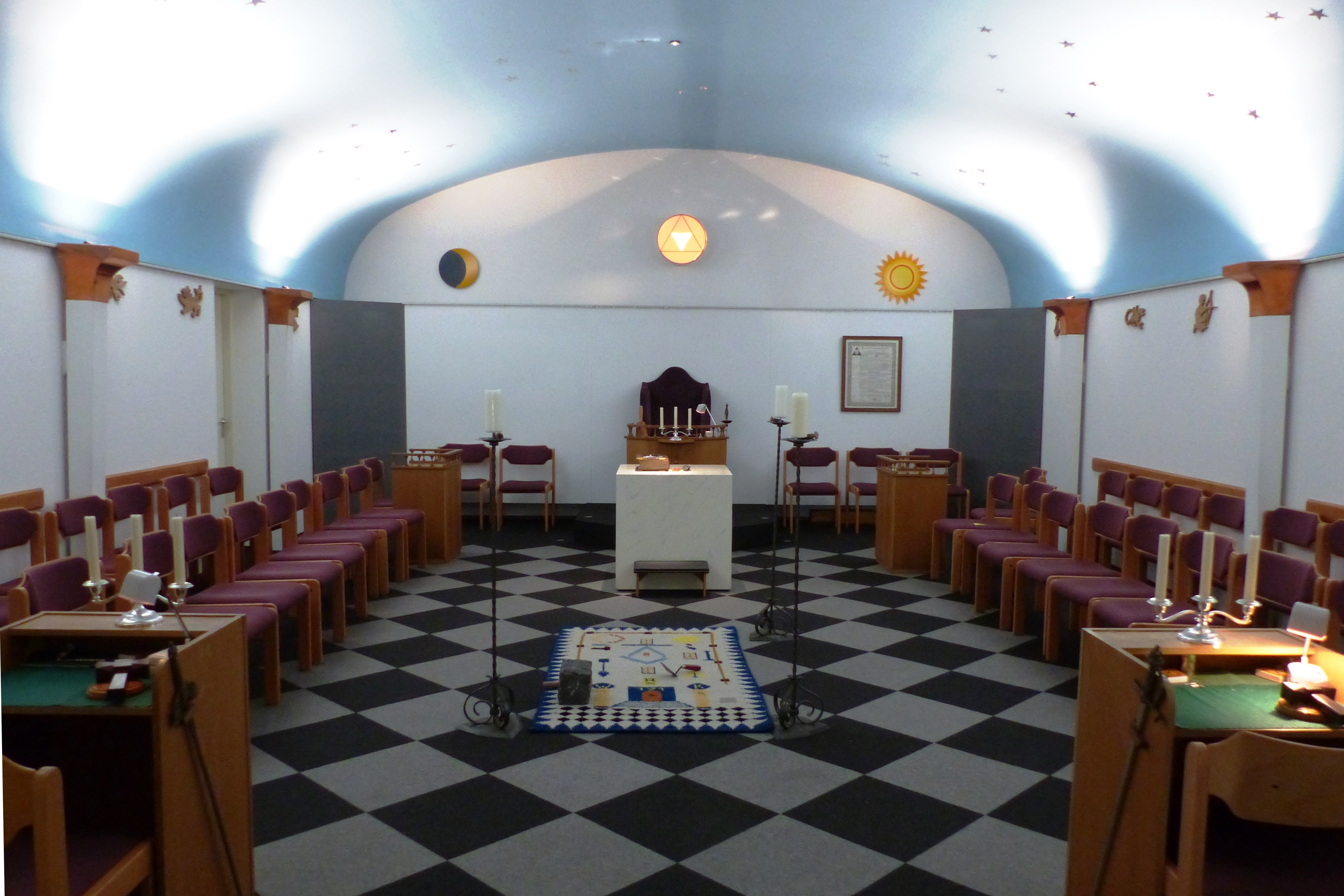
Masonic lodge room in Winterswijk, Netherlands

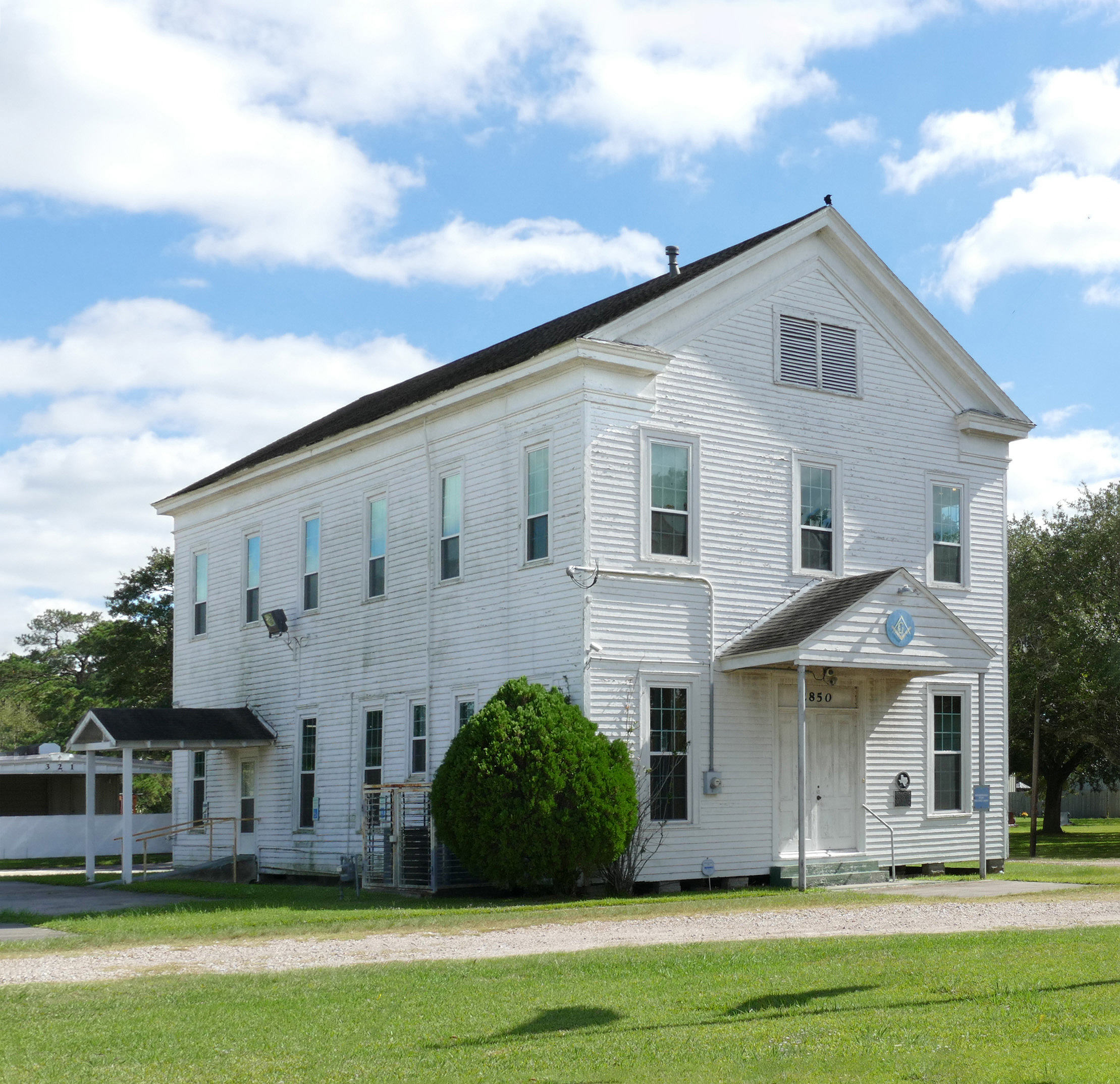
Cedar Bayou Masonic Lodge No. 321, A. F. & A. M. in Baytown, Texas

Membership requirements in Freemasonry have evolved over time and vary depending on the jurisdiction and the specific Masonic style or branch. However, there are certain common requirements that have remained relatively consistent throughout the history of the fraternity.

=== Regular Freemasonry ===
In Regular Freemasonry, which follows the Anglo-American style, a candidate for initiation must generally meet the following criteria:

- Be a man
- Come of his own free will, either by his own initiative or by invitation in some jurisdictions
- Believe in a Supreme Being, although any specific religion is not specified and not required
- Be of good morals, reputation, and financially capable of supporting himself and his family
- Be at least 21 years old (with some jurisdictions allowing candidates as young as 18 or as old as 25)
- Live within the jurisdiction of the lodge (a requirement in some U.S. Grand Lodges and United Grand Lodge of England)
- Before petitioning, pass an initial qualification interview. Most of the time, this is done with the Master of the Lodge or another elected officer. In some areas of the world, this may also include a legal background check
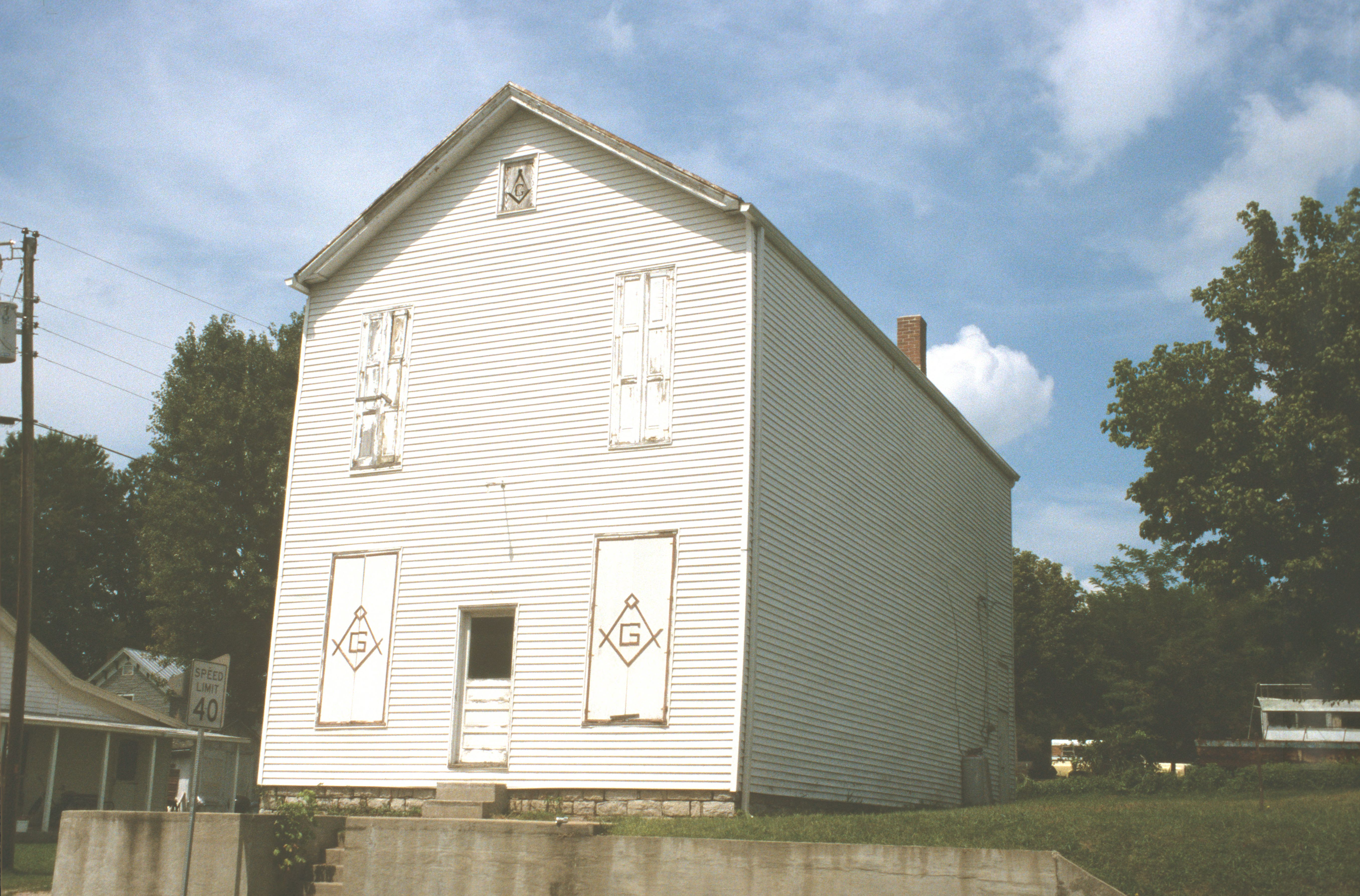
- Florence Masonic Lodge in Florence, Indiana
  After petitioning, pass a number of separate interviews and inquiries conducted by the lodge's Investigation Committee, which may take up to two years
- Be of "sound mind and body" (not a universal requirement)
- Be a "Free Man," meaning not bound by servitude or slavery
- Receive a favorable vote from the lodge members

=== Continental Freemasonry ===
In Continental Freemasonry, which is prevalent in Europe and Latin America, the requirements may differ slightly and can take from one to three years:

- Minimum age of 18 in most cases
- Good moral character
- Free man, not bound by obligations that would conflict with Masonic duties
- Recommendation or background check
- Pass initial interview with the Master of the Lodge.
- Being invited by a member (sometimes called a "godfather").

=== Prince Hall Freemasonry ===
Prince Hall Freemasonry, which predominantly serves African American communities, generally follows similar requirements to Regular Freemasonry, with a few additional criteria:

- Be a man 18 years of age or older
- Believe in a Supreme Being regardless of religion
- Believe in the immortality of the soul
- Possess a desire to help others through community service and universal benevolence
- African descent (in somecases)
- Recommended by existing members
- Pass a background check

=== Co-Freemasonry and Women's Freemasonry ===
Co-Freemasonry and Women's Freemasonry admit both men and women, or women only, respectively. Their requirements are similar to Regular and Continental Freemasonry, with some variations:

- Be at least 18 years old.
- Be "Free" (free from dogmatic principles; open to growing and learning; have time to participate regularly; have the ability to pay annual dues).
- Be "of Good Report" (law abiding; striving toward self-improvement and service to humanity; accepting and tolerant).
- Belief in a Supreme Being or higher power (in some cases)
- Recommendation from existing members may be required (Women's Freemasonry)

=== History and evolution of requirements ===
The membership requirements in Freemasonry have evolved over time, reflecting changes in societal norms and the fraternity's internal guidelines. Some notable developments include:

In the early days of speculative Freemasonry (18th century), the requirement of being a "Free Man" may have stemmed from the refusal of operative masons to share their secrets with slaves, who could be ordered to divulge them. The "Free Man" requirement may have also been related to the necessity of having a license to trade and employ others, making the candidate a free man of the city or borough where the lodge was located. The minimum age requirement has varied over time and across jurisdictions, with some allowing candidates as young as 18 and others setting the limit at 25. The belief in a Supreme Being has been a consistent requirement, although the specific religious affiliation has not been prescribed, reflecting Freemasonry's openness to men of various faiths.

=== Landmarks and reasons behind requirements ===
The membership requirements in Freemasonry are guided by the fraternity's Landmarks, which are the fundamental principles that define the essence of the Craft. Some of the Landmarks related to membership include:

- The belief in a Supreme Being
- The necessity of being a free man and of mature age
- The prohibition of women as members (in Regular Freemasonry)

These Landmarks and requirements serve several purposes:

Ensuring that candidates share common values and are committed to personal growth and moral character Maintaining the integrity and harmony of the lodge by admitting members who are compatible with Masonic principles Preserving the traditions and symbolic teachings of the fraternity Fostering a sense of brotherhood and trust among members

=== Progression through degrees ===
Once a candidate is elected and initiated into a lodge, he progresses through the three degrees of Freemasonry: Entered Apprentice, Fellowcraft, and Master Mason. The Lodge decides whether to confer each degree based on the candidate's proficiency and readiness.

In Regular Freemasonry under the United Grand Lodge of England (UGLE), a Master Mason receives a Grand Lodge certificate, which may be required for visiting other lodges. A Master Mason is considered a full, lifetime member of the lodge where he received his degrees, with the right to demit (resign) if he is in good standing and has paid his dues.

After demitting, a Mason is still regarded as a member in absentia and may rejoin through a new application. However, he and his family have no rights, privileges, or claims on Freemasonry during his absence. Some Masonic scholars, such as Albert Mackey, argue that leaving the lodge does not exempt a Mason from his obligations or the moral conduct expected by the fraternity.

A Master Mason may be expelled from his lodge and Freemasonry if convicted of serious violations of civil or Masonic law. Expulsion from all of Freemasonry can only be implemented by a Grand Lodge, while individual lodges may expel members from their specific lodges.

=== Affiliation and plural membership ===
A Master Mason in good standing may join another regular lodge without taking the degrees again, although he may be expected to serve in office. If a Master Mason is dropped from the rolls for non-payment of dues, he may be reinstated in good standing by paying his current and back dues, with some jurisdictions requiring a ballot for re-admission. Many Grand Lodges allow Master Masons to be "plural affiliates," or members of more than one lodge simultaneously. However, some jurisdictions prohibit plural affiliates from serving as elected officers in multiple lodges at the same time.

The rules for affiliation and plural membership differ for Freemasons of the Entered Apprentice and Fellowcraft degrees. Some Grand Lodges do not allow Entered Apprentices or Fellowcrafts to demit but may permit them to join another lodge to earn the Master Mason degree with the consent of their original lodge.

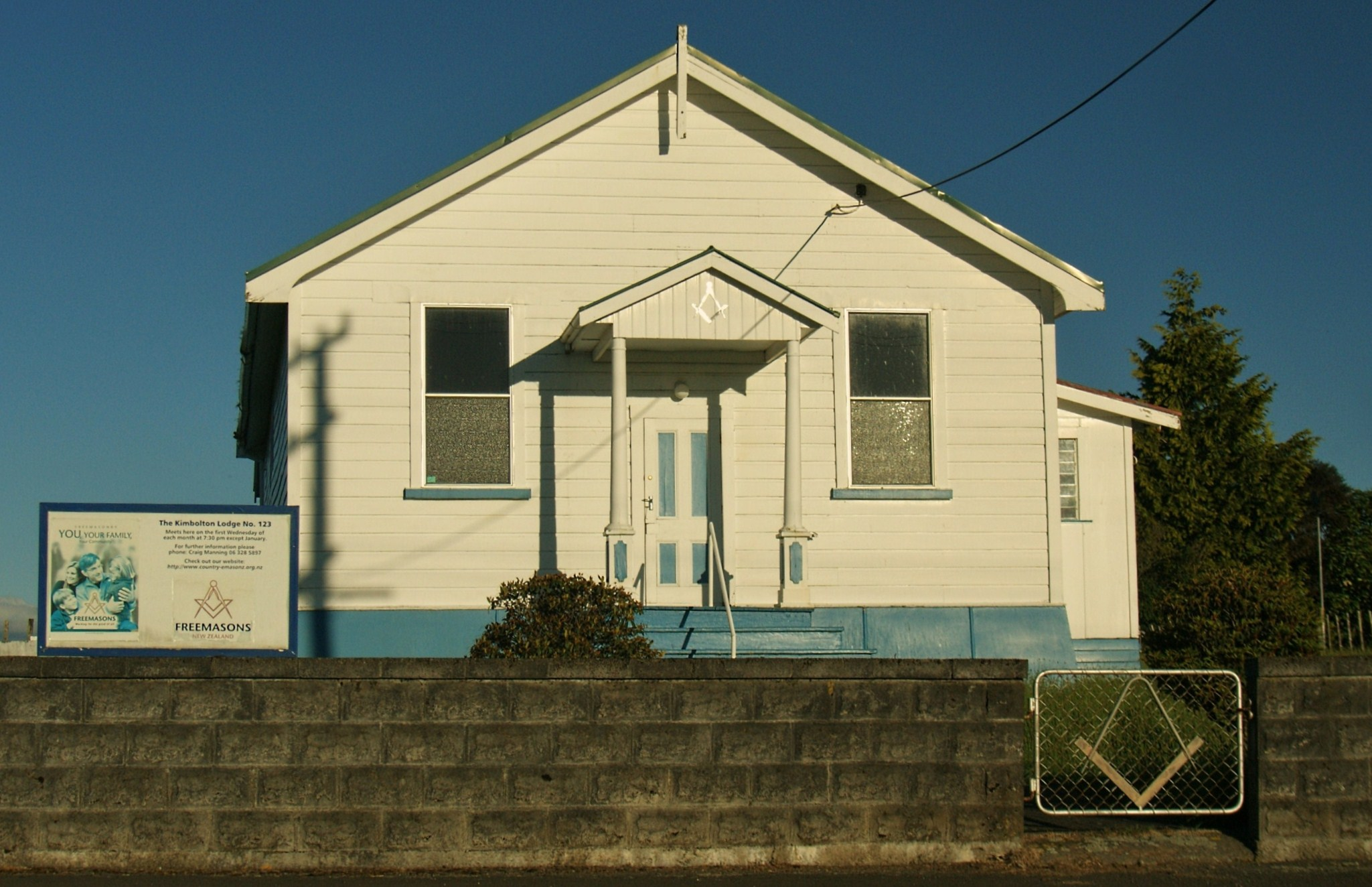
Masonic Lodge No. 123 in Kimbolton, New Zealand

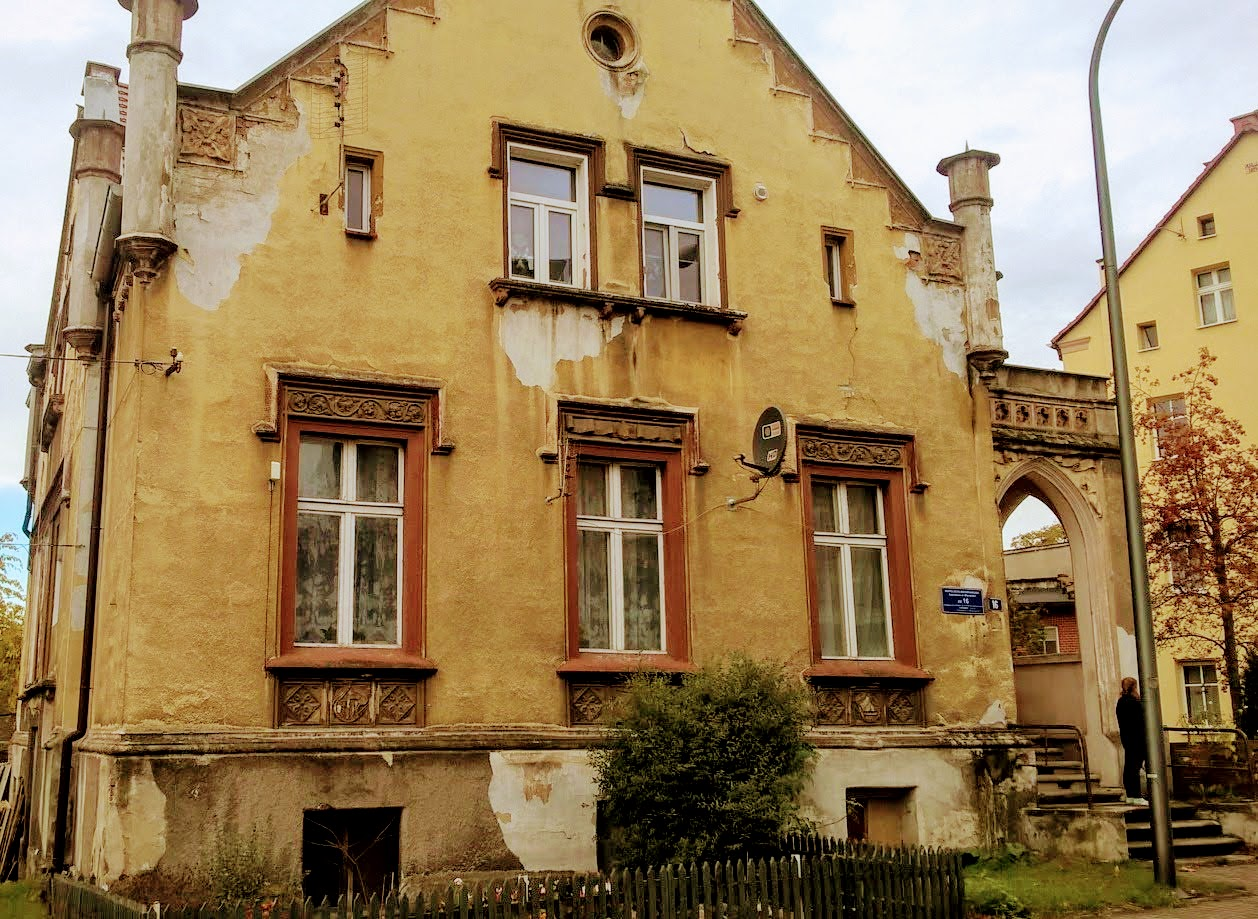
Former house of the Masonic lodge in Szprotawa, Poland

The membership requirements, progression through degrees, and affiliation rules in Freemasonry are designed to ensure the integrity, harmony, and continuity of the fraternity while allowing for personal growth and brotherhood among its members. These guidelines have evolved over time, reflecting the changing needs and values of the Craft and society at large.

== Officers ==
The names, roles and numbers of Lodge officers vary widely from jurisdiction to jurisdiction. In most cases, there is an equivalent office in the Grand Lodge of the given jurisdiction, with the addition of the prefix 'Grand' to the title in question.

There are certain 'progressive' offices through which members move by a process of effective promotion, but also other more permanent offices, usually held by experienced members.

== See also ==
- Grand Lodge
- Masonic music
- Masonic ritual and symbolism
- Research lodge

== Notes ==
1. ...the premier Grand Lodge was established on 24 June 1717, St John's Day, when a feast was held at the Goose and Gridiron Ale House in St Paul's Churchyard. The four Lodges involved met at the Goose and Gridiron, the Crown Ale House in Parkers Lane (near the present building in Great Queen Street), The Apple Tree Tavern in Charles Street, Covent Garden and the Runner and Grapes Tavern in Channel Row, Westminster. Three still survive and are now known as Lodge of Antiquity No 2, Fortitude and Old Cumberland Lodge No 12 (originally No 3) and Royal Somerset House and Inverness Lodge No IV. These are known as "time immemorial lodges" the only lodges within the English constitution with this distinction. They, together with Grand Stewards' Lodge, have the ability to operate without a warrant.
