= Thomas Smith Webb =

American writer (1771–1819)

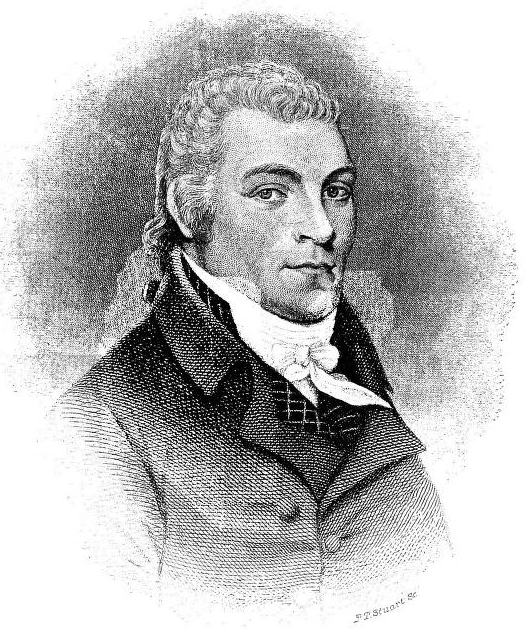
- Thomas Smith Webb
- Born: October 30, 1771; Boston, Massachusetts
- Died: July 6, 1819 (aged 47); Cleveland, Ohio
- Occupations: Writer, Freemason
- Relatives: Samuel and Margaret (Smith) Webb (parents)
- Writing career
- Notable work: Freemason’s Monitor or Illustrations of Masonry

Thomas Smith Webb (October 30, 1771 – July 6, 1819) was the author of Freemason’s Monitor or Illustrations of Masonry, a book which had a significant impact on the development of Masonic Ritual in America, and especially that of the York Rite. Webb has been called the "Founding Father of the York or American Rite" for his efforts to promote those Masonic bodies.

== Biography ==
Webb was born in Boston, Massachusetts. He was the son of Samuel and Margaret (Smith) Webb, who had emigrated to America from England shortly before Thomas' birth. At the age of sixteen he was apprenticed to a printer in Boston, and he afterward moved to Keene, New Hampshire, where he worked for some time at his trade. Here the three degrees of ancient craft Masonry were conferred upon him by Rising Sun Lodge. In 1793, he moved to Albany, New York. In 1797, he was the founding Master of Temple Lodge, No. 14, In Albany (now Ancient Temple Lodge No. 14) where both, regular Masonic meetings and Royal Arch meetings were held. Smith Webb established a paper staining factory and on 14 September 1797, as appears from the copyright, he published The Freemason's Monitor, or Illustrations of Masonry. This small volume, which is now very rare, consisted of two parts, the second part containing an account of the "Ineffable Degrees of Masonry" together with several Masonic songs by the author. The publication of this work was followed by successively enlarged and improved editions in 1802, 1805, 1808, 1812, 1816, 1818, and by numerous editions after the author's death.

Thomas Smith Webb presided over a convention of committees in Boston in October, 1797, for the formation of a general Grand Chapter of Royal Arch Masons, and at a meeting in Providence in January, 1799, he presented, as chairman of a committee, a constitution which was adopted. The formation of the Grand Encampment of the United States was the result of his Masonic work. The original draft of the constitution, with all the changes, additions, and interlineations in his own handwriting, is in the archives of St. John's Commandery, Providence, Rhode Island. In 1799 he moved with his family to Providence, where he spent the greater part of his remaining years.

His musical attainments were considerable, and he was the first president of the Psallonian Society, an organization for the improvement of its members in sacred melody. In 1815, having changed his residence to Boston, he instituted, in connection with others, the Handel and Haydn Society, of which he was the first president.

He also served as the first Grand Commander of what is now the Grand Commandery of Knights Templar and the Appendant Orders of Massachusetts and Rhode Island, and Grand Master of the Grand Lodge of Rhode Island in 1813–14.

== Sources ==
- Temple Lodge #14, Albany New York 1797-1802 Minute Book
- Hodapp, Christopher; Freemasons for Dummies, Wiley Publishing, 2005, pp. 43–44.
- Morris, S. Brent; The Complete Idiot's Guide to Freemasonry, Alpha books, 2006, p. 24.
- Dumas Malone, ed. (1932). Dictionary of American biography. Vol. XIX. New York: Charles Scribner's Sons.
