= Mikhail Kheraskov =

Russian poet and playwright

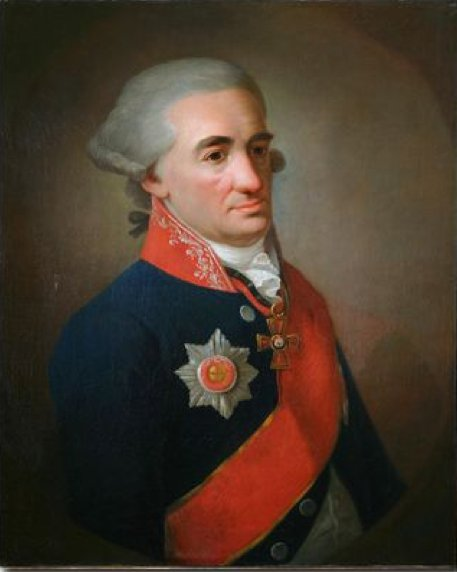
Portrait of Mikhail Kheraskov by K. Gekke, 1800s.

Mikhail Matveyevich Kheraskov (Russian: Михаи́л Матве́евич Хера́сков; 5 November [O.S. 25 October] 1733 – 9 October [O.S. 27 September] 1807) was a Russian poet and playwright. A leading figure of the Russian Enlightenment, Kheraskov was regarded as the most important Russian poet by Catherine the Great and her contemporaries.

Kheraskov's father was a Wallachian boyar who settled in Ukraine. Patronized by his Freemason friends, Mikhail furthered his education abroad and was appointed dean of the Moscow University in 1763 at the age of 30.

In 1771–1779, he wrote the Rossiad (Russian: Россиада, Rossiada), the first Russian epic in the tradition of Homer and Virgil, about Ivan the Terrible's taking of Kazan in 1552. The Rossiad's only rival for the title of the longest poem in the Russian language is Kheraskov's Vladimir Reborn (1785), concerned with the baptism of Kievan Rus.

Somewhat more popular is his oriental tale Bakhariana (1803). Kheraskov also wrote 20 plays but, like the rest of his writings, they have been largely neglected by posterity.

He spent much of his time in Grebnevo, his manorial estate near Moscow. Mikhail Timofeyevich Vysotsky (1791–1837, Russian guitarist-virtuoso and guitar composer) was a godson of Mikhail Kheraskov.

== Biography ==
=== Early life ===
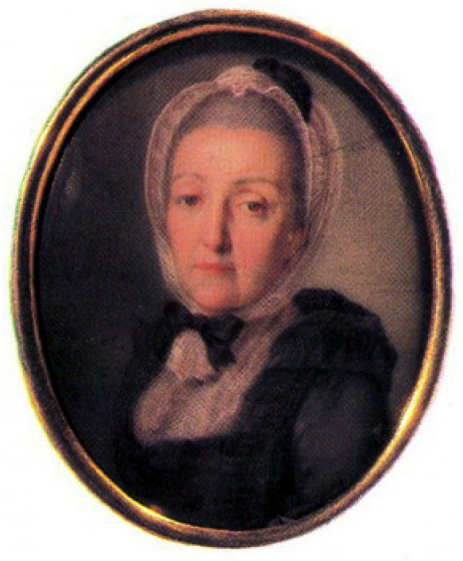
Princess Anna Danilovna Trubetskaya—Kheraskov's mother. A miniature portrait by an unknown artist, painted sometime in the 1760s.

Mikhail Kheraskov was born in 1733 in the city of Pereiaslav. His father, Matei Herescu, was a stolnik (a minor Wallachian nobleman) and a descendant of Wallachian boyars. He was also the brother-in-law of General Toma Cantacuzino (1665-1720), a Wallachian cavalry commander who served under Peter the Great. Herescu and other members of the Wallachian and Moldavian nobility had moved to the Russian Empire and entered the service of Peter following the unsuccessful Pruth River Campaign, a Russian offensive which sought to expel the Ottoman Empire from Moldavia and establish Russian garrisons in Moldavian fortress towns. Matei Herescu changed his name to Matvei Andreevich Kheraskov and received an estate near Pereiaslav in Left-bank Ukraine (along with 5,000 serfs, by some accounts). He attained the rank of major in the newly formed Chevalier Guard Regiment and eventually became commandant of the Pereiaslav fortress. He was married to Anna Danilovna Druckie-Sokolinskie, and died in 1734, leaving Anna to raise their three children, of which Mikhail was the youngest. In November 1735, Anna married Prince Nikita Yurievich Trubetskoy, a seasoned officer who was then serving as the general-krigs-komissar in the Ukrainian fortress town Izium, where Mikhail spent his earliest years. Because of his ancestry and the connections his stepfather afforded him, Kheraskov enjoyed the privileges of the highest ranks of the Russian nobility.

In September 1740, Trubetskoy was appointed Prosecutor General of the Governing Senate and moved to St. Petersburg with his family. In September 1743, he reported to the Office of Heraldry that his biological children and stepchildren were able to "read and write Russian, and are being taught the French and German languages, geography, arithmetic and geometry." In December, Trubetskoy wrote to the Senate of his wish to place his ten-year-old stepson in the First Cadet Corps. The request was granted, and at Mikhail was enrolled on 30 December. Modeled on the "Knight academies" of West European states, Kheraskov received an excellent education in the humanities. In addition to active literary circles, theatrical performances were staged by students with the assistance of figures such as Alexander Sumarokov, who is credited with introducing classical theater to Russia. While some sources suggest that Kheraskov was already writing poetry during this period, other sources indicate that before the age of twenty he had not demonstrated any particular talents. In the Cadet Corps he studied the same subjects that he had studied at home, and judging by surviving documents, his academic performance was assessed as "mediocre". In 1749 he was promoted to corporal. Kheraskov completed his course of studies in 1751, and on 15 September he was commissioned as a podporuchik in the Ingrian Regiment.

=== Moscow University ===
Having served as an officer for about four years, Mikhail Kheraskov entered state service in 1755, and was enrolled in the Collegium of Commerce. However, in early 1756 he transferred to the recently founded Moscow University, where he was appointed collegiate assessor. In some way or another, he would remain affiliated with the university for the rest of his life.

As collegiate assessor, Kheraskov was tasked with the supervision (and surveillance) of university students. In 1756, Kheraskov took on additional responsibilities as head of the university library and director of the university theater. On 24 February 1757, he was admitted to the University Conference (analogous to the modern academic council), and became a trustee of the university printing house. In order to increase the number of publications, Kheraskov contacted the academician Gerhard Friedrich Müller, who in 1754 founded the periodical Monthly Writings Serving Purpose and Enjoyment, the first monthly popular science and literary journal in Russia. Kheraskov became a regular contributor to Monthly Writings, and he and Miller exchanged publications and frequently corresponded. As a form of encouragement, the curator and founder of Moscow University, Ivan Shuvalov, appointed Kheraskov to supervise the Moscow Synodal Printing Office.

Kheraskov's activities were extremely diverse: in 1759 he became a supervisor of the mineralogical cabinet, and in 1761 he was made head director over Russian actors in Moscow. He was also responsible for contracting Italian singers. Kheraskov not only directed, but also played a role in the successful debut of his tragedy, The Venetian Nun, reviews of which appeared even in German journals. In 1761 he was awarded the rank of Court Councillor. In June 1761 he served as acting director of the university because of a leave of absence by the appointed director, Ivan Ivanovich Melissino. Later that year, Kheraskov staged a heroic comedy in verse entitled The Infidel, in which he showcased his religious zeal. This production was the last for the university theater.

Kheraskov also organized and managed a number of publications that were published by the university printing house. This included Useful Entertainment (1760-1762), Free Time (1763), Harmless Exercises (1763), and Good Intentions (1764). Kheraskov's circle included a number of young writers (the majority poets) whose writings were featured in these and other university publications. Among them was Ippolit Fyodorovich Bogdanovich, whom Kheraskov enrolled in the university gymnasium invited to lodge with him. In 1762 he published Collection of the Best Works for the Dissemination of Knowledge and to the Work of Pleasure, or a Mixed Library of Various Physical, Economic, and Even Manufactured and Commercial Things. Professor Johann Gotfried Reichel edited Collection, whose material consisted of translations made by students, including those by the future Russian playwright Denis Ivanovich Fonvizin.

In 1760 Kheraskov married Elizabeth Vasilevna Nerovnaya, who also wrote poetry; their home became a recognized center for literature in Moscow.

=== Career in Moscow and St. Petersburg ===
In January 1762, Kheraskov composed an ode in honor of the newly crowned Emperor Peter III. Six months later, after the Palace Coup of July 1762, he composed one for Catherine the Great. For the rest of his life, on behalf of either himself or Moscow University, Kheraskov would compose poems almost annually dedicated to the empress. He also wrote poems dedicated to Catherine's favorites. A year earlier, in 1761, he published "On Humanity", which he dedicated to Yekaterina Vorontsova-Dashkova. In 1762, he dedicated a collection entitled New Odes to her. At the end of 1762, Kheraskov was appointed to a committee to organize a celebration to mark the anniversary of Catherine's coronation. Along with Fyodor Volkov, a celebrated Russian actor, and Sumarokov, he prepared "Triumphant Minerva", a three-day pageant in the style of the Carnival of Venice that took place in the summer of 1763. Additionally, he wrote "Poems for the Great Masquerade" to mark the occasion.

On 13 June 1763 Mikhail was named Director of Moscow University and promoted to the civil rank of Collegiate Councillor. At that time, the situation at the university was growing tense as a result of a dispute between the curator and Kheraskov. As Reichel wrote to Miller in St. Petersburg:

The new director is at odds with the curator, with whom it appears the Chancellery holds the final word. Scholarship, it seems, is something insignificant.

Over the years, the conflict between the curator (Vasily Adodurov), Kheraskov and the university professors reached a boiling point. In May 1765, Adodurov, while examining the affairs of the university gymnasium, questioned the competency and teaching ability of a German law professor named Philipp Dilthey. Dilthey was known for his heavy drinking, crude language, and frequent absences. Without consulting Kheraskov, Adodurov wrote to Catherine and arranged for his dismissal. Kheraskov insisted that as director, he was in charge of the hiring and dismissal of professors. Dilthey was reinstated a year later. Adding to the rift between Kheraskov and Adodurov were the latter's attempts to establish a new university framework, which called for greater censorship of professors and strict discipline of students.

Another problem the university faced was related to the language of instruction. Almost the entire faculty consisted of Germans who spoke Russian only with difficulty, if at all. Most lectures were delivered in German, French, and especially Latin, the mastery of which the German professors considered the "goal of the university and basis of all the Sciences." One of the Russian professors, Nikolay Popovsky, was even reprimanded in 1758 for delivering lectures in Russian. In May and June 1767, while traveling with Catherine and her court on the Volga River, Kheraskov appealed directly to Catherine, and in 1768, professors were permitted to speak Russian in the classroom. Catherine considered it especially important that jurisprudence should be taught in Russian.

Later in 1767, the Russian edition of the Encyclopédie was issued in three parts, for which Kheraskov had translated three articles, "Magic", "Narration", and "Nature". In 1768, Kheraskov introduced the preliminary censorship of public university speeches and lectures after the speeches of Ivan Andreyevich Tretyakov were deemed to contain "dubious and daring expressions". Tretyakov was a graduate of the University of Glasgow, where, along with fellow Moscow University professor Semyon Efimovich Desnitsky, he had studied directly under Adam Smith. His lectures and books were considered to be largely verbatim transcriptions of Smith's lectures, and thus disseminated ideas of the Scottish Enlightenment.

In February 1770 Kheraskov traveled to St. Petersburg and in that summer was named the vice president of the Collegium of Mining and promoted to the civil rank of State Councillor. Like in Moscow, his residence in the capital became popular among literary circles. From 1772 to 1773 he published the journal Evening, in which the majority of material was published anonymously. Kheraskov also joined the court circle of Grigory Orlov, and maintained friendly relations with him even after Orlov's disgrace. Struggling to balance his civil duties with his literary and theatrical activities, Kheraskov wrote a letter of resignation to Grigory Potemkin, but requested that he keep his salary in order to enter into "...a new kind of service to Her Majesty." However, the request was not granted, and in March 1775 Kheraskov resigned without pension at the rank of State Councillor. Soviet scholar Alexander Zapadov considered the resignation a disgrace; he suggests that the Empress denied his request because of his enthusiasm for Freemasonry. Kheraskov had been affiliated with Russian Freemasonry since 1773. In St. Petersburg, he belonged to the "Harpocrates" lodge. In 1776, he became the Orator of the Osiris lodge, and in 1781 became its honorary member. Kheraskov's return to Moscow in 1775 was connected with the unification of the lodges of Ivan Yelagin, a disgraced Russian historian and poet, and Johann Reichel, a German professor at Moscow University, with whom Kheraskov had quarreled when he was the university's director.

In St. Petersburg, the childless Kheraskovs sheltered Anna Karamysheva, and raised her as a daughter. At the age of 13, she married one of Kheraskov's subordinates. She later married the famous Masonic figure Alexander Labzin and became a noted memoirist.

After his resignation, Kheraskov actively participated in the Free Russian Assembly and the Free Economic Society, literary and economic societies that promoted advanced methods of farming and estate management modeled on the practices of foreign countries. He was also a member of the editorial board for Nikolay Novikov's philosophical journal Morning Light, the first of its kind.

In 1778 Kheraskov completed his epic poem Rossiad, which had taken him eight years to compose. Apparently, the "heroic poem" was brought to Catherine in manuscript form; the empress appreciated the political significance of the text and Kheraskov was brought back into favor. He received a large cash prize and in June 1778 was named curator of Moscow University.

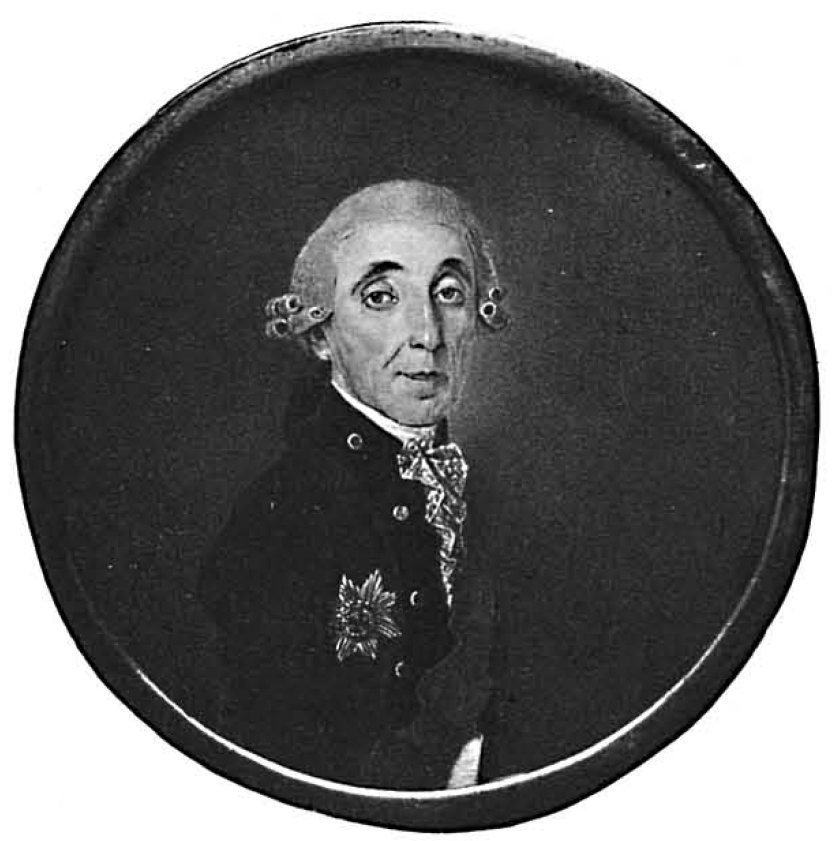
Mikhail Kheraskov in his later years. Reproduction from «Russian Portraits of the 18th and 19th Centuries. Edition of the Grand Prince Nicholas Mikhailovich Romanov», 1905—1909.

=== Curator of Moscow University and Freemasonry ===
Upon his return to the university, Kheraskov immediately undertook several ambitious projects. In December 1778, he established a boarding school for young noblemen. The boarding school produced some of the most prominent Russian literary figures of the early nineteenth-century, such as Vasily Zhukovsky, Mikhail Lermontov, and Fyodor Tyutchev.

In 1779, Kheraskov leased the university printing house to Nikolay Novikov for a period of ten years, which allowed him to greatly increase his publishing activity. Specifically, Novikov published Rossiad and began to publish the first edition of Kheraskov's collected works. At the suggestion of Yekaterina Vorontsova-Dashkova, Kheraskov became a member of the recently created Russian Academy, and quotations from his works were included in the Dictionary of the Russian Academy. In 1786, Kheraskov was awarded the Order of St. Vladimir, Second Class.

Kheraskov and his wife lived in Moscow at the estate of his half-brother, Nikolai Trubetskoy, or in a country estate Ochakovo, which they owned jointly. At that estate, the couple sometimes entertained the memoirist and agriculturalist Andrey Bolotov. There was an in-house theater in both of Kheraskov's estates, where he would stage his plays. He never abandoned his interest in Freemasonry, and along with the mystic and translator Alexei Kutuzov became one of the founders of the "Latona" chapter. In 1782 he was initiated into the theoretical degree of the Rosicrucian Society and for two years was a member of his local chapter.

Kheraskov's educational projects were connected with his Masonic activities. In 1779, Kheraskov hired Johann Georg Schwarz as the university's Professor of German. Schwarz was a member of Trubetskoy's Masonic lodge in Moscow. On the initiative of Schwarz and with the support of Kheraskov, an open Freemasons Pedagogical (1779) and Translation (1782) Seminary was founded. The latter was established at the expense of members of the so-called "Friendly Scientific Society", which included many prominent Masons. The works of novice members of the Friendly Scientific Society and other university students comprised a significant part of the works and translations published in the journals Moscow Monthly Edition (1781), Evening Dawn (1782), and The Resting Industrialist (1784).

In 1789, the start of the French Revolution soured Catherine's attitude toward Enlightenment philosophy. As a result, Kheraskov and other Masons were threatened with imperial disgrace. The Moscow commander-in-chief, Alexander Prozorovsky, informed the Empress that Kheraskov arranged secret Masonic rituals and gatherings at Ochakovo. Despite the seriousness of these charges and Catherine's intention to remove him from office, Kheraskov managed to remain as curator thanks to the intercession of the famous poet Gavrila Derzhavin and Platon Zubov, the last of Catherine's lovers. However, after Novikov was arrested in 1792 and his printing house was confiscated, a report written by Prozorovsky informed the Empress that Nikolai Trubetskoy and Kheraskov had destroyed incriminating papers and other materials at Ochakovo. In August 1792, when an imperial decree for Novikov and his accomplices was issued, Kheraskov's name was not mentioned. However, he was now in "unofficial" disgrace and could not attend to affairs at the university. Nevertheless, he still continued to compose his annual address to the Empress.

=== Final Years ===
Unlike his mother, Emperor Paul I was sympathetic to the Masons. As he had for the two previous rulers, Kheraskov addressed an ode to Paul upon the new emperor's coronation in 1796. Later that year, Kheraskov was made Privy Councillor and awarded 600 serfs. In February 1798 an imperial rescript recognized Kheraskov for his poetry. In March 1799 he was awarded the Order of St. Anna, 1st class.

Kheraskov dedicated a new poem to the emperor entitled "Tsar, or the Savior of Novgorod", for which he was again recognized by imperial rescript. Following Paul's murder in 1801, Kheraskov was briefly dismissed as curator due to a misunderstanding, but he was restored to his position shortly thereafter by Alexander I. For the fourth time, Kheraskov wrote an ode celebrating a new sovereign's reign. In November 1802, the 70-year-old Kheraskov was dismissed from service with a pension "by request and due to old age."

The elderly poet spent the last years of his life in Moscow engaged in literary work. Up until his death he worked with the journals Herald of Europe, Patriot and Friend of Enlightenment. Kheraskov died on 27 September (9 October), 1807 in Moscow. He was buried at the Donskoy Monastery Cemetery. His tragedy Zareida and Rostislav was published posthumously under a pseudonym. It received an award by the Russian Academy for 500 rubles, which his widow left at the Academy's disposal.

== Personality ==
No comprehensive library of Kheraskov was preserved. His documents personal letters, and correspondence with government officials and literary figures are spread across various Russian collections. Practically all of his contemporaries, both older and younger, commented on his "gentle" nature and noble character.

Kheraskov avoided social events, and even when in the country sought solitude. At Ochakovo, he especially enjoyed sitting in a limewood grove. He usually rose early in the morning and immediately engaged in reading or writing. He had a habit of walking around his office while working and spoke the written texts allowed to himself.

The Russian memoirist Yuri Nikitich Bartenev noted that Kheraskov was modest in dress and diet, and abstained from most luxuries. For example, he never wore boots made to order, but bought them at the market. He also did not enjoy card games, which were popular among the eighteenth century aristocracy. Bartenev describes a "sullenness" that Kheraskov was known for when there were newcomers to his literary circle, but around those he knew well he was admired for his eloquence, and "his jokes were always very amusing and reflected his ingenuity and wittiness."
