= United Grand Lodge of Russia =

- Established: 11 October 2008
- Location: Russia; Moscow
- Grand Master: V. Ch.
- Website: United Grand Lodge of Russia

United Grand Lodge of Russia (UGLR) - is a traditional Russian Masonic obedience. It is made up of eleven lodges in the cities of Moscow and St. Petersburg. The United Grand Lodge of Russia was founded on October 11, 2008, in St. Petersburg.

== History ==
=== The Regular Grand Lodge of Russia ===
The Regular Grand Lodge of Russia originates after the schism of the Grand Lodge of Russia in March 2001. The schism was caused by a disagreement (of around 100 Freemasons) with the internal policies conducted by the leadership of the Grand Lodge of Russia (GLR). The historian of freemasonry A. I. Serkov, in his three volumes on the history of Russian masonry during the twentieth, says that the following lodges left: «Harmony» N°1, «Lotus» N°2, «Astrea» N°3, «Jupiter» N°7, «Four Crowned» N°8 and «Orion» N°15.

On April 16, 2001, the Constituent Assembly enacted the establishment of the "Regular Grand Lodge of Russia" (RGLR) [6]. According to the material available in the dictionary of "Masons" written by the Doctor of Sciences in History S.P. Karpachev, the "Regular Grand Lodge of Russia" applied for recognition at the United Grand Lodge of England and for the recognition at the great Anglo-Saxon lodges. From 2003 until 2005, were founded three lodges in St. Petersburg: "Sphinx", "Pelican" and "Resurrection". In the 2005, under the jurisdiction of the RGRL, was founded the Provincial Grand Lodge of St. Petersburg based on four lodges ("Astrea", "Sphinx", "Pelican" and "Resurrection").

=== The Union ===
After the Assembly of the GLR in 2007, a group of about 30 freemasons, members of the lodges «Harmony», «Lotus», «Phoenix» and «A. S. Pushkin "decided to leave the institution. Then there was a meeting between them and the members of the Regular Grand Lodge of Russia. During this meeting, the union was agreed upon and the assembly chose a new name: the Grand Lodge of Russia. Thanks to the work of the Grand Master A. S., some clarifications were made in relation to this new name.

=== Foundation of the United Grand Lodge of Russia ===
In June 2008, some members of the "Regular Grand Lodge of Russia" (RGLR) tried to establish relationships with the Grand Lodges of France. The history of the foundation and installation of the UGLR is described as follows by the masonry historian A. I. Serkov: On October 11 of 2008, during the Solemn Assembly and under the patronage of the Grand Lodge of France, the United Grand Lodge of Russia was established. The Grand Lodge of France granted the UGLR a patent for the right to operate according to the Ancient and Accepted Scottish Rite. Eleven lodges were part of the UGLR.

In January 2009, two new lodges from Kharkov jurisdiction were added: the "Geometry" and the "Ukrainian Phoenix".

== The principles of the UGLR ==
- May be admitted to the United Grand Lodge of Russia, male candidates who have reached the age of 21, believers in the great Architect of the Universe, that have a good reputation with no criminal record.
- The United Grand Lodge of Russia carries out its Masonic labors for the glory of the Great Architect of the Universe. All vows are made in the sight of the three great Masonic Lights: the Book of Sacred Law, the square and the compass. During the lodge labors, the lights are placed on the altar.
- The United Grand Lodge of Russia proclaims its absolute loyalty and complete devotion to the homeland. Discussions on political and religious issues are prohibited.
- The United Grand Lodge of Russia refers to the Constitution and to the General Regulation of the UGLR, to the Old Charges of Free Masons, to the Constitutions of James Anderson and to the Masonic Landmarks of Albert Mackey.

== Lodges of UGLR ==
- #1 Harmony (Moscow)
- #2 Lotus (Moscow)
- #3 Astrea (St. Petersburg)
- #11 Phoenix (Moscow)

The members of the UGLR are part of different professional categories: researchers, soldiers, entrepreneurs, creatives, educators, doctors, employees, priests. They are from all age groups, of all political persuasions and religious convictions.

The total number of Masons is around 70.

== Temple of UGLR ==
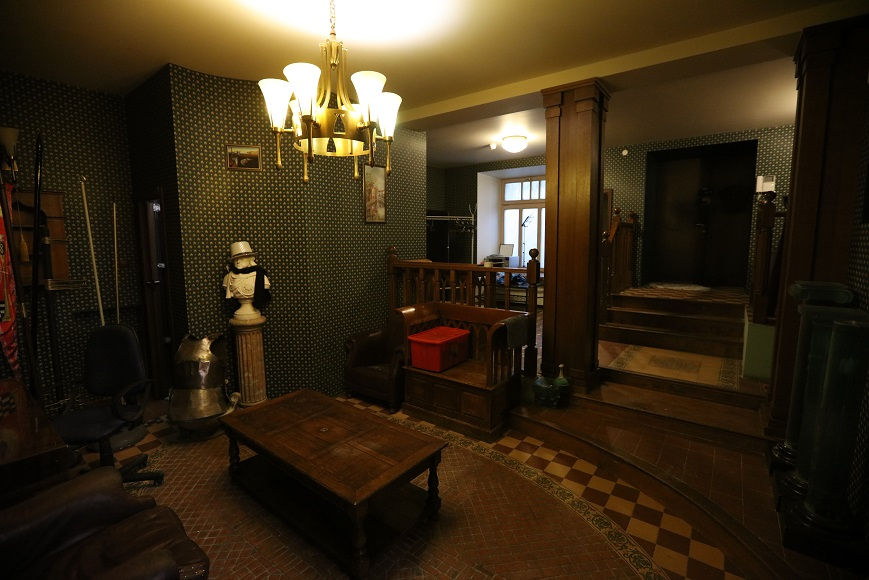
Lobby

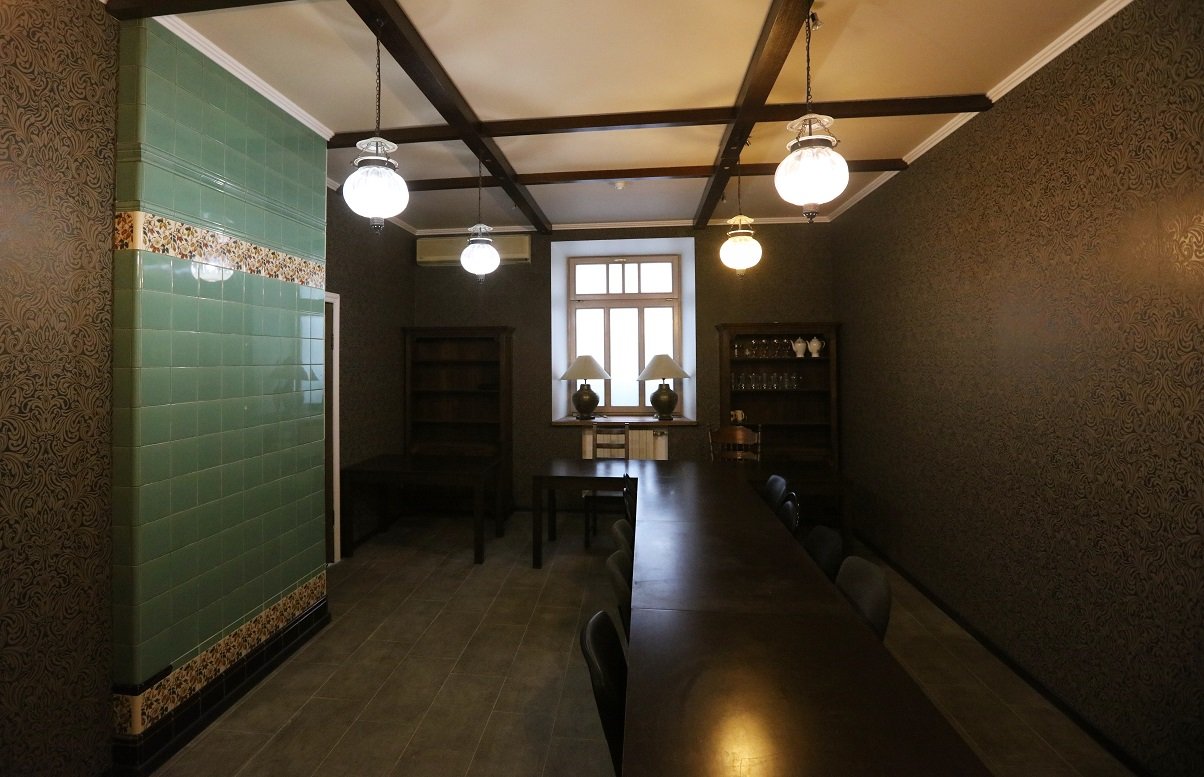
Dining room

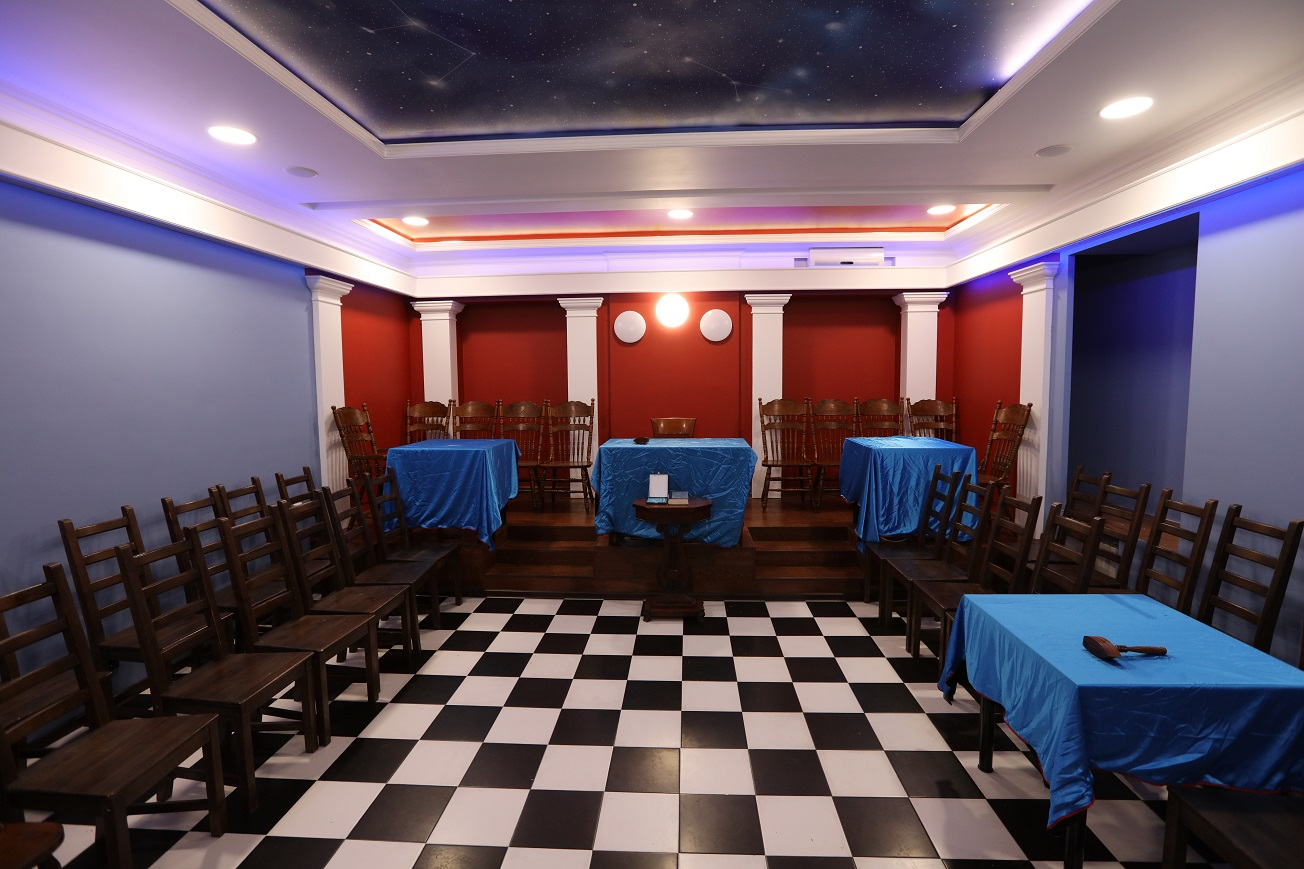
Lodge room

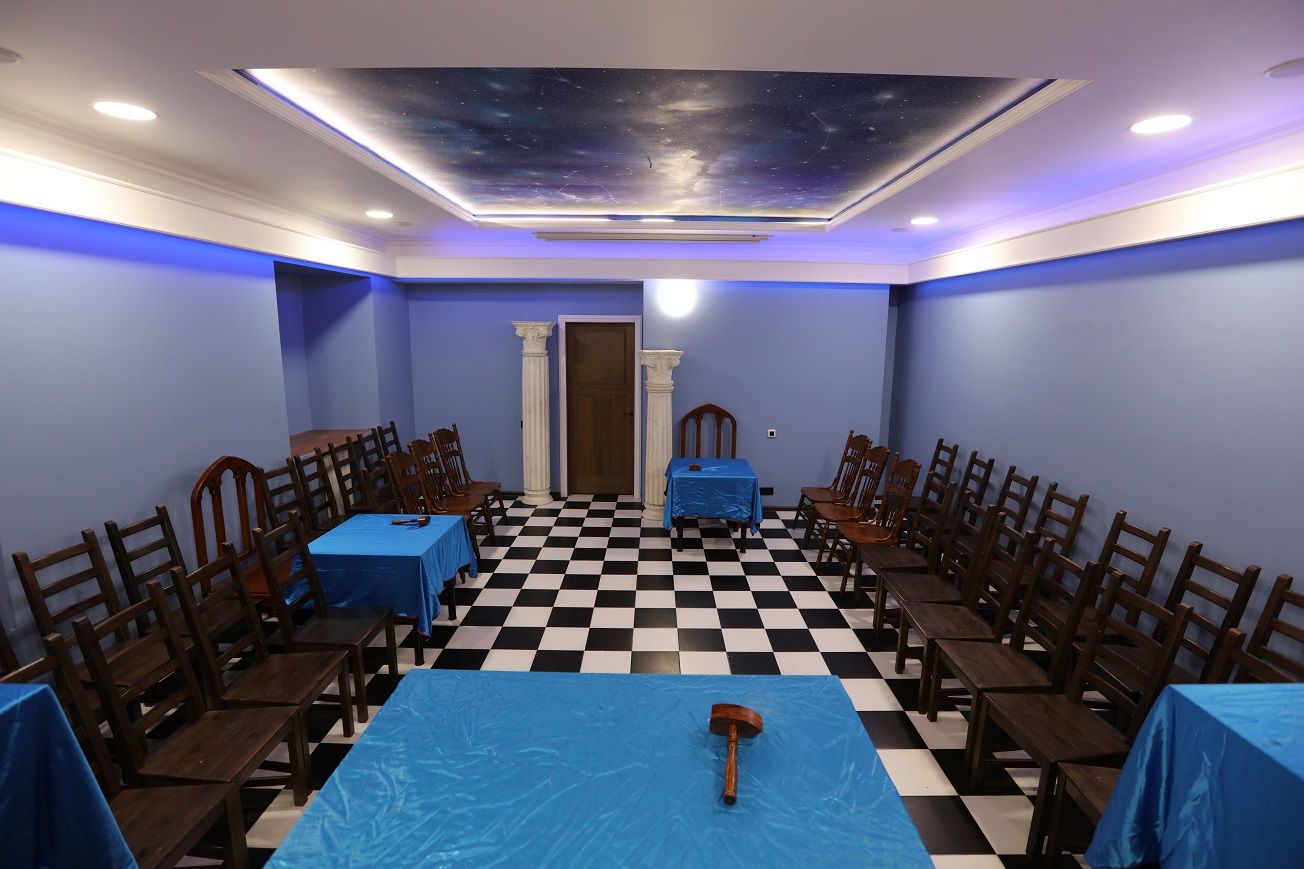
Lodge room

== See also ==
- History of Freemasonry in Russia
- History of Freemasonry
- List of Masonic Grand Lodges
