= Labzin =

Labzin is a Russian male surname. Its feminine counterpart is Labzina. It may refer to

- Alexander Labzin (1766–1825), a leading figure of the Russian Enlightenment
- Alexey Labzin (born 1978), Russian Paralympian athlete
- Vladislav Labzin (born 1996), Russian football player
