= Yelagin Palace =

Palace in Saint Petersburg, Russia

Coordinates: 59.9793°N 30.27°E

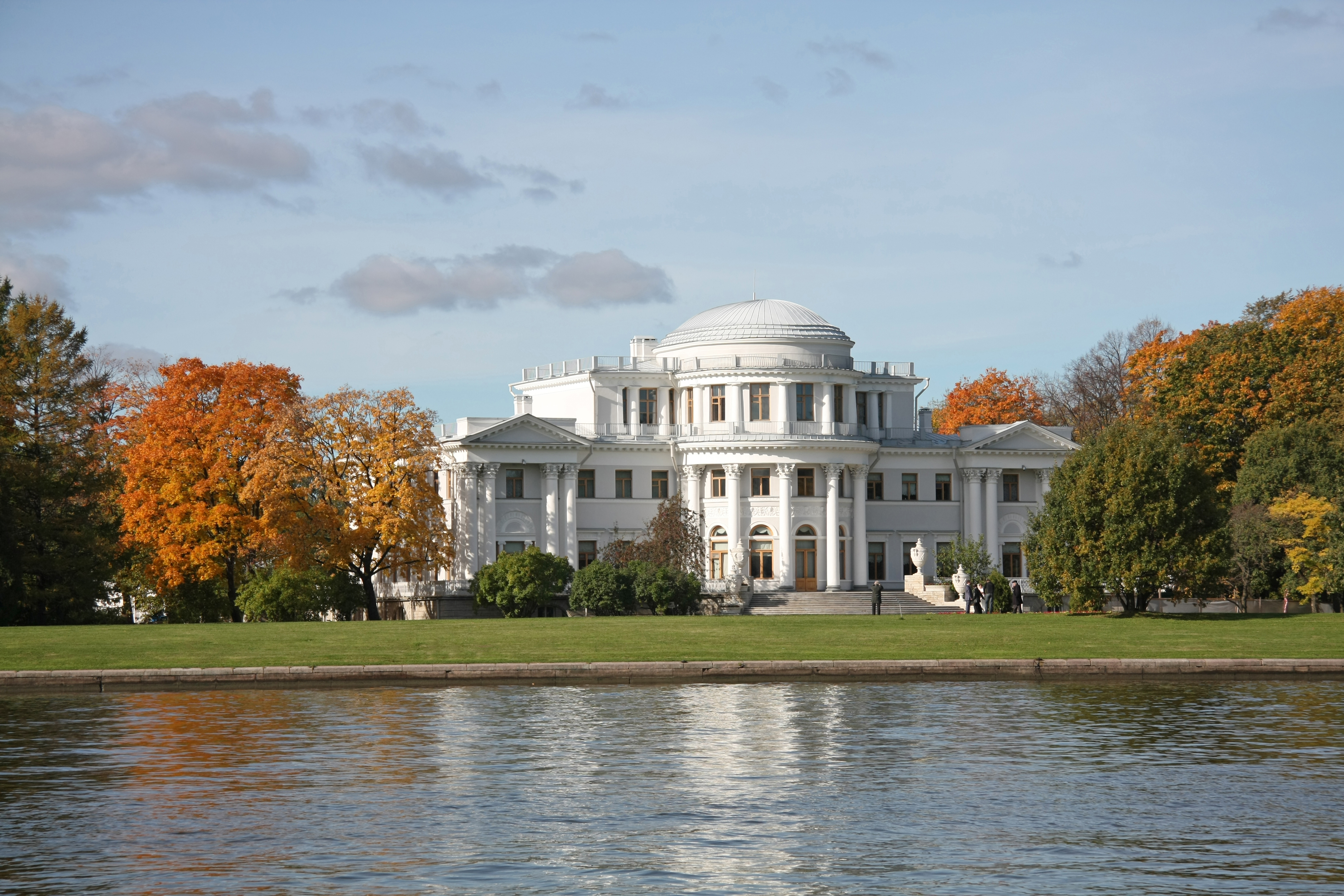
The east façade

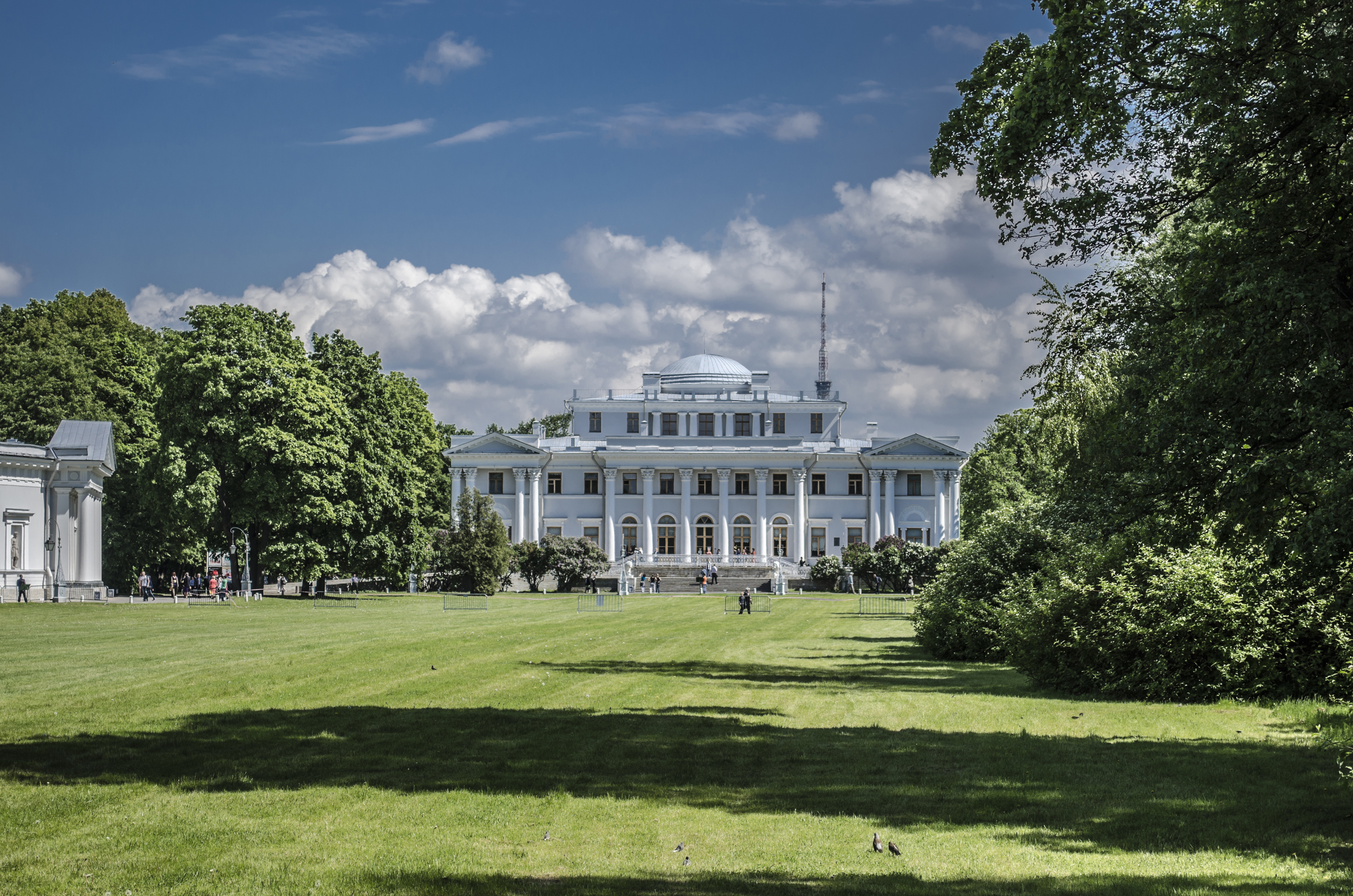
The west façade and park

Yelagin Palace (Елагин дворец; also Yelaginsky or Yelaginoostrovsky Dvorets) is a Palladian-style large villa on Yelagin Island in Saint Petersburg. It served as a royal summer palace during the early 19th- century reign of Alexander I. The villa was designed for Alexander's mother, Maria Fyodorovna, by architect Carlo Rossi. It was constructed in 1822 on the site of an earlier mansion built during the rule of Catherine the Great. The mansion was destroyed during World War II but was rebuilt. It currently houses a museum.

The isle to the north of the imperial Russian capital owes its name to its former proprietor, Ivan Yelagin (1725–94), a close ally of Catherine II from her early days as Grand Duchess. The first villa on the site might have been designed by Giacomo Quarenghi. Yelagin was fascinated with the idea of extracting gold from ordinary materials and retreated to the villa for his secretive research in alchemy. Count Cagliostro was summoned by Yelagin to help him in these activities, but fled the island after Yelagin's secretary had slapped him in the face.

After the Dowager Empress Maria Feodorovna declared that she was too old to make daily trips to such distant residences as Pavlovsk Palace and Gatchina Palace, her son Alexander I bought the estate from Yelagin's heirs and asked Carlo Rossi to redesign the villa. Its lavish Neoclassical interiors were decorated by Giovanni Battista Scotti, Vasily Demuth-Malinovsky, and Stepan Pimenov.

After Maria Feodorovna's death, the palace remained deserted for long periods of time. Nicholas II leased it to his prime ministers such as Sergei Witte, Pyotr Stolypin, and Ivan Goremykin. In June 1908 Stolypin lived in a wing of the Yelagin Palace; in July 1914 the Council of Ministers under Ivan Goremykin convened there. The Bolsheviks turned the palace compound into "a museum to the old way of life". In the German siege of Leningrad during World War II, it was damaged by a shell and burnt to the ground.

The mansion was rebuilt in the 1950s to serve as a resort for workers. Since 1987 it has housed a collection of objets d'art from the 18th and 19th centuries, notably precious glassware. The entrance is guarded by two lion sculptures, inspired by the Medici lions in Florence.
