= Yelagin Island =

Island in Russia

Елагин остров
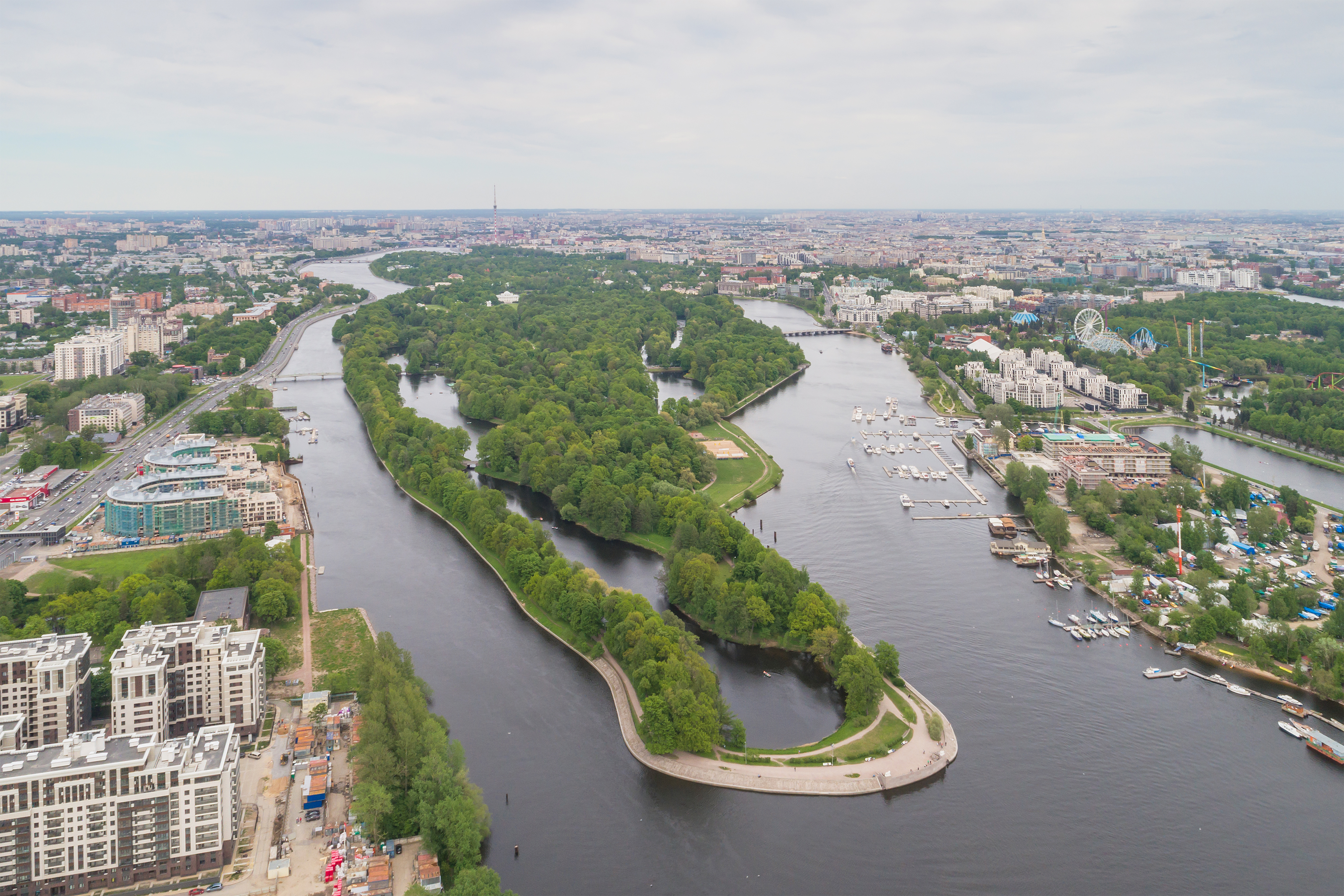
- Yelagin Island, aerial view

- Location within Russia

Geography
- Location: Gulf of Finland
- Coordinates: 59°58′46″N 30°15′37″E
- Archipelago: The Islands (historical area in Saint Petersburg, Russia)
- Area: 0.94 km^{2} (0.36 sq mi)
- Length: 2.1 km (1.3 mi)
- Width: 0.8 km (0.5 mi)
- Highest elevation: 18 m (59 ft)

Administration
- Russian Federation
- Region: Saint Petersburg

Yelagin Island (Central Saint Petersburg)
Yelagin Island

Yelagin Island (Russian: Елагин остров) is a park island at the mouth of the Neva River which is part of St. Petersburg, Russia. Yelagin Island is home to the Yelagin Palace and has a few other buildings as well. A former suburban estate of 18th-century Russian nobles and later of Empress Maria, widow of Paul I of Russia, since the Russian Revolution of 1917 it has served as a city public park. It is officially Central Park of Culture and Rest, named after Sergey Kirov, a notable Bolshevik leader of the early 1930s who supervised development of the city.

== Geography ==
It is a flat island located in the delta of the Neva River, between the Grand Nevka branch and the Central Nevka. The island has a surface of 94 hectares. It stretches from east to west for 2.1 km and has a maximum width from north to south of 0.8 km.

== History ==
The island initially served as a wooded retreat for the ruling class. Originally known as Melgunov Island, the island was later named for its former owner, Ivan Yelagin (1725–93), best known as a founding father of Russian Freemasonry. The palace was built in 1786 in the eastern section of the island.

In 1817, the island was bought for 350,000 rubles by the Imperial Cabinet on behalf of the Russian Monarchy. The following year the palace grounds were thoroughly redesigned and restructured in a project led by architect Carlo Rossi. The works lasted four years and included a vast English landscape garden with a system of canals, bridges and ponds, as well as grottoes and gazebos.

Formerly off-limits for most local people, after the Russian Revolution, the isle was opened to the public as an urban park. It still bears the name of Sergei Kirov, a Bolshevik leader of the city in the 1930s.

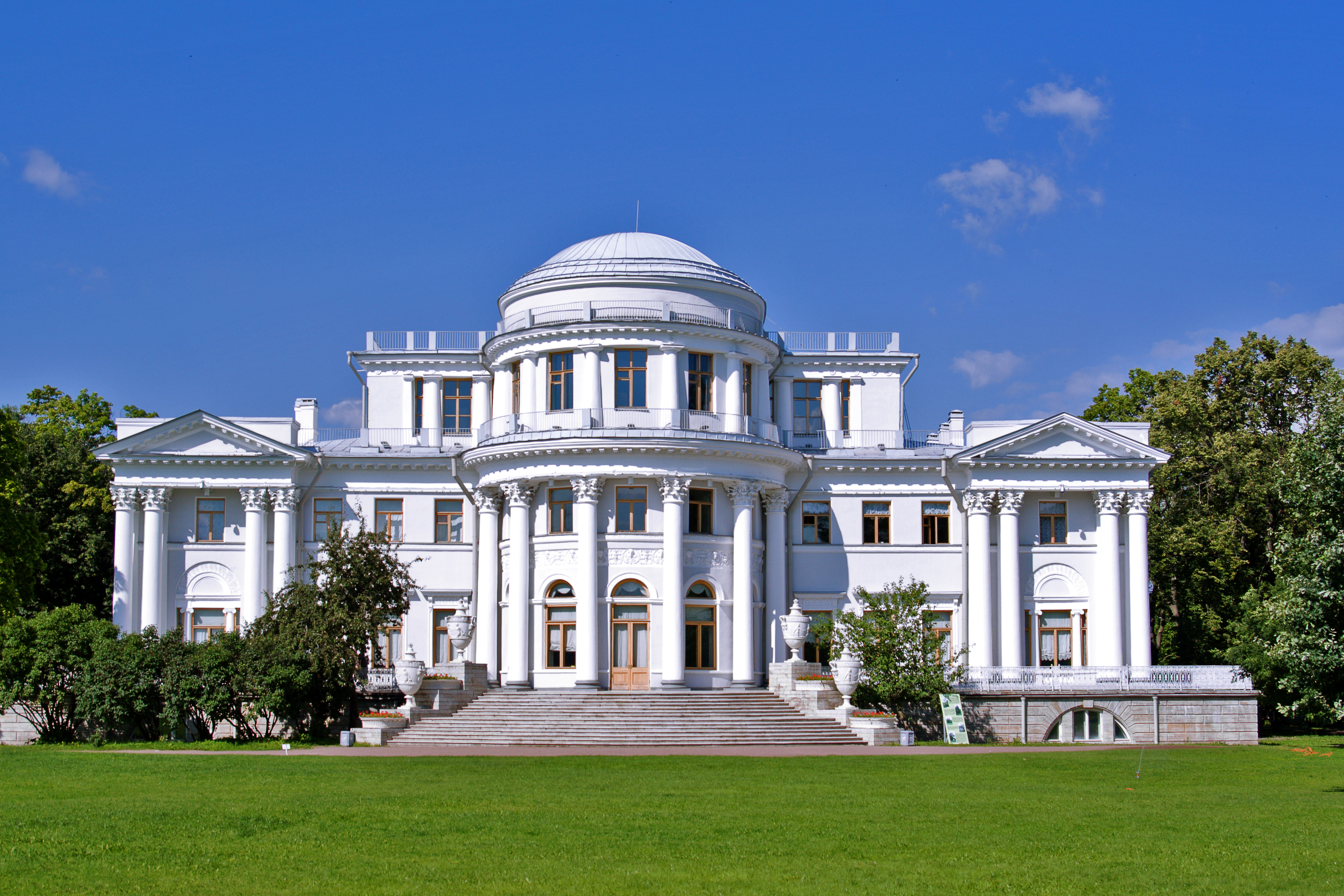
Yelagin Palace

== Current use ==
In present times Yelagin Island is a popular weekend destination for Petersburgers. Visitors can rent boats to navigate the island's several ponds and canals. There are also rollerblade and bicycle rentals, as well as several attractions for children including pony rides, miniature trains and playgrounds. The island also features several kilometers of paved pathways.

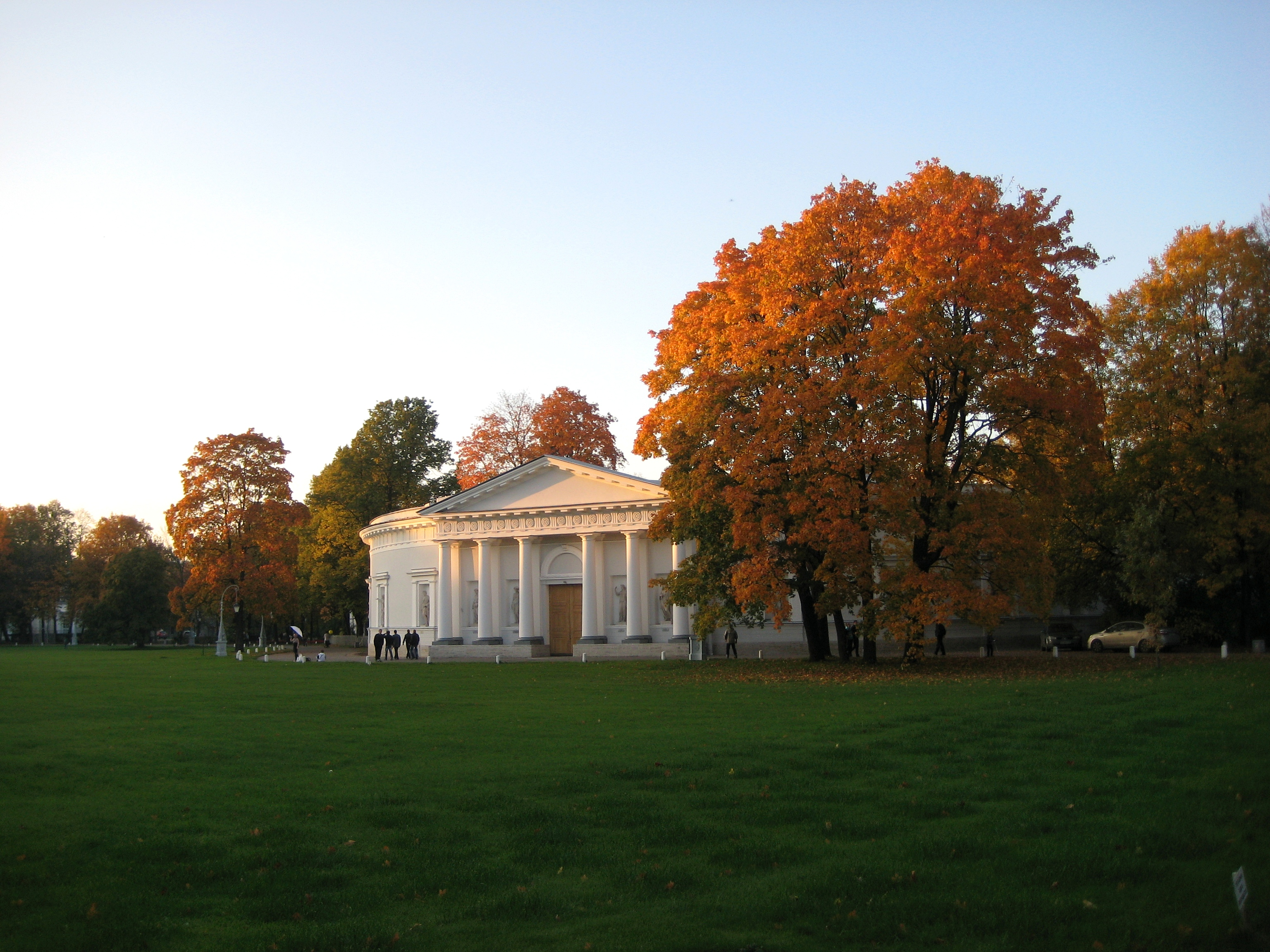
The palace in the park complex on the island. Kitchen Building.

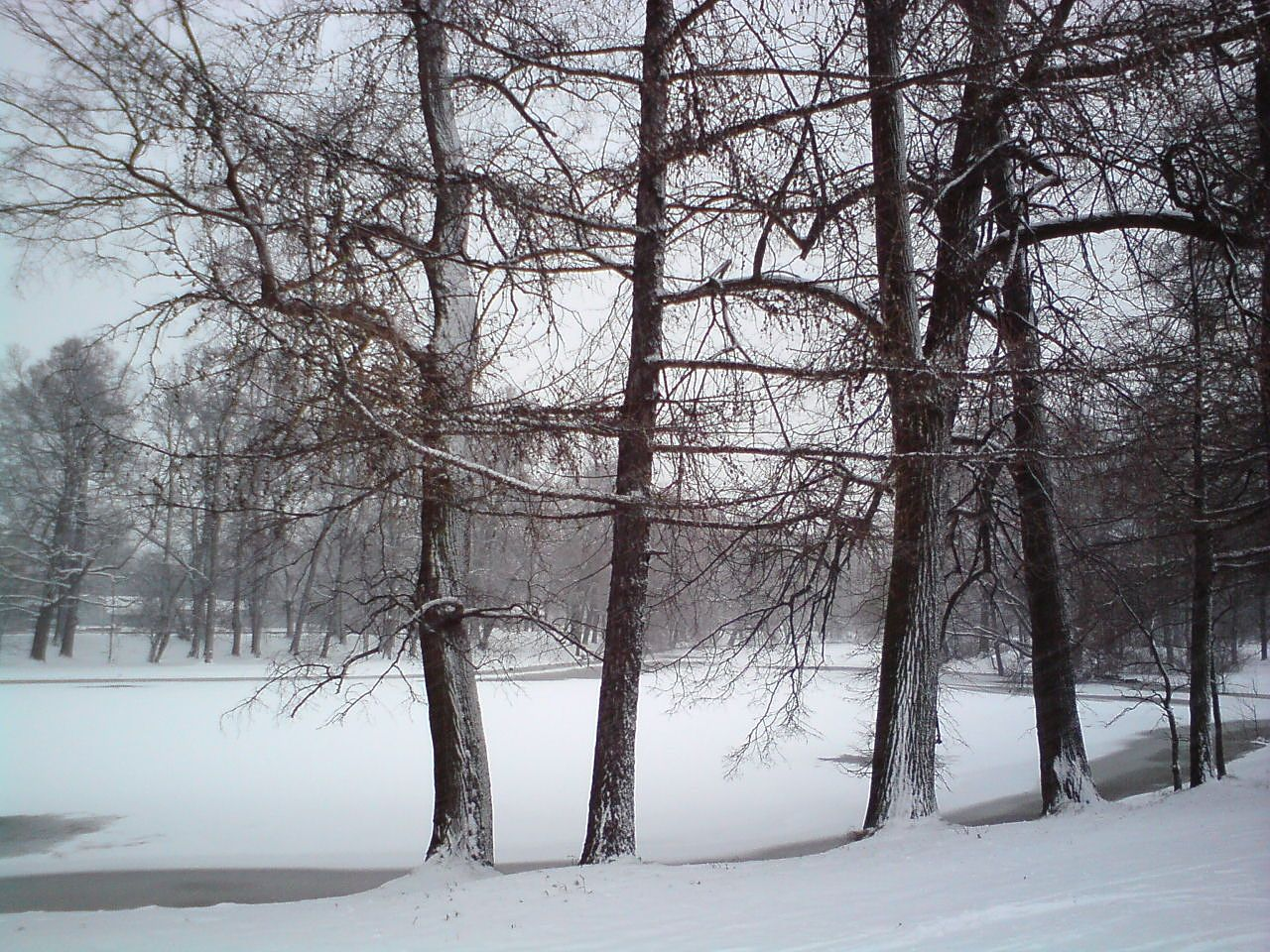
Winter on Yelagin Island

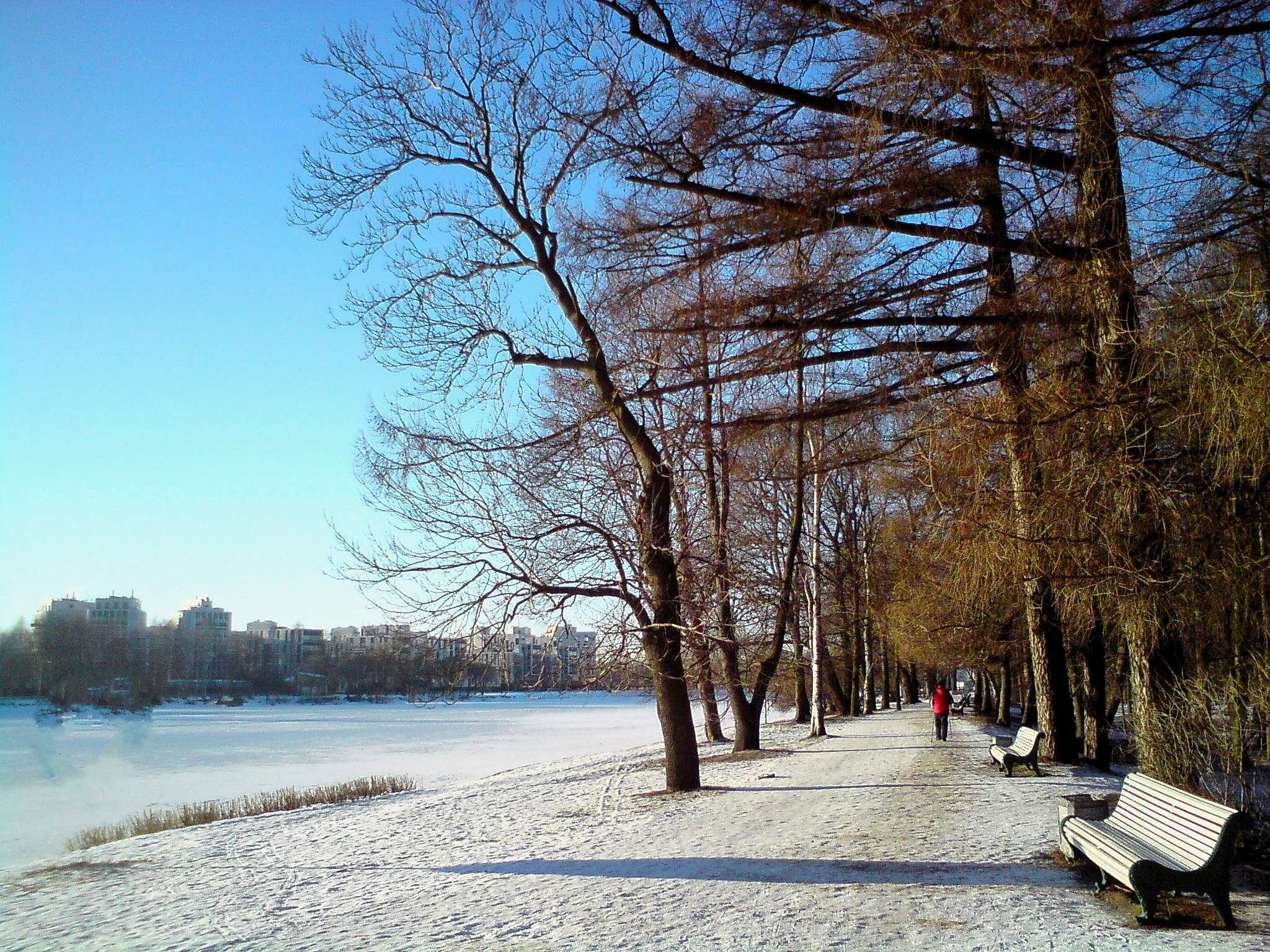
Central Neva Quay in the winter

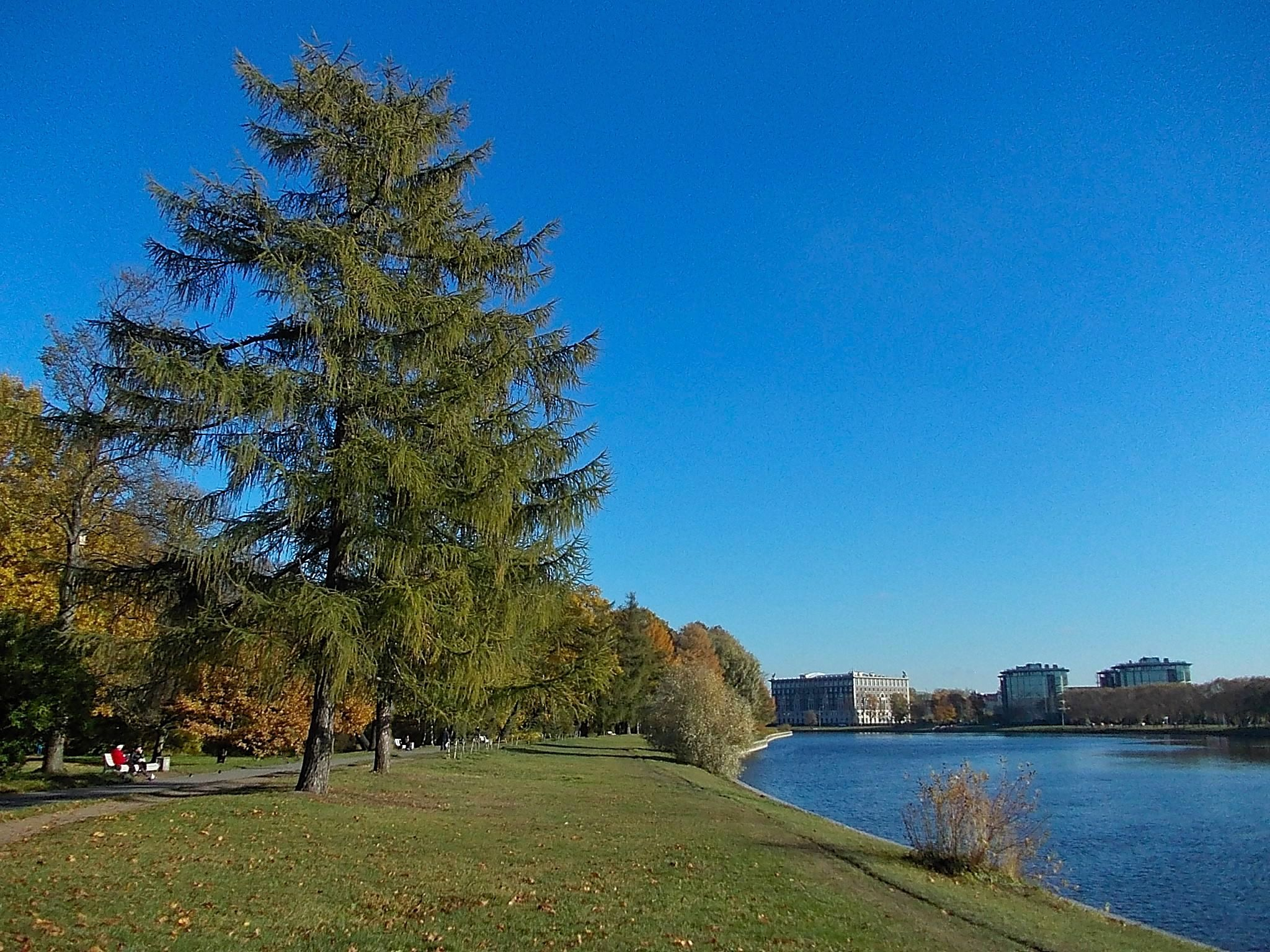
Central Neva Quay in the summer

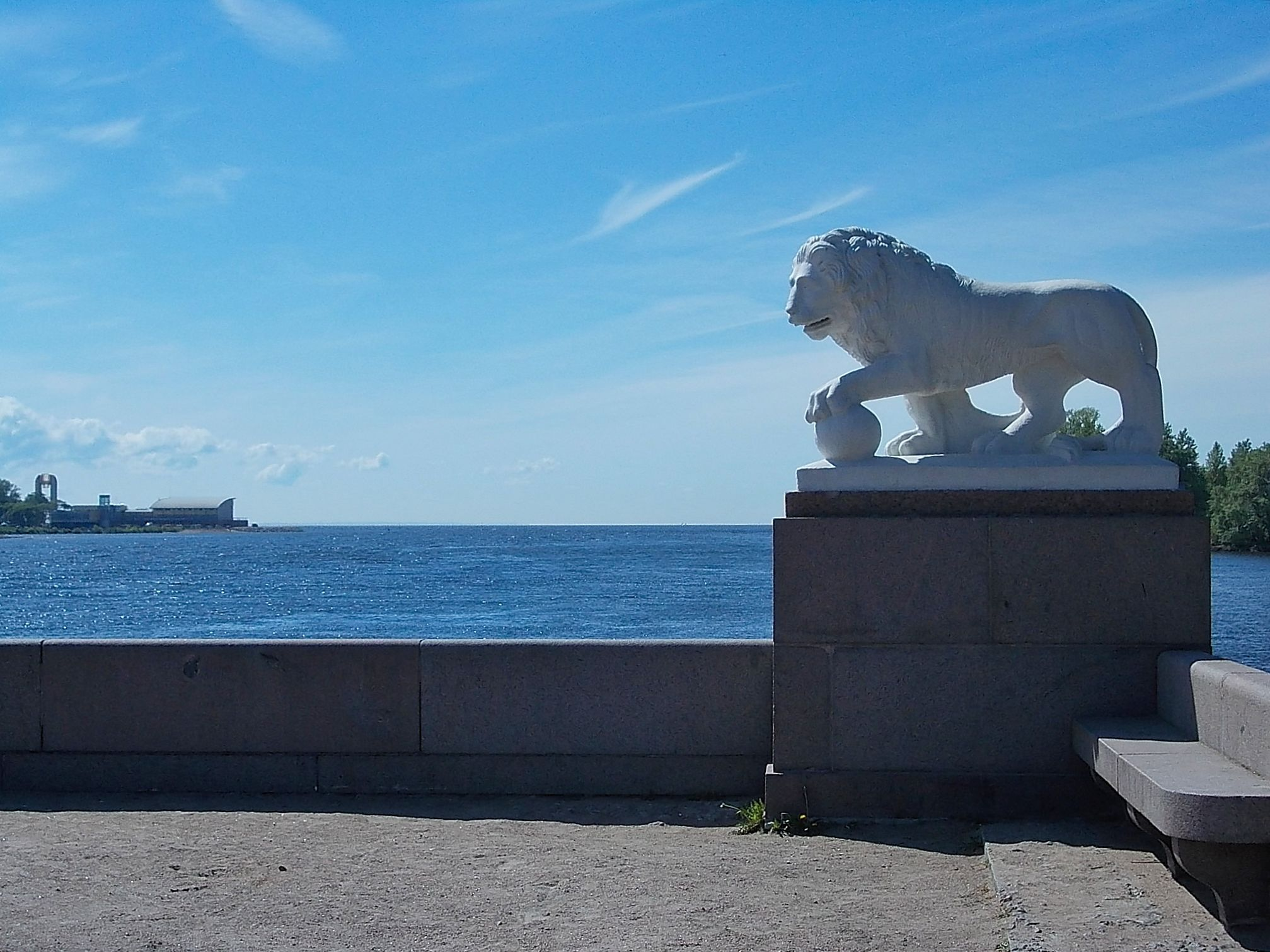
Medici Lion at the western landhead

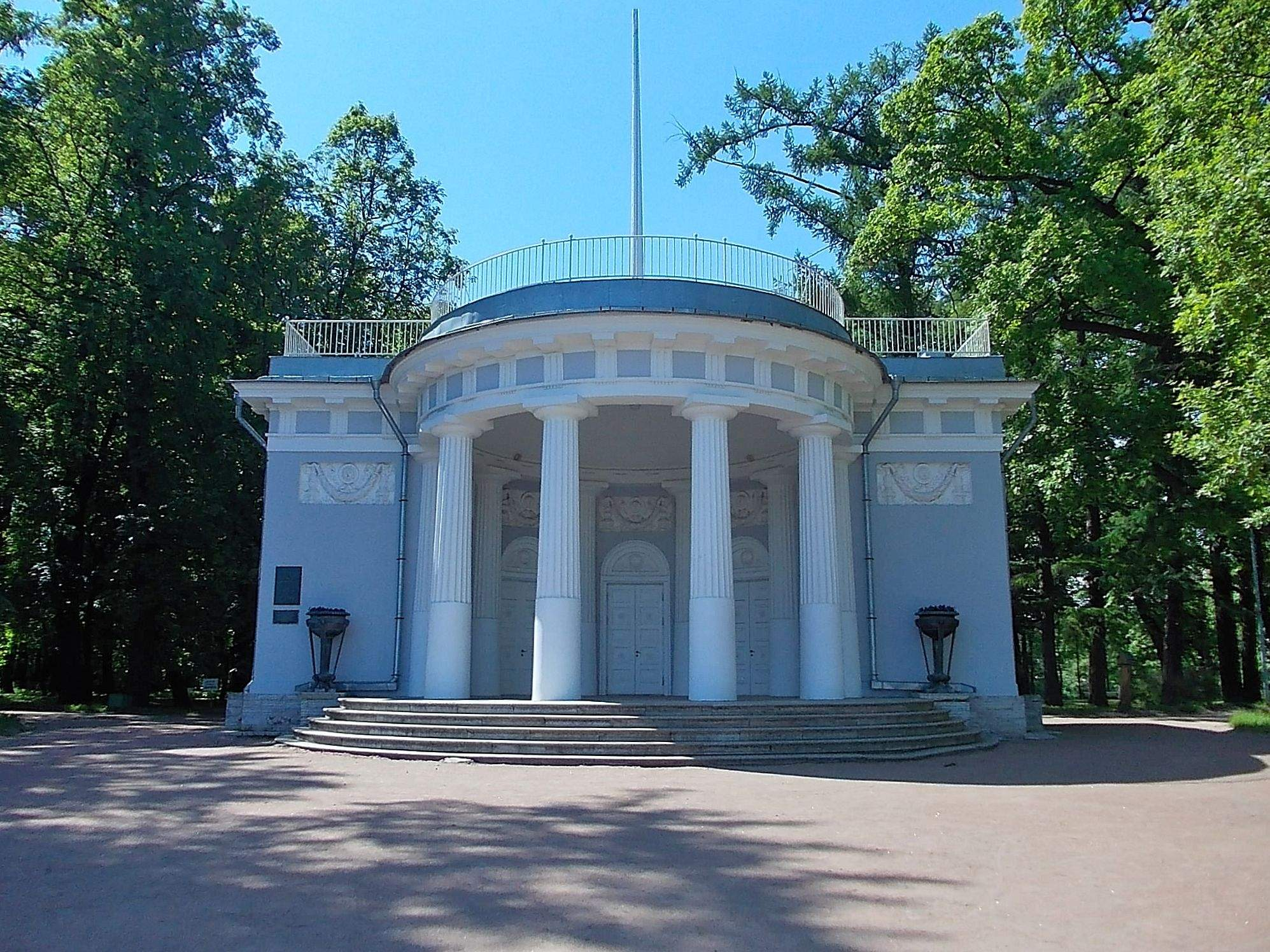
A pavilion in the park

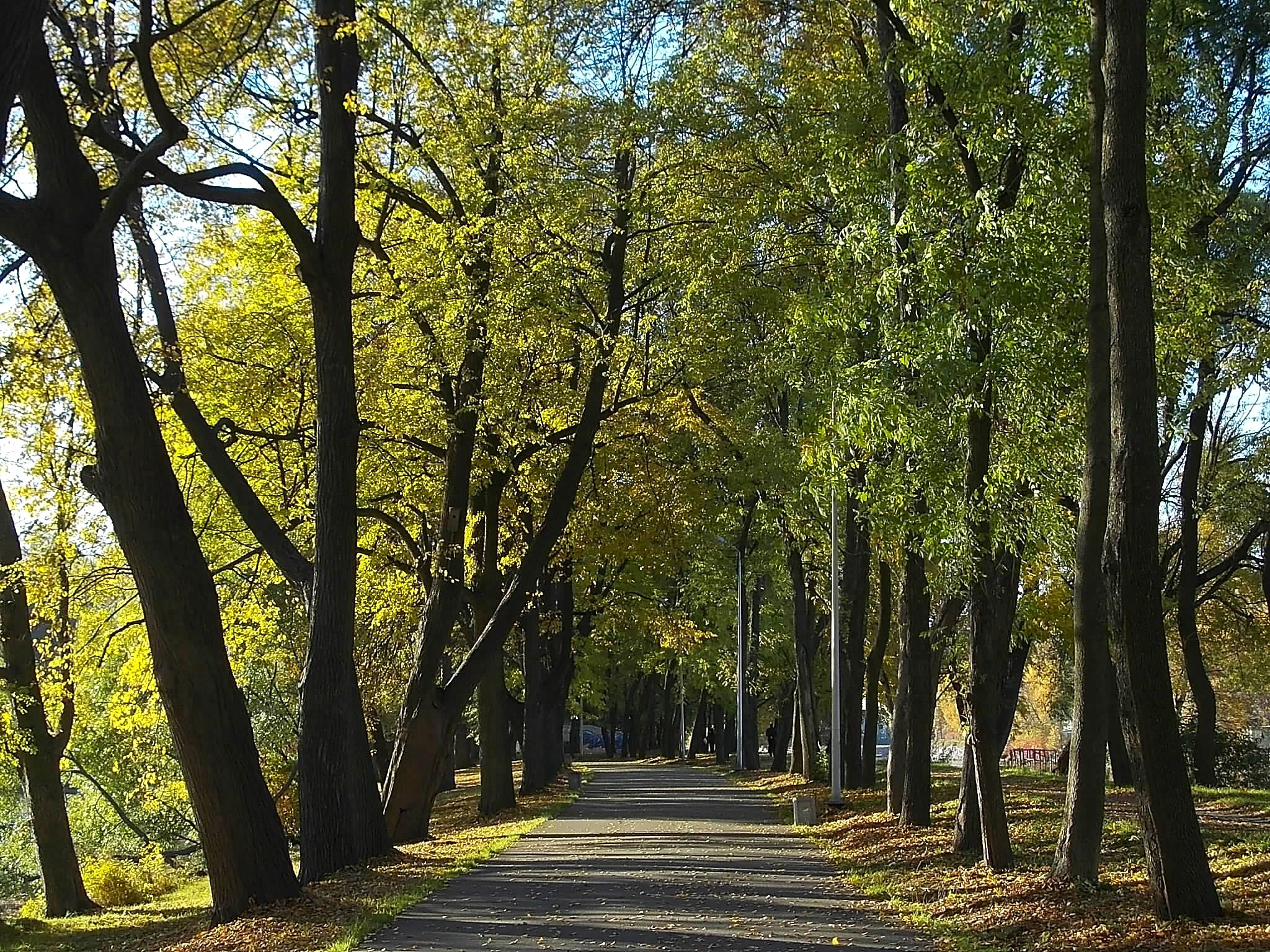
A shady alley on the island

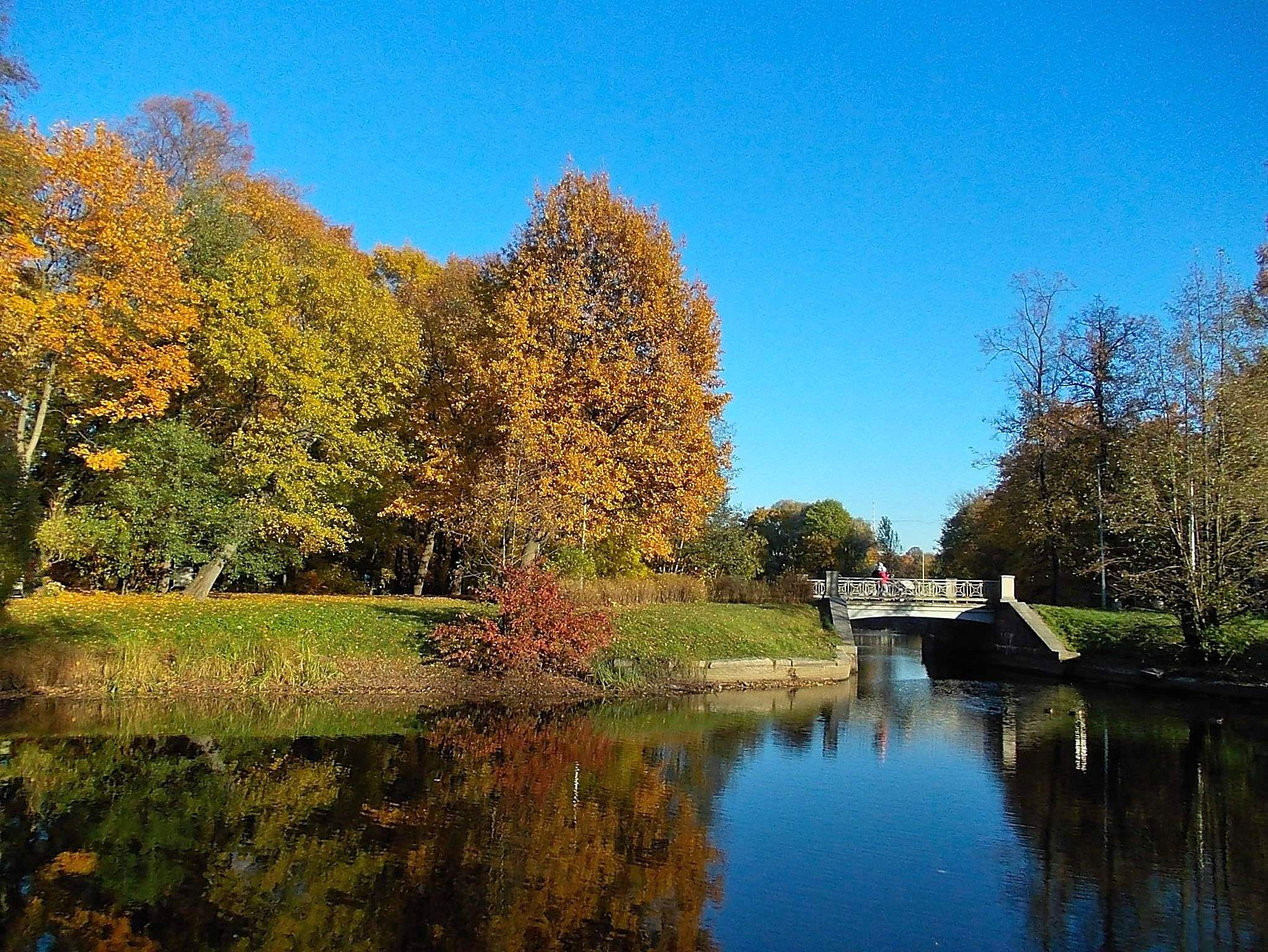
A pond in the park

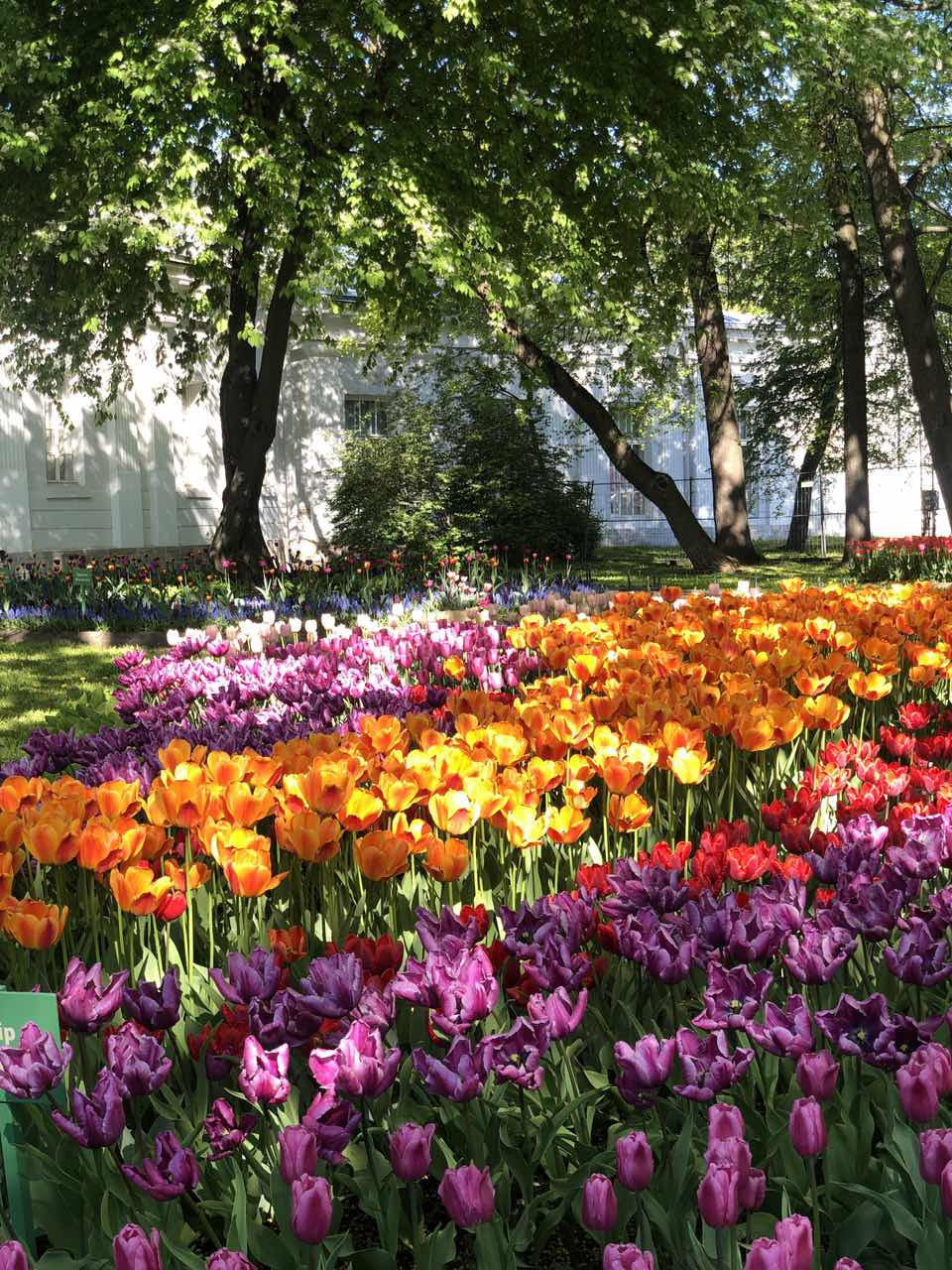
Flowers in the garden of Yelagin Island

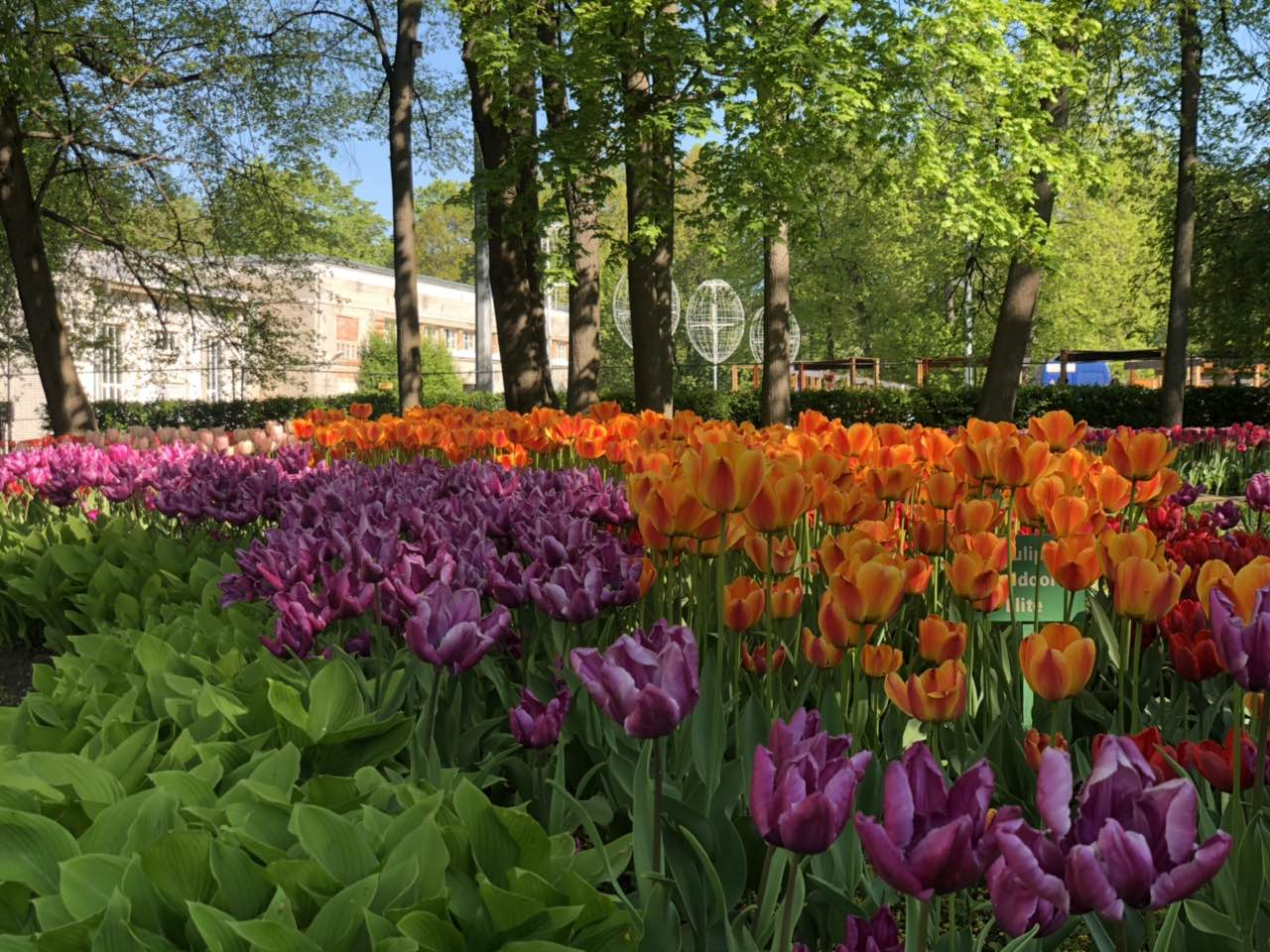
Garden on the island

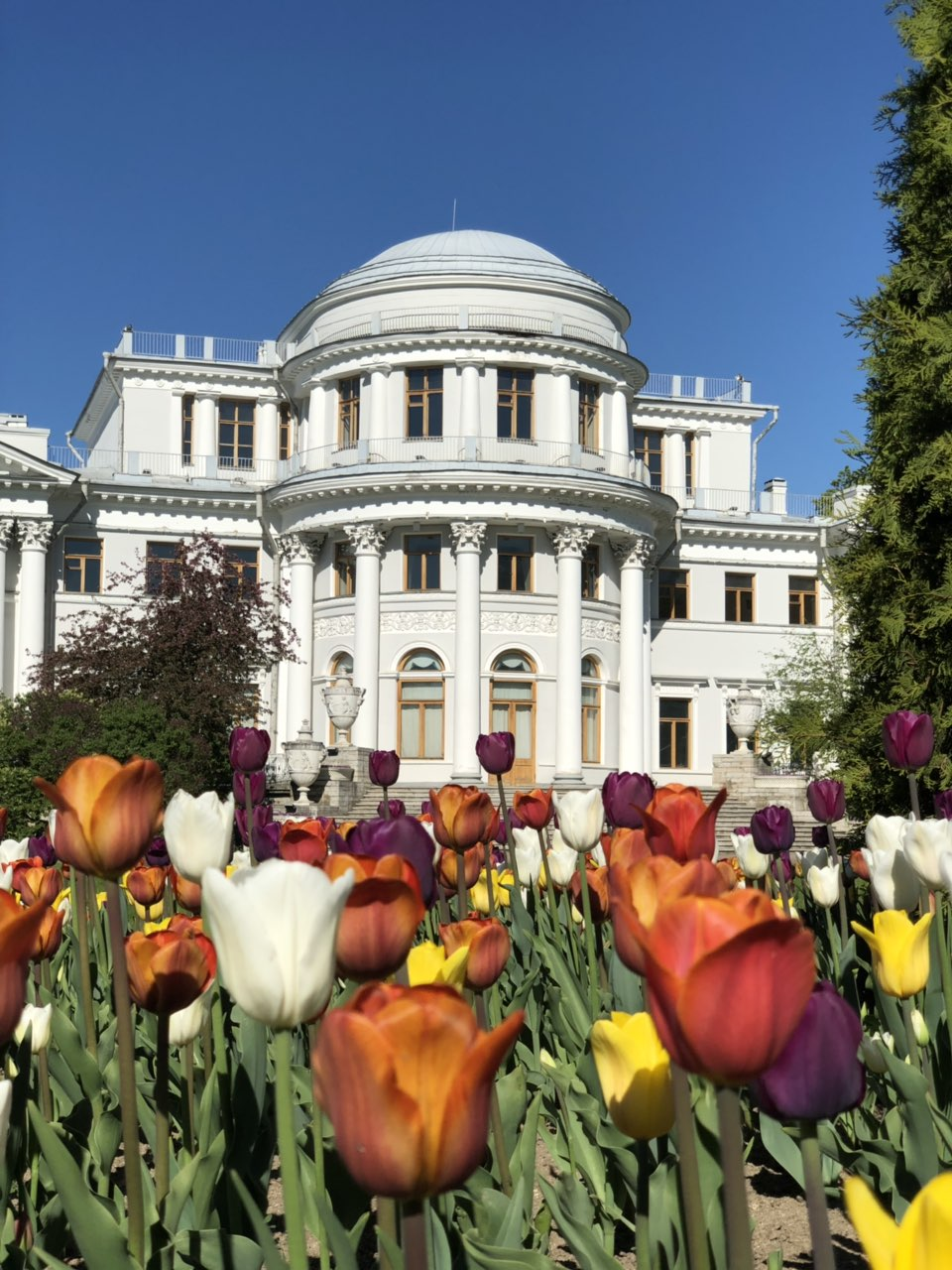
Flower beds in front of the palace

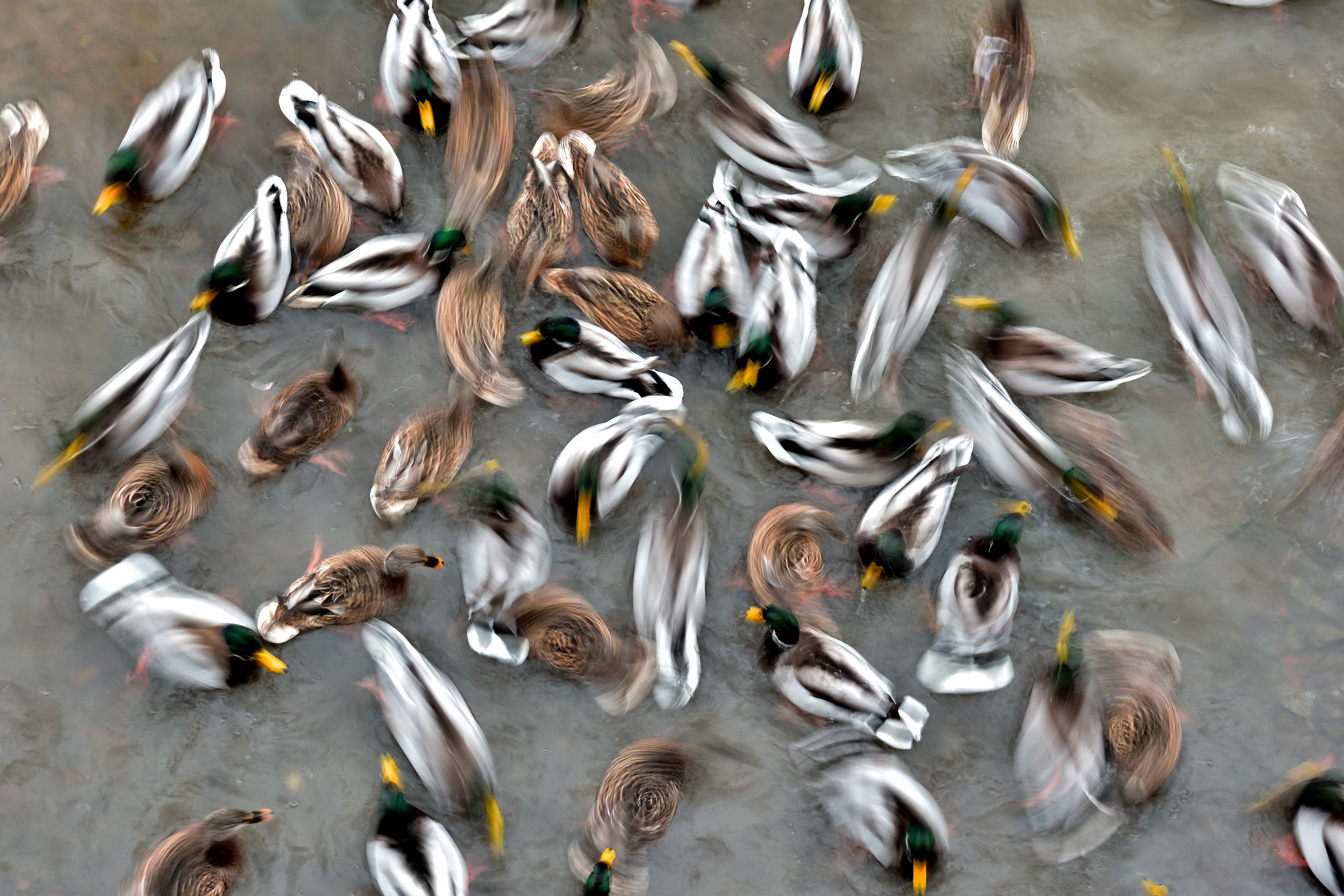
Behavior of a flock of mallard ducks when feeding visitors to the park

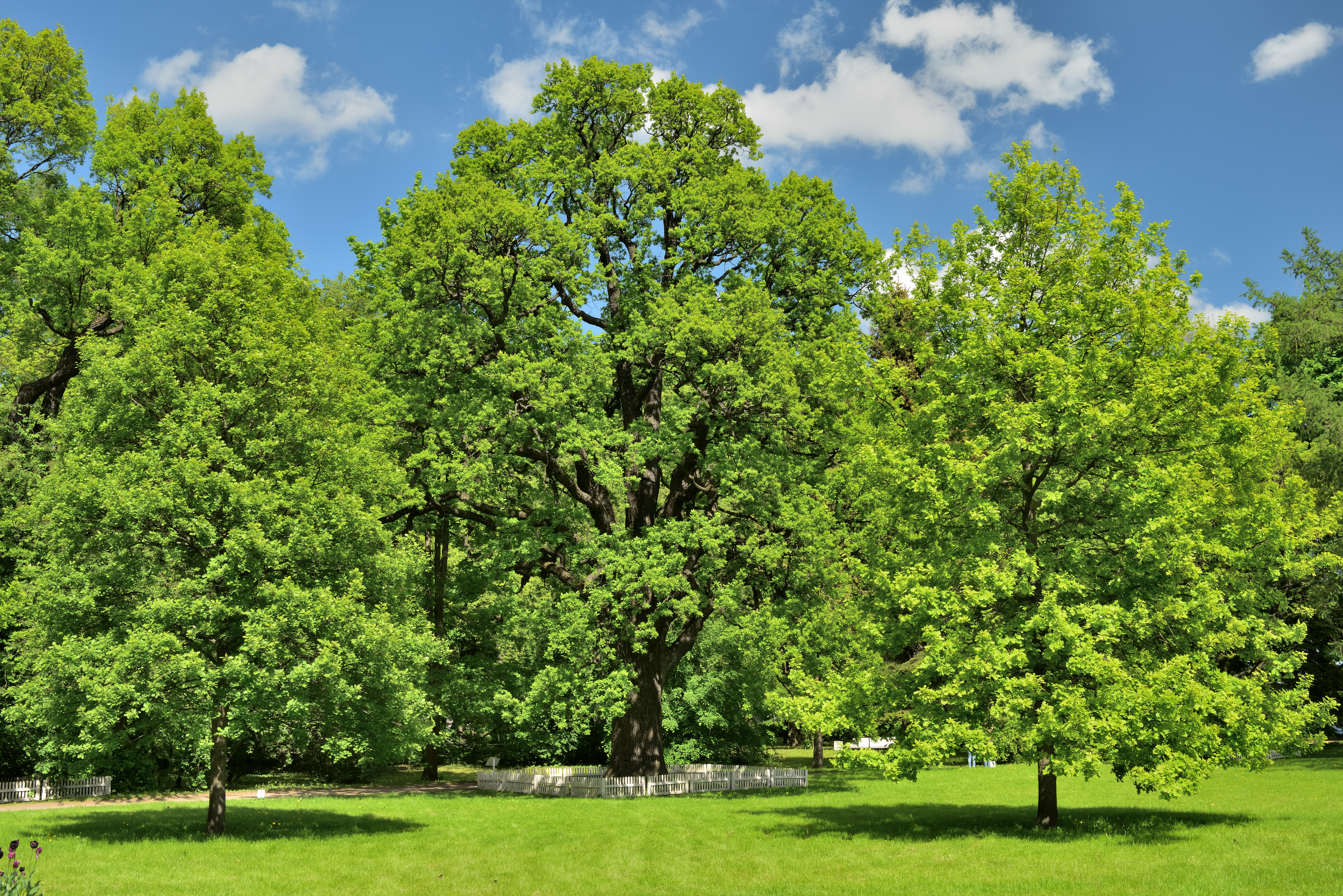
An old oak tree (in the center) surrounded by new plantings. The tree is about 300 years old.

== See also ==
- Kamenny Islands
