= Johann Georg Schwarz =

Russian academic & Freemason (1751–1784)

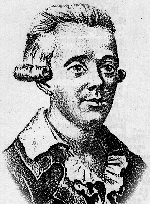

Johann Georg Schwarz (Russian: Иван Григорьевич Шварц, romanized: Ivan Grigoryevich Shvarts; 1751–1784) was a Russian philosopher and academic who served as a philosophy professor at Moscow University. He also headed the Russian branch of the Rosicrucian Society.

== Life ==
A Transylvanian Saxon, Schwarz settled in Moscow in 1776. He has been described as "the main carrier of esoterica into Russia" and an "emissary of Boehmist theosophy". He joined forces with Nikolay Novikov in founding the Society of Friendship, a bulwark of Russian Freemasonry that held secret meetings at the Menshikov Tower. Schwarz and Novikov moved the Masonic centre of Russia from St. Petersburg to Moscow, helping emancipate their compatriots from the Swedish Rite and Yelagin's antics.

Schwarz travelled in Europe to catch up with recent developments in the Rosicrucian doctrine. In 1782, he was present at the Wilhelmsbad masonic congress, where Russia was recognized as the eighth autonomous province of the Rite of Strict Observance. Paul of Russia also went to Europe at this time, raising Catherine II's suspicions about Paul's conversion to Freemasonry. Schwarz died soon after returning to Moscow at the age of 33.

== Sources ==
- "Шварц, Иван Григорьевич" . Brockhaus and Efron Encyclopedic Dictionary (in Russian). 1906.
