= History of Freemasonry in Russia =

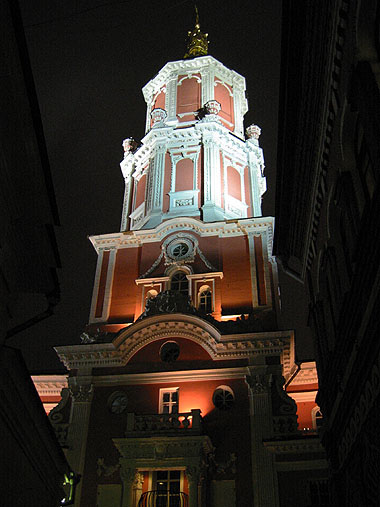
Menshikov Tower where the Masonic circle of Johann Georg Schwarz held its meetings

Freemasonry in Russia started in the 18th century and has continued to the present day. Russian Freemasonry pursue humanistic and educational purposes, but more attention is given to ethical issues. It was a spiritual community of people united in an effort to contribute to the prosperity of the Motherland and the enlightenment of the people living in it.

== History ==
Freemasonry was brought to Russia by foreign officers in service to the Russian military. Russian Freemasonry dates its foundation to the activities of Franz Lefort, Jacob Bruce and Patrick Gordon in the German Quarter of Moscow. James Keith is recorded as being master of a lodge in Saint Petersburg in 1732–34. Several years later, his cousin John Keith, 3rd Earl of Kintore was appointed provincial grand master of Russia by the Grand Lodge of England.

Catherine II's factotum Ivan Yelagin succeeded in reorganizing Russian Freemasonry into a far-reaching nationwide system that united some 14 lodges and about 400 government officials. He secured English authorization of the first Russian Grand Lodge and became its provincial grand master. He favoured an archaic ritual of blood initiation which involved a symbolic commingling of blood.

Yelagin's chief rival was George von Reichel from Braunschweig who championed a different system introduced by Johann Wilhelm Kellner von Zinnendorf, the grand master of the Grand Landlodge of the Freemasons of Germany. At least seven lodges founded in 1772-76 acknowledged Reichel's authority. The Yelagin-Reichel feud was ended in 1776 by the unification of all the Russian lodges under the auspices of the Minerva zu den drei Palmen Lodge in Berlin. The following year Gustav III of Sweden went to St. Petersburg to initiate Grand Duke Paul into Masonry.

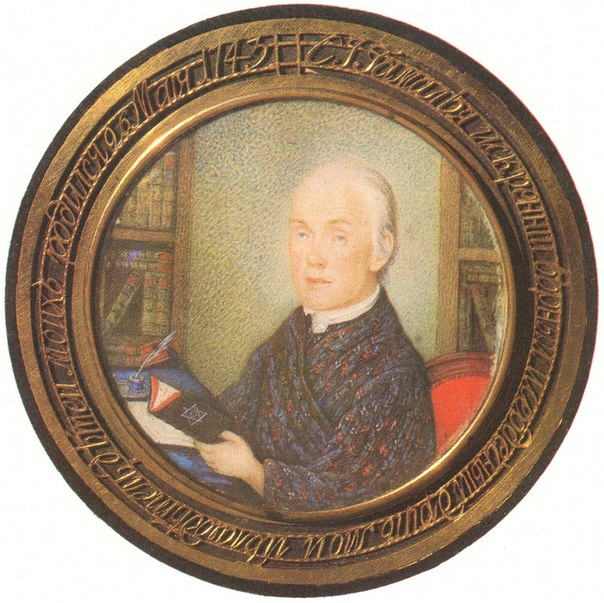
Semyon Gamaleya (1743-1822), a Freemason, was the first to translate into Russian the major works of Jakob Böhme.

In 1781, Nikolay Novikov and Ivan Schwarz, two professors of the Moscow University, set up the Learned Society of Friends in that city. They were dissatisfied with the Swedish Rite that was practised in St. Petersburg. Duke Ferdinand of Brunswick-Wolfenbüttel as the grand master of the lodges in Germany invited Schwarz to take part in the Wilhelmsbad Masonic Congress (1782) where Russia was recognized as the 8th autonomous province of the Rite of Strict Observance. A schism developed between the lodges of Moscow and St. Petersburg as the former drifted toward a form of Rosicrucianism.

Catherine the Great suspected the Masons of turning her son Paul against herself, of being a tool in the hands of her enemy King of Prussia, and viewed their attitude toward women as backwards. In 1785, she clamped down upon Novikov's printing house and had some 461 titles confiscated. When she saw her new palace in Tsaritsyno adorned with ornamentation suggestive of the cryptic symbols of Freemasonry, Catherine had it pulled down. Novikov was later jailed, and other leading Freemasons had to flee Russia.

Anti-Masonic measures were revoked as soon as Paul ascended the Russian throne in 1796. Increasingly haunted by the spectre of the French Revolution, Paul came to distrust Freemasonry and Martinism. Within three years of his reign all secret societies were suppressed, and the lodges closed of their own accord. Two years later Paul was assassinated. The lodges flourished under his successor Alexander I, although it remains unknown whether Alexander himself was an initiate. The most influential figure of this period was Alexander Labzin.

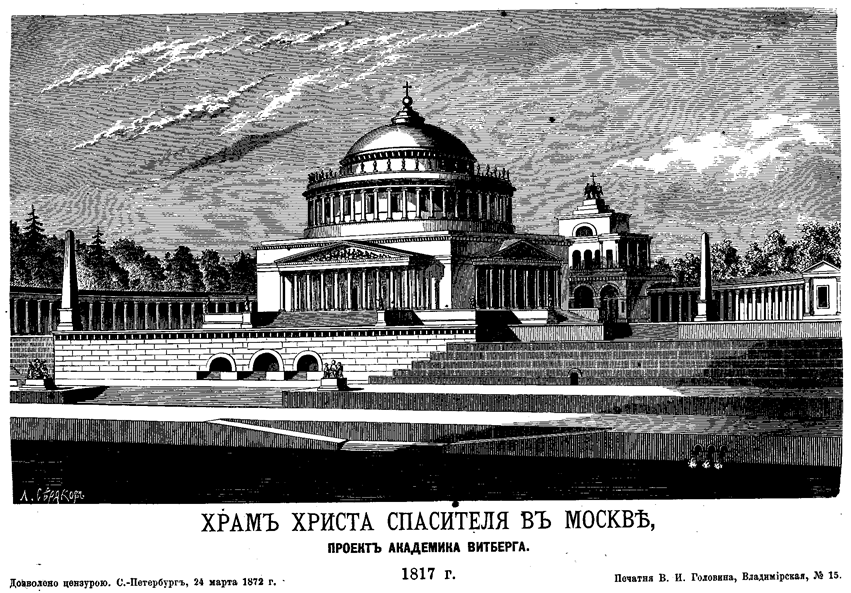
Aleksandr Vitberg's design for Cathedral of Christ the Saviour was suggestive of a Masonic temple.

The Grand Lodge Astraea was formed in 1815. It united nineteen smaller lodges and counted 1,404 members. Its rival was the Swedish Provincial Lodge of Russia, with seven smaller feuding lodges under its umbrella and 230 members. Leo Tolstoy describes some of the rituals in his novel War and Peace and mentions Fyodor Klyucharyov, a noted Masonic poet. According to Filipp Vigel, Freemasonry did little but to provide a fashionable pastime for bored nobles. As Emperor Alexander grew increasingly conservative, the Masonic-style political clubs were outlawed in 1822. This interdict was extended by Nicholas I in the wake of the Decembrist revolt, since the Decembrists had sprung from the Masonic lodges.

Freemasonry was legalized and enjoyed a brief revival after the Revolution of 1905. The Grand Orient of Russia's Peoples seceded from the Grand Orient de France, with Nikolai Vissarionovich Nekrasov and Alexander Kerensky as its main leaders. In 1922, in the wake of the October Revolution, the Bolsheviks had all the lodges closed.

=== Grand Lodge of Russia ===
In 1992 and 1993, on the territory of Russia, the Grande Loge Nationale Française, created the lodge: "Harmony" (Moscow), "Lotus" (Moscow), "New Astrea" (St. Petersburg), "Gamayun" (Voronezh).

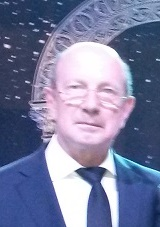
Georgiy Dergachev - First Grand Master of GLoR (1995-2002)

- Lodge "Harmony" was established on January 14, 1992, in Paris. This Lodge was created through the regularization of brothers from the lodge "Astrea» No. 100 GNLF.
- Lodge "New Astrea" was established on June 24, 1993, in St. Petersburg.
- The Voronezh-based lodge "Gamayun" was established on June 24, 1993, in St. Petersburg.
- Lodge "Lotus “ was established on October 12, 1993, in Moscow.

The Grand Lodge of Russia was established 24 June 1995 in Moscow. The founders of the Grand Lodge of Russia are made up by the Grande Loge Nationale Française and the four lodges previously created on the territory of Russia ("Harmony", "Lotus", "Astrea", "Gamayun"). The first Grand Master of the Grand Lodge of Russia, through election, was Georgiy Dergachev.

On the 2nd of July 2016, the GLoR counted near of 700 freemasons united over 33 Lodges. The current Grand Master of the GLoR is Andrei Vladimirovich Bogdanov.

The Grand Lodge of Russia is an integral part of most of the represented Masonic bodies in the world - the regular Freemasonry has mutual recognition with the United Grand Lodge of England (1996) and more than 100 Grand Lodges in the world.

=== United Grand Lodge of Russia ===
In March 2001, about 100 Freemasons left the Grand Lodge of Russia. The reason for the exit was: the disagreement of the brothers with the domestic policy pursued by the then leadership of Grand Lodge of Russia. From the three-volume book on the history of Russian Freemasonry in the 20th century by the historian of Freemasonry Andrey Serkov it follows that the following lodges have left: Harmony No. 1, Lotus No. 2, Astrea No. 3, Jupiter No. 7, Quatuor Coronati No. 8 and the Orion No. 15.

On April 16, 2001, a constituent assembly was held, after which it was announced the creation of the “Russian Grand Regular Lodge” (RGRL).

In 2007, after the GLR assembly, a group of Masons, members of the Harmony, Lotus, Phoenix, left GLR. After the release of the members of the GLR, they held a meeting with the members of the Russian Grand Regular Lodge, during which it was decided to unite and choose their name - the Grand Lodge of Russia. A clarification was added to the new name, led by the Grand Master A. S..

In June 2008, some members of the association decided to establish relations with the Grand Lodge of France.

On October 11, 2008, at its solemn assembly, under the patronage of the Grand Lodge of France, the United Grand Lodge of Russia (UGLR) was established. The United Grand Lodge of Russia was granted a patent of the Grand Lodge of France for the right to carry out work on the Ancient and Accepted Scottish Rite. The United Grand Lodge of Russia was included in the establishment of 11 lodges.

On the 2nd of July 2019, the UGLR counted near of 200 freemasons united over 11 Lodges. The current Grand Master of the UGLR is Yuri Arkhangelsky.

== Masonic organizations in Russia ==
- Grand Lodge of Russia - 700 members in 33 lodges;
- United Grand Lodge of Russia - 70 members in 5 lodges;
- Grand Orient of France - 100 members in 4 lodges;
- Grand Lodge of France - 10 members in 1 lodge;
- Women's Grand Lodge Of France - 30 sisters in 1 lodge;
- Le Droit Humain - 20 members in 1 lodges.

== See also ==
- History of Freemasonry
- List of Masonic Grand Lodges

== Bibliography ==
- Gould, Robert Freke (1887). Gould's History of Freemasonry Throughout the World, Volume III. Charles Scribner's Sons.
- Галахов А. Д. Обзор мистической литературы в царствование императора Александра I // Журнал министерства народного просвещения. 1875. No. 11. С. 94.
- Елагин И. П. Учение древнего любомудрия и богомудрия, или Наука свободных каменщиков; из разных творцов светских, духовных и мистических собранная и в 5 частях предложенная И. Е., великим российской провинциальной ложи мастером. Начато в 1786 г. Повесть о себе самом // Русский архив, 1864. — Вып. 1. — Стб. 93–110.
- Ешевский С. В. Московские масоны восьмидесятых годов прошедшего столетия (1780—1789) («Собрание Сочинений», т. III). М., 1870, 1900.
- Пыпин А. Н. Русское масонство в XVIII в. («Вестник Европы», 1867, No. 2); «Русское масонство до Новикова» (ib., 1868, No. 7); «Материалы для истории масонских лож» (ib., 1872, No. 7); «Очерки общественного движения при Александре I»
- Пекарский П. П. Дополнения к истории масонства в России XVIII столетия.
- Тукалевский В. Н. Искания русских масонов. СПб., 1911.
- Сочинения Лопухина: «Записки некоторых обстоятельств жизни и службы» (М., 1870 и Л., 1860); «Некоторые черты о внутренней церкви»; «Ό Ζηλοςοφος, искатель премудрости или духовный рыцарь»; «Излияние сердца, чувствующего благость единоначалия и ужасающегося, взирая на пагубные плоды и т. д.»
- Ковальков А. И. «Плод сердца, полюбившего истину, или собрание кратких рассуждений и т. д.» (М., 1811), «Созидание церкви внутренней и царства света Божия»; «Мысли о мистике и ее писателях»; «Масонские воспоминания Батенкова».
- Аржанухин С. В. Философские и общественно-политические взгляды русских масонов второй половины XVIII- первой четверти XIX вв. Дисс. на соиск. ... д-ра филос. наук. Екатеринбург, 1996. 398 с.
- Джейкоб М. К. Масонство // Мир Просвещения. Исторический словарь
- Захаров В. Ю. Основные этапы развития масонства в России, его соотношение с конституционализмом http://www.zpu-journal.ru/e-zpu/2008/6/Zakharov_masonry/ Электронный журнал «Знание. Понимание. Умение» 2008
- Воспоминания о московском масонстве XVIII века. Перевод с немецкой рукописи / Перевод О. Балашовой // Русский архив, 1874. — Кн. 1. — Вып. 4. — Стб. 1031—1042. — Под загл.: Письмо неизвестного лица о московском масонстве XVIII века.
- Екатерина II. О видах добра (переписка с гр. А. С. Строгановым) // Русский архив, 1863. — Вып. 5/6. — Стб. 587—590. Archived 2013-12-27 at the Wayback Machine
- Ильин А. Я. Из дневника масона. 1775—1776 гг. // Чтения в Императорском Обществе истории и древностей российских (ЧОИДР), 1908. — Кн. 4. — Отд. 4. — С. 1–15.
- А. Ф. Керенский о деятельности российского масонства
- Кучурин В. В. Мистицизм и западноевропейский эзотеризм в религиозной жизни русского дворянства
- Масонство и русская литература XVIII - начала XIX вв. / Под редакцией В.И. Сахарова. — М., Эдиториал УРСС, 2000.
- Martin A. M. From the Holy Roman Empire to the Land of the Tsars: One Family’s Odyssey, 1768-1870 Oxford, 2022.
- Морамарко Микеле Масонство в прошлом и настоящем Michele Moramarko La Massoneria ieri e oggi Пер. с итал. В. П. Гайдука; Вступит. ст. В. И. Уколовой Прогресс, 1990, 304 pages
- Надгробная песнь масонов / Сообщ. Н. А. Боровков // Русская старина, 1898. — Т. 95. — No. 8. — С. 268.
- Незеленов А. И. Николай Иванович Новиков, издатель журналов 1769–1785 гг. — Репринтное воспроизведение издания 1875 г. — СПб.: Альфарет, 2009. — 470 с.
- Пятигорский А. М. Кто боится вольных каменщиков? Феномен масонства (Who's Afraid of Freemasons? Phenomenon of Freemasonry) перевод с англ. К. Боголюбова. Под общ. ред. К. Кобрина, Новое литературное обозрение, 2009, 448, Интеллектуальная история, ISBN 978-5-86793-663-1
- Сахаров В. Чаяния ветхого Адама. Человек в философии русских масонов
- Сахаров В. Царство Астреи. Миф о Золотом веке в русской масонской литературе XVIII столетия
- Серков А. И. История русского масонства 1845 - 1945. — СПб.: Изд-во им. Н. И. Новикова, 1997. — 480 с. ISBN 5-87991-015-6
- Серков А. И. История русского масонства после Второй мировой войны. — СПб.: Изд-во им. Н. И. Новикова, 1999. — 445 с. ISBN 5-87991-016-4
- Серков А. И. История русского масонства XIX века. — СПб.: Изд-во им. Н. И. Новикова, 2000. — 400 с. ISBN 5-87991-017-2
- Серков А. И. Русское масонство. 1731-2000 (Энциклопедический словарь) — М.: РОССПЭН, 2001. — 1224 с., илл. ISBN 5-8243-0240-5
- Смит Д. Работа над диким камнем: Масонский орден и русское общество в XVIII веке Douglas Smith. Working the Rough Stone: Freemasonry and Society in Eighteenth-Century Russia. 1999, Авторизованный перевод с англ. К. Осповата и Д. Хитровой, Новое литературное обозрение, 2006, 224р., Historia Rossica, ISBN 5-86793-478-0
- Соколовская Т. О. Русское масонство и его значение в истории общественного движения (XVIII и первая четверть XIX столетия) / Государственная публичная историческая библиотека России. — М.: ГПИБ, 1999.
- Соколовская Т. О. Статьи по истории русского масонства / Государственная публичная историческая библиотека России. — М.: ГПИБ, 2008. — 340 с. — 500 экз. — ISBN 5-85209-209-6
- Степанов А. П. Принятие в масоны в 1815 году / Сообщ. П. А. Степанов Archived 2016-03-05 at the Wayback Machine // Русская старина, 1870. — Т. 1. — Изд. 3-е. — Спб., 1875. — С. 223–229.
- Исторический союз русских лож: Сборник статей и документов / Редактор-составитель С. Ю. Иванов. — СПб.: АИР. 2011. — 520 с. — ISBN 5-9902797-1-X; ISBN 978-5-9902797-1-1.
