= Ivan Yelagin =

Russian historian and poet (1725–1794)

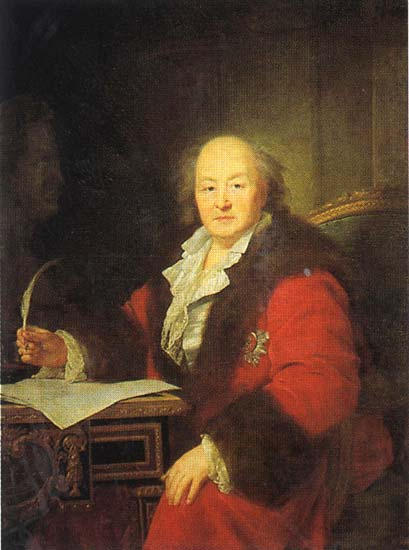
Portrait by Jean-Louis Voille

Ivan Perfilievich Yelagin (Russian: Иван Перфильевич Елагин; 1725–1794) was a Russian historian, amateur poet, and translator who acted as unofficial secretary to Catherine the Great in the early years of her reign.

== Life ==
Yelagin studied in the cadet corps for nobles with Mikhail Kheraskov and Alexander Sumarokov, a popular playwright whose works he alternately praised and derided. He became Catherine's ally when she was Grand Duchess at the court of Empress Elisabeth. In 1758, the Empress banished him from the court for his close ties to the disgraced chancellor Bestuzhev.

After Catherine's coming to power in 1762, Yelagin replaced Sumarokov as director of the court theatres. His dominion over the Russian theatre was described as tyrannical: for instance, Yelagin demanded that comedies and other foreign plays were transposed to Russian settings. He also helped Catherine in re-editing her manuscripts: all her literary works survive only in Yelagin's handwritten copies.

"There were few social activities in which he did not involve himself", as historians have noted. "With Dr Ely, a converted Jew and a mason, Yelagin studied Hebrew and Cabbala, theosophy, physics and chemistry, Egyptian traditions". He entertained Count Cagliostro in his house and is mentioned in Casanova's memoirs. Yelagin is probably best remembered as a founding father of the Russian freemasonry. This side of his activities eventually aroused Catherine's suspicions and contributed to his downfall in the early 1780s.

Yelagin's sumptuous villa on the eponymous isle to the north of St. Petersburg was later rebuilt into an imperial residence (see Yelagin Palace).

== See also ==
- Grigory Teplov – a similar figure

== Sources ==
- "Елагин, Иван Перфильевич" . Brockhaus and Efron Encyclopedic Dictionary (in Russian). 1906.
