= Grand Lodge of Russia =

Freemason organisation

- Established: 24 June 1995
- Location: Russia
- Grand Master: Andrei Vladimirovich Bogdanov
- Website: Grand Lodge of Russia

The Grand Lodge of Russia (GLoR) (Russian: Великая ложа России) is the Regular Masonic jurisdiction for Russia. The Grand Lodge was established on 24 June 1995. It was the first national grand lodge to be created in the country after the closure of the original Russian grand lodges in 1922 by the Bolsheviks. The Grand Lodge of Russia has jurisdiction across the entire nation, and enjoys mutual recognition with most of the regular Grand Lodges worldwide, including the three senior or "home" Grand Lodges, namely the United Grand Lodge of England (recognition in 1996), the Grand Lodge of Ireland, and the Grand Lodge of Scotland; more than 100 other Grand Lodges in the world also exchange recognition.

In July 2016 the GLoR reported over 700 members, in more than 33 Lodges nationwide. The current Grand Master of the GLoR is Andrei Vladimirovich Bogdanov.

== History ==
The re-introduction of Freemasonry into Russia began in the early 1990s, after the fall of the USSR. In 1992 and 1993 the Grande Loge Nationale Française (GLNF) consecrated four lodges: Harmony Lodge (Moscow), Lotus Lodge (Moscow), New Astrea Lodge (St. Petersburg), and Gamayun Lodge (Voronezh).

Harmony Lodge was established on 14 January 1992 in Paris. The lodge then relocated to Moscow. Subsequently, New Astrea Lodge was established on St John's Day, 24 June 1993, in St. Petersburg. The Voronezh-based Gamayun Lodge was established on 24 June 1993 in St. Petersburg. Lotus Lodge was established on 12 October 1993 in Moscow.

These four lodges became the founders of the Grand Lodge of Russia on St John's Day, 24 June 1995, in a consecration ceremony performed in Moscow. The consecration was performed by the GLNF, with the support of other regular masonic authorities, including the United Grand Lodge of England (UGLE), who extended official recognition to the new Russian body within its first year of operation. The first Grand Master of the Grand Lodge of Russia was Georgiy Dergachev.

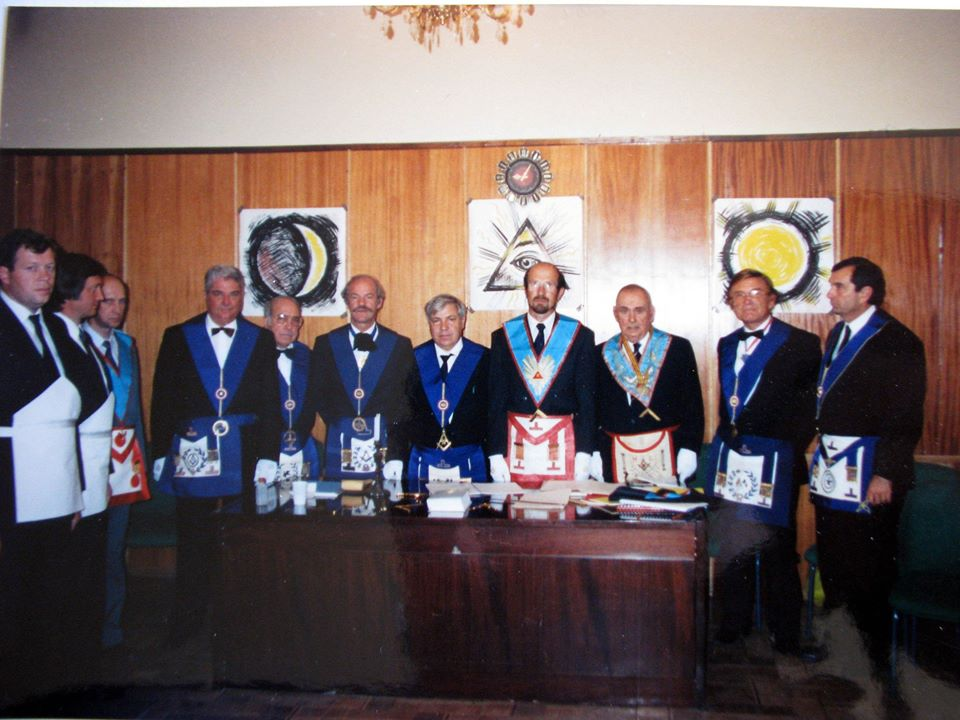
The first works of the lodge "Harmony" No. 698 GLNF in Moscow, September 7, 1992

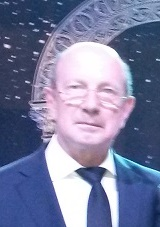
Georgiy Dergachev, first Grand Master (1995-2002)

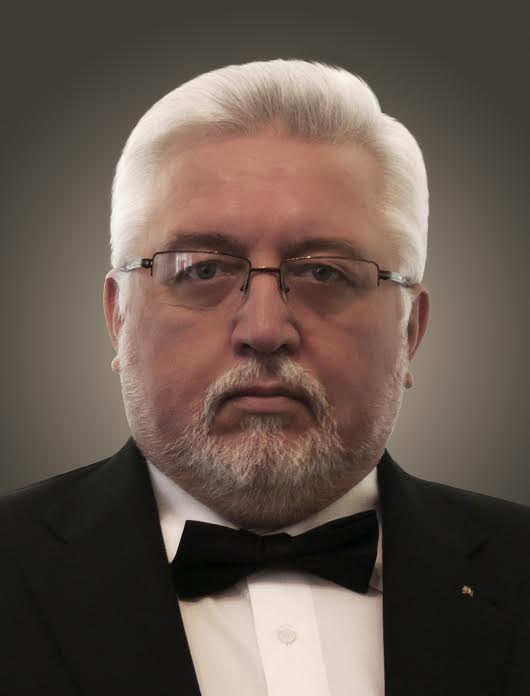
Deputy Grand Master of GLR - Viktor Belyavsky

== Jurisdiction ==
The GLoR currently has lodges in cities across Russia and in some neighbouring states, including Moscow, Saint Petersburg, Yekaterinburg, Kaliningrad, Voronezh, Saransk, Shakhty, Kazan, Krasnodar, Sochi, Perm, Minsk, Nizhny Novgorod.

In some cities, such as St. Petersburg and Yekaterinburg, two lodges operate. Some single-lodge cities are planning expansion to a second lodge. In Moscow there are currently 16 active lodges.

In early 2013 the Caucasus District of the GLoR was established, which consisted of two lodges, one in Georgia and one in Abkhazia. On 14 March 2015 the Caucasus District, with headquarters in Tbilisi, was consecrated as an independent Grand Lodge of Georgia. The ceremony was performed by the Grand Lodge of Russia.

On 12 November 2016, the GLoR lodges in Kazakhstan (Alikhan Bukeikhanov Lodge, Almaty; Light of the East Lodge, Almaty; and United Nomadic Brothers Lodge, Almaty (English Speaking)) were formed into the independent Grand Lodge of Kazakhstan. The new Grand Lodges of Georgia and Kazakhstan have not yet met with international recognition.

== Lodges ==
  1. 1 Harmony Lodge, Moscow
  2. 2/10 Lotus/Brotherly Love Lodge, Moscow
- #3 Astrea Lodge, St. Petersburg
  1. 5 Aurora Lodge, Moscow (English language)
- #6 Pole Star Lodge, Moscow
- #7 Jupiter Lodge, Moscow
- #8 Quatuor Coronati Lodge, Moscow (research lodge)
- #9 Northern Lights Lodge, Moscow
  1. 11 Alexander Pushkin Lodge, Moscow
  2. 15 Orion Lodge, Moscow
  3. 16 Phoenix Lodge, Moscow
- #23 Alpha and Omega Lodge, Minsk, Belarus, District Belarus
- #25 White Knight Lodge, Minsk, Belarus, District Belarus
  1. 27 Citadel Lodge, Moscow
- #29 Acacia Lodge, Sochi
- #31 Stone Belt Lodge, Yekaterinburg
  1. 32 France Lodge, Moscow
  2. 33 Muse Lodge, St. Petersburg
- #34 Completely Agree Lodge, Moscow (French language)
  1. 35 Delta Lodge, Krasnodar
- #36 Fyodor Ushakov Lodge, Saransk
- #37 Clio Lodge, Moscow
- #38 Two Eagles Lodge, Moscow/Minsk, District Belarus
- #42 Araragat Lodge, Moscow (Armenian language)
- #43 Pavel Pavlovich Demidov Lodge, Yekaterinburg
  1. 44 Golden Key Lodge, Perm
  2. 45 Aleksander Griboyedov Lodge, St. Petersburg
- #46 Skull and Cross Lodge, Nizhny Novgorod
- #49 Giuseppe Garibaldi Lodge, Moscow
  1. 50 Shipka Lodge, Moscow (Bulgarian language)
- #53 Konkordia Lodge, Shakhty
- #54 Rising Sun Lodge, Kazan

== Rites ==
The lodges of the GLoR work a variety of different Masonic rites, including:

- Scottish Rite
- French Rite
- Emulation Rite
- East Rite
- From 2006 to 2010, the Lodge "Holy Grail" has worked on the Zinnendorf Rite.

== See also ==
- History of Freemasonry in Russia
- History of Freemasonry
- List of Masonic Grand Lodges
