= Alexander Labzin =

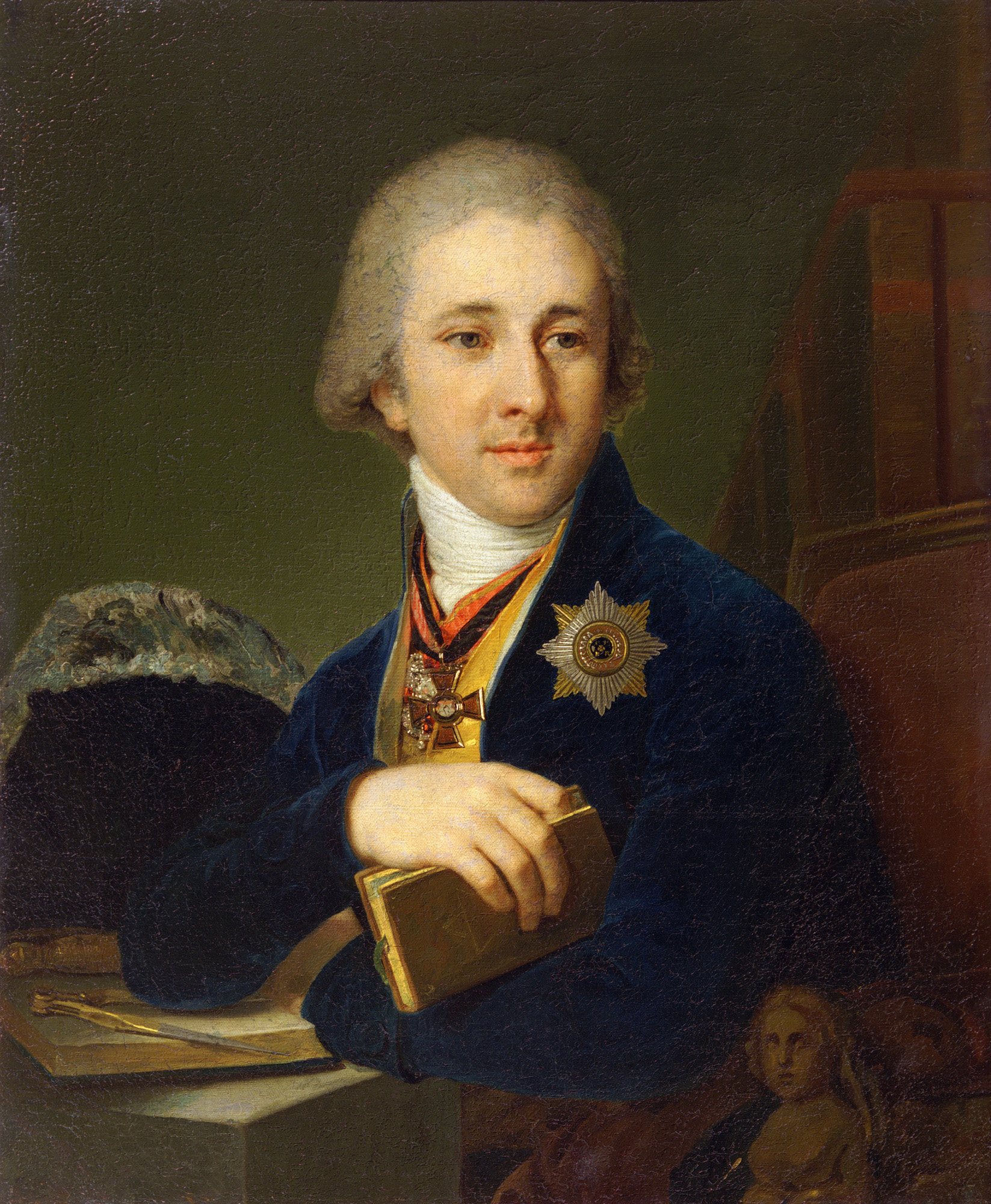
Portrait by Vladimir Borovikovsky, 1805

Alexander Fyodorovich Labzin (Александр Фёдорович Лабзин; 1766–1825) was a leading figure of the Russian Enlightenment who developed an idiosyncratic mystical system and founded an influential St. Petersburg masonic lodge, The Dying Sphinx. His wife Anna Labzina was a noted memoirist.

Labzin attended the Moscow University, where he came to know two leading Freemasons, Ivan Schwarz and Nikolay Novikov. He curried favour with Emperor Paul by preparing a historical account of the Order of Malta and held a string of offices during his reign and that of his son, including Chief of the Navy Department and Vice President of the Imperial Academy of Arts. He also had time to translate Jakob Böhme and Pierre Beaumarchais, as well as write his own poetry.

Labzin revived the tradition of Novikov's "libertine" magazines with "The Messenger of Sion", a religious monthly that celebrated a "religion of the heart" and rebelled against the ritualistic side of Orthodox worship. The magazine was attacked by the church officials led by Archimandrite Photius and was discontinued.

In 1822 he was exiled to Simbirsk for opposing Arakcheyev's election to the Academy of Arts. When told that Arakcheyev was "the nearest person to His Majesty", Labzin proposed to elect the Tsar's coachman instead "not only as being the nearest to the emperor, but having a seat before his majesty". He died in exile.

Labzin's young protégés included Alexander Witberg, an architect who won the commission to construct in Moscow the Cathedral of Christ the Saviour but tsar Nicholas I abandoned the "Masonic" plan for a less "Roman Catholic" neo-Byzantine construction.
