= Icelandic Order of Freemasons =

Fraternal order of freemasonry in Iceland

The Grand Lodge of Iceland The Icelandic Order of Freemasons
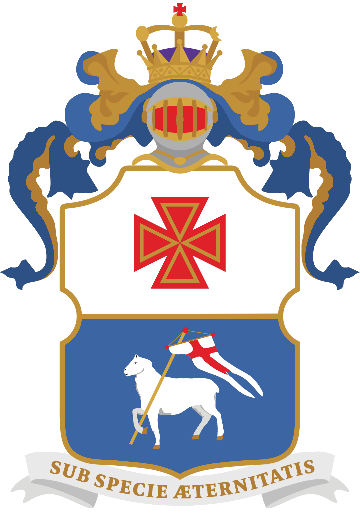
- Coat of arms of the Grand Lodge of Iceland / the Icelandic Order of Freemasons
- Established: July 23, 1951
- Location: Iceland; Headquarters: Masonic Temple Bríetartún 3 105, Reykjavik
- Coordinates: Headquarters: 64°8′40.18″N 21°54′45.96″W
- Region: Iceland
- Website: www.frimurarareglan.is/]

The Icelandic Order of Freemasons (Icelandic: Frímúrarareglan á Íslandi) (abbr.: FaI), in English also known as the Grand Lodge of Iceland, is the governing body of regular Freemasonry in Iceland.

The history of Freemasonry in Iceland began when a "society of brothers“, Edda, was established in the Icelandic capital of Reykjavik in 1913. Edda became a lodge of instruction in 1918. The following year, on January 6, 1919, it became a fully warranted lodge. Since 1919, there have been a total of twelve warranted lodges and six lodges of instruction established in Iceland. Membership in the Order was at 3,379 as of March 15, 2011

Icelandic Freemasonry was under the jurisdiction of the Danish Order of Freemasons (Danish: Den Danske Frimurerorden) until 1951 when the Grandlodge of Denmark constituted the Grand Lodge of Iceland as a sovereign Order.

Icelandic Freemasonry operates according to the Swedish Rite which is the dominant system in Scandinavia. Unlike other forms of Freemasonry, the Swedish Rite consists of eleven degrees, all of which are recognized by regular Freemasonry. As part of the Swedish Rite, the Icelandic Order of Freemasons requires its members to profess a belief in Christianity. The Order additionally requires its members to be over the age of twenty-one, to have a clean criminal record, and to have received the sponsorship of at least two members of the Order.

There are 18 lodges in Iceland.

== Notable Members ==
- Ásgeir Ásgeirsson - second President of Iceland, Grandmaster
- Sveinn Björnsson - Regent and first President of Iceland, Grandmaster.
- Vilhjálmur Þór - Minister of Foreign Affairs of Iceland, Manager of the Central Bank of Iceland.
- Magnús Jónsson - Minister of Finance of Iceland.
- Ludvig Kaaber - Businessman, Grandmaster

== See also ==
- Freemasonry in Iceland
- Danish Order of Freemasons
- Norwegian Order of Freemasons
- Swedish Order of Freemasons
- Swedish Rite
