= St. Andrew Lodge Oscar to the Burning Star =

Masonic lodge

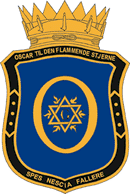
The coat of arms of Lodge Oscar til den flammende Stjerne

The St. Andrew lodge Oscar to the burning star (Norwegian: Oscar til den flammende Stjerne) is a Freemasonic Lodge within the Norwegian Order of Freemasons (Lodge of St. Andrew no. 1).

The lodge was founded in Drammen in 1826 as a Craft lodge, practising the three degrees of St. John. After having delivered an application to the Swedish Grand Lodge, it was moved to Christiana and elevated into a St. Andrew lodge practising the Scottish degrees of St. Andrew (IV°-VI°) of the Swedish Rite. The Act of capitulation as a lodge of St. John was formulated on 10 April 1836. Its constituting patent as a lodge of St. Andrew was then worked out on 10 April 1841.

The lodge was one of six founding lodges, establishing the Norwegian Order of Freemasons on 24 June 1891.
