= Bjarne Keyser Barth =

Norwegian Army officer (1892–1972)

- Born: 14 April 1892; Kristiania, Norway
- Died: 23 April 1972 (aged 80)
- Burial place: Vestre Aker Cemetery, Oslo, Norway
- Spouses: Madelaine Marie Quernel (m. 1922) (marriage dissolved) Solveig Elfrida Bjørnstad (m. 1926)
- Relatives: Christian Andreas Barth (father); Marie Georgine Antoinette Keyser (mother)
- Military career
- Allegiance: Norway
- Branch: Norwegian Army
- Service years: 1914–1952
- Rank: Captain
- Units: Oscarsborg Fortress (1914–1917); 2nd Fortress Company (1917–1919, 1920–1926); Tønsberg Fortifications (1919–1920); Agdenes Fortress (1926–1930); Fossumstrøket Fortress (1930–1940, 1945–1952)
- Commands: 16th Fortress Company (1926–1930); Høytorp Fort (1940)
- Conflicts: Norwegian Campaign (1940)
- Awards: Swedish Magersfontein Memorial Medal; Defence Medal 1940–1945; Silver medal of the Det frivillige Skyttervesen
- Other work: Journalist; Magazine editor; Business owner

Bjarne Keyser Barth (14 April 1892 – 23 April 1972) was a Norwegian fortress artillery officer. A military officer from 1914, Barth took part in Norwegian neutrality protection duties during the First World War, mostly at Oscarsborg Fortress. Remaining in military service after the end of the First World War, he served at several different Norwegian fortresses, finally at Fossumstrøket Fortress in south-eastern Norway.

In the inter-war years, Barth continued his military career, as well as working as a journalist, schoolteacher and book editor, and ran a small business.

During the Second World War, Barth again took part in neutrality protection duties, until the German invasion of Norway in April 1940. Barth led the garrison of Høytorp Fort, which fought the German invasion forces before being encircled and surrendering. Close to two years later, in 1942, Barth was arrested by the German occupying authorities and sent as a prisoner of war to Germany.

In the post-war years, Barth was involved with officer associations, and edited several military professional magazines. In this role he was often critical of the political leadership of the Norwegian Armed Forces.

== Early and personal life ==
Barth was born in Kristiania on 14 April 1892 to bank manager Christian Andreas Barth and Marie Georgine Antoinette Keyser. Having attended Oslo Cathedral School, he achieved his Examen artium student qualifications in 1910.

He first married Frenchwoman Madelaine Marie Quernel in Paris on 6 July 1922, having had wedding celebrations at the Hôtel Lutetia the day before. The couple had a son, born in Bordeaux in April 1923. The marriage was later dissolved. He remarried to Solveig Elfrida Bjørnstad in Oslo, Norway, on 26 June 1926. Barth and his second wife had two sons together, the first born in Oslo in October 1931 and the second born in October 1936.

Barth was a freemason, having joined the Lodge St. Olaus to the white Leopard in January 1917.

== Career ==
He graduated as military officer from the Norwegian Military Academy in 1914, becoming a first lieutenant in the Fortress Artillery on 13 October 1914. He then graduated from the Norwegian Military College in 1919. During the First World War he saw service on neutrality protection duties, serving from 1914 to 1917 at Oscarsborg Fortress in the Oslofjord, then from 1917 to 1919 with the 2nd Fortress Company. In 1919 to 1920 he served at Tønsberg Fortifications, before returning to the 2nd Fortress Company in 1920 and staying with that unit until 16 November 1926, when he was promoted to the rank of captain and transferred to Agdenes Fortress in the Trondheimsfjord. With his transfer to Agdenes he assumed command of the 16th Fortress Company. In 1930 he again transferred, this time to Fossumstrøket Fortress in the south-east of Norway. In connection with his military service he travelled to France for studies in 1921–1922, serving with the French Army's 157th Artillery Regiment and attending a French artillery school in Mailly. In 1924, 1927 and 1930 he again travelled in Europe for studies, visiting France, Italy and Germany. From 1935 to 1946 Barth was a member of the board of the Norwegian Army Regular Officers' Association.

In addition to his military service, Barth had several civilian occupations. From 1920 to 1921 he worked as a schoolteacher, at a primary school in Kristiania and at his old secondary school Oslo Cathedral School. He also worked as chief of advertising at the advertising agency Høydahl Ohme. Starting in 1924, he ran an agency business in Oslo. From 1924 to 1928 he worked as journalist, and was then working as a procurator at the finance magazine Økonomisk Revue from 1928 to 1942. He edited the book Norges militære embedsmenn 1929 with biographies of Norwegian regular military officers, published in 1930. In 1924 he was the secretary of the Norwegian memorial committee for the Scandinavian Corps and the Battle of Magersfontein during the Second Boer War. In connection with his work on the committee, he was awarded the Swedish Magersfontein Memorial Medal.

=== Second World War ===
After the outbreak of the Second World War, Barth was mobilized on 22 January 1940 for neutrality protection duties at Høytorp Fort, one of the forts belonging to Fossumstrøket Fortress. At Fossumstrøket Fortress he was the designated substitute for the fortress commander, Lieutenant Colonel Lauritz Rodtwitt, in cases where the commander was absent.

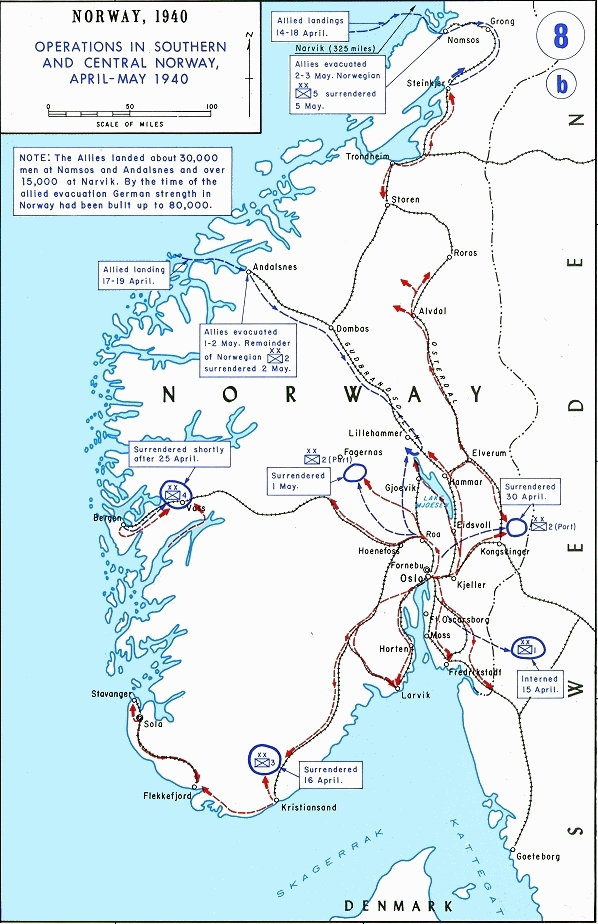
Map of the Norwegian Campaign in the southern part of Norway, with the operations around Fossumstrøket Fortress occurring in the far south-east

When the Germans invaded Norway on 9 April 1940, Barth was in command of Fossumstrøket Fortress' signals unit. Fossumstrøket Fortress' two forts immediately began mobilizing, although at Høytorp Fort this was hampered by ill-maintained and outdated fortifications and the poor quality of the other facilities. During the decade before 1940 the role of Høytorp Fort had been changed to one as a mobilization area for field artillery rather than a defensible fortification. At Trøgstad Fort artillery ammunition was in very short supply. Captain Barth was placed in charge of Høytorp Fort, and took direct command of the fort's two 12 cm turreted artillery pieces. After their initial landings along the coast, the Germans began their inland advance. The 196th Infantry Division was tasked with seizing the far south-east corner of Norway, including the Fossum area. The unit began its advance from Oslo on 12 April 1940. When one of the advance columns of the 196th Infantry Division reached the Askim area on 13 April, the cannon at Høytorp Fort opened fire to cover the retreat of the Norwegian 1st Division. In the course of two hours a total of 100 high-explosive shells were fired from the fort in an indirect area bombardment without the aid of observers. The artillery fire was estimated by the Norwegians as having been reasonably effective. Having expended their stocks of artillery ammunition, the fort's crew redeployed for defence of the interior of the fort. In a post-action report, Barth praised the crew of Høytorp Fort for their "fire discipline and good attitude in action". On 14 April 1940 Fossumstrøket Fortress surrendered after a meeting of the fortress commander and six of the other officers, including Captain Barth. The officers held a vote and unanimously agreed that the fortress could not continue fighting. At the time the fortress was encircled and under machine gun and artillery fire, while the Norwegian 1st Division had retreated from the area and no longer needed the fortress' support. Barth stated in connection with his vote that the fortress was in an impossible tactical situation, and was manned by poorly trained and demoralized crews. Barth and another officer were appointed to approach the German forces and begin surrender negotiations on behalf of the fortress commander. The fortress guns were rendered inoperable by the destruction of vital parts at 14:05, and a flag of truce was raised over the fortress at 14:16. In a report written in 1941, Lieutenant Colonel Rodtwitt praised Barth's efforts during the fighting, describing him as "loyal, devoted to duty, able and brave", pointing especially to his leadership of Høytorp Fort during the fighting and to his "rescue of important documents" after the surrender of the fortress. Rodtwitt concluded his report by stating that under "normal circumstances" (rather than Norway being occupied) he would have recommended Barth for a promotion and an award.

Barth was arrested by the Gestapo on 12 January 1942, held at the Grini detention camp from the day of his arrest. At Grini he was assigned prisoner number 1234. He was transferred as a prisoner of war to the officers' camp Oflag XXI-C in Skoki in German-annexed Poland on 5 February 1942. At Oflag XXI-C Barth was prisoner number 22, as one of the first officers to have been sent to the camp. (Note: In total some 1,300 Norwegian officers were arrested by the Germans and sent as prisoners of war to Oflag XXI-C, most being detained in August 1943. The Germans carried out mass arrests after learning that a number of the officers had been amongst the leadership of the Norwegian resistance movement, and that other officers had escaped occupied Norway to join the exiled Norwegian forces fighting from abroad.) He was released from captivity on 28 September 1942, due to having fallen severely ill during his captivity. For his wartime service, Barth was decorated with the Defence Medal 1940–1945. In addition he had the Det frivillige Skyttervesen rifle association's silver medal.

=== Post-war years ===
In the post-war years, Barth edited the periodical Vår Hær from 1946 to 1964, and Norges Forsvar from 1964 to 1966. Vår Hær was published by the Norwegian Army Regular Officers' Association and spoke on behalf of the association's members, while Norges Forsvar was and still is the magazine of the Norges Forsvarsforening (Norwegian Defence Association). In a 1946 leader, Vår Hær criticized the Norwegian Minister of Defence, Jens Christian Hauge and demanded his resignation. The resignation demand, which included claims that Hauge had ignored the advice of military professionals and involved himself too much in the details of military matters in the post-war reconstruction of the Norwegian Armed Forces, led to a debate in the national newspapers. Barth stated in the debate that "most army officers" would agree with the criticism of Hauge. In the debate Barth was himself criticised by the Norwegian Army Officers' Association which said it was too soon to judge minister Hauge's efforts, and that Barth's statements were too broad in nature. In the following years criticism of defence minister Hauge leadership increased among officers, media and politicians, and ended with Hauge announcing his resignation in late 1951. Barth wrote an editorial in Vår Hær after Hauge's resignation where he stated that in his view the defence minister had had "increasingly dictatorial tendencies over the years" and "lacked an ability to cooperate".

Barth was given an honourable discharge from the Norwegian Armed Forces on 15 April 1952. His last military position was at Fossumstrøket Fortress. Barth had applied unsuccessfully for several positions during his last seven years in the Norwegian Armed Forces, the first of his post-war applications being to the position of general inspector and commander of the Norwegian coastal artillery service in 1945. In 1946, the officer appointed to the position for which Barth had applied the previous year, Colonel Gunnar Isaachsen Willoch, recommended that Barth should be promoted to the rank of colonel and given command of the coastal artillery in Western Norway. However, due to a bureaucratic mistake Barth was considered by the Commanding Admiral of the Royal Norwegian Navy, Admiral Elias Corneliussen, to be disqualified due to his age and another officer given the position. Admiral Corneliussen and army general Halvor Hansson had interpreted the age regulations for promotion to the rank of colonel without taking into account Barth's war service, which would have enabled him to be qualified for a promotion despite his age. Barth sent a written complaint after being disqualified. A parliamentary investigative commission concluded months later that Barth had been qualified for the position, and should be considered for other similar positions. Barth's case was brought up at the Storting (Parliament of Norway) in 1948 by Conservative Party politician Carl P. Wright, who stated that Barth should be given the next coastal artillery position that became available. Minister of Defence Jens Christian Hauge replied to Wright's statement by pointing out that Barth had been removed from consideration quite early in the process in 1946 due to the mistake made regarding age limits, but that he was now free to apply for and be considered for any military position. Wright brought up once more the cases of Barth and several other officers who claimed to have been unreasonably bypassed, in 1949. In 1948 Barth applied unsuccessfully for the position of commander of Coastal Artillery Brigade Eastern Norway. The next year he applied unsuccessfully for the position of director of the Norwegian Defence University College, and also for the position as military attaché at the Norwegian embassies in Copenhagen and Stockholm. He died on 23 April 1972 at the age of 80, having lived at Akersborg terrasse in Oslo. He was buried on 5 June 1972 at Vestre Aker Cemetery in Oslo.
