= Freemasonry in Denmark =

Freemasonry in Denmark was first established in 1743 and is today represented by a number of Grand Lodges. The oldest and biggest Masonic Grand Lodge in Denmark is the Danish Order of Freemasons (Danish: Den Danske Frimurerorden), in English also known as the Grand Lodge of Denmark.

== History ==
Freemasonry came to Denmark in 1743 with the founding of the Lodge of St. Martin. Named after Martin of Tours, the Lodge was founded in Copenhagen by several Danish Masons, who were also members of Grand Lodges abroad. 1745 saw the founding of Denmark's second Lodge, Zorobabel, also in Copenhagen. From Copenhagen, Freemasonry began to spread throughout the Kingdom of Denmark-Norway with the founding in 1749 of the Lodge St. Olai in Oslo as well as Lodges in Bergen and Trondheim. In 1767 St. Martin and Zorobabel merged to form Zorobabel til Nordstjernen. This Lodge took over St. Martin's role as Mother Lodge to the Freemasons' Lodges in Norway.

In 1855 Zorobabel til Nordstjernen merged with the Lodge of Friedrich zur Gekrönten Hoffnung (founded in 1778) to form the Lodge of Zorobabel og Frederik til det kronede Haab (Z & F for short).

This happened less than a year after the founding of St. Martin, on June 3d 1744. At that time, the Freemasons decided not to publish a public registry of members and to keep the minutes of the Lodge a secret. The kings successor to the throne, Christian VII of Denmark had met several Freemasons on his Grand Tour of Europe during the 1760s, including Benjamin Franklin in London and Jean le Rond d'Alembert, Denis Diderot, Claude Adrien Helvétius and Baron d'Holbach in Paris. Although wanting to become a Mason himself, his deteriorated mental health meant that he was never initiated. Many of his successors however were Freemasons and held the title of Viseste Salomo Vicarius or Grand Master: Frederik VII of Denmark, Frederik VIII of Denmark and Christian X of Denmark.

Following a power struggle with Gustav III of Sweden on the issue of who had the right to exercise control of the Danish Order of Freemasons, Christian VII on 29 April 1780 used his power of government to issue an order-in-council declaring, that Freemasons throughout Denmark, Norway, Schleswig and Holstein, were prohibited from recognising any foreign prince as head of the order.

During the absolute monarchy, the Crown acted as a protector of Freemasonry in Denmark. However, following the adoption of a constitution build on classical liberal principles and the departure from absolutism in 1848, the protected status was lost.

== Rituals and rites ==
From its very beginning in 1743, Freemasonry was decentralised, with lodges using rituals of what is most likely English origin. In 1747, Freemasons established a Danish-Norwegian provincial grand lodge, with Christian Conrad Danneskiold-Laurvig as grand master. This provincial grand lodge was abolished in 1765, following the successful attempt by the grand master himself and others, to introduce the Rite of Strict Observance; a chivalric brand of Freemasonry created in Germany by Karl Gotthelf von Hund. Following the death of von Hund in 1776, this system collapsed. Strict Observance was abolished following the Congress of Wilhelmsbad in 1782. The Danish Order of Freemasons has chosen to retain certain elements of Strict Observance within its high-degree system, as opposed to Freemasonic orders today adhering to the Swedish Rite.

The Rectified Rite was inspired by the Rectified Scottish Rite, which was introduced into continental Freemasonry as a replacement for Strict Observance, at the Masonic Congress of Wilhelmsbad in 1782. Because of disagreement at the congress on how to implement the higher degrees, the Danish delegation returned home before the issue was resolved, opting instead to introduce only the three agreed upon craft-degrees. Since there was no clarification as to what to do with the higher degrees, the Strict Observance Grand Chapter continued its work. Finally, in 1817, Prince Carl von Hessen-Kassel, then grand master, established a Scots St. Andrews lodge.

Like Strict Observance, the Swedish Rite was a system of chivalric Freemasonry created by the swede Carl Frederik Eckleff during the mid-1760s. Freemasons from the lodge Kosmos in Elsinore wanted to introduce the rituals in Denmark, having experienced the rituals themselves in Swedish. They attained the permission of King Frederick VII, acting as grand master, and began the practice in 1852. In 1858 the king, himself having experienced the rituals, founded the Grand Lodge of Denmark, working the highest Templar degrees in Copenhagen.

Since 1858, the Danish Order of Freemasons has practiced the rituals of the Swedish Rite. The Rite is divided into three divisions: St. John's (Craft) degrees (I–III), St. Andrew's ("Scottish") degrees (IV–VI) and the Chapter degrees (VII–X). Besides the Danish Order of Freemasons, a variety of fraternal organizations practice Freemasonry, using different Masonic rites. Two of these organizations are recognized by the Danish Order of Freemasons as regular, and they, in return, recognize the Grand Master of the Danish Order of Freemasons as their own grand master: The Danish Craft Masonry of Ancient, Free and Accepted Masons (Danish: Det Danske Frimurerlaug) work the three craft degrees following the English Emulation Ritual, while The Union of Johannes Lodges (Danish: Johanneslogeforbundet) work the three craft degrees following the Schröder Rite created by Friedrich Ludwig Schröder.

Among the other organizations, the English system is used by the independent Masonic Order of the Circle (Danish: Cirkel-Ordenen), while the Order of Sct. Andrews (Danish: Sct. Andreas Ordenen) and the Order of Serapion (Danish: Serapions-Ordenen) each use their own rites. Grand Lodge of Denmark of Ancient Free & Accepted Masons (Danish: Storlogen af Danmark af Gamle Frie & Antagne Murere) – not to be confused with the Danish Order of Freemasons, which is recognized as the grand lodge of Denmark by the United Grand Lodge of England - practice Ritus Hauniensis, a Danish system comparable to the York Rite. It is associated with the independent Great Orient, which work in accordance with the Scottish Rite's 33 degree system.

== Masonic orders in Denmark ==
=== Danish Order of Freemasons ===
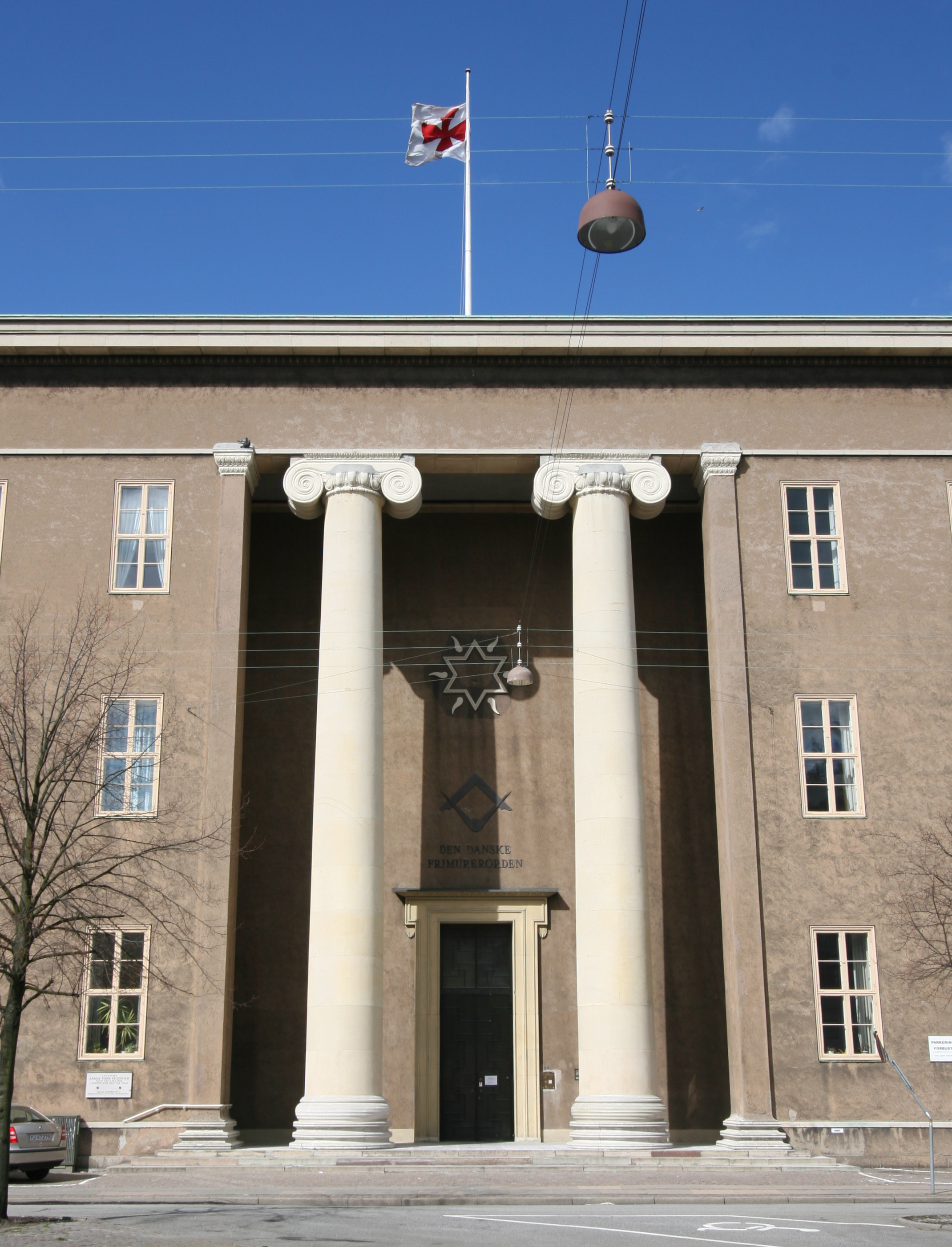
The Danish Grand Lodge-headquarters in Copenhagen

The Danish Order of Freemasons (Danish: Den Danske Frimurerorden) (abbr.: DDFO) was founded on 16 November 1858 and is the main governing body of regular Freemasonry in Denmark. With around 7,000 members, it is the largest Masonic order in the country.

In English, the order is known colloquially as the Grand Lodge of Denmark, though this is not a direct translation of its name. In addition, the order should not be confused with the much smaller and irregular Grand Lodge of Denmark of Ancient Free & Accepted Masons (Danish: Storlogen af Danmark af Gamle Frie & Antagne Murere).

The Danish Order of Freemasons has 92 lodges in 45 cities, all practicing the rituals of the Swedish Rite. The Rite is divided into three divisions:

1. St. John's (Craft) degrees (I–III)
2. St. Andrew's (Scottish) degrees (IV–VI)
3. Chapter degrees (VII–X).

The Swedish Rite demands members be Christian and not just that they believe in a supreme being. Like other Regular Masonic jurisdictions, only men are allowed membership.

Within the Danish Order of Freemasons are two quasi-autonomous orders, neither of which requires its members to produce a Christian certificate of baptism:

- The Danish Craft Masonry of Ancient, Free and Accepted Masons. (Danish: Det Danske Frimurerlaug af Gamle Frie og Antagne Murere) (abbr.: DDFL) has 42 lodges and practises the English Emulation Ritual. In 2012 seven members of Logen De Drie Hamre nr. 815 in the DDFL started up the only English-speaking Danish Freemasons lodge in Copenhagen, namely Lodge 850 Cosmopolitan.
- The Union of Johannes Lodges (Danish: Johanneslogeforbundet) has three lodges and practises the Schröder Rite created by Friedrich Ludwig Schröder.

Members of the Danish Order of Freemasons, the Danish Craft Masonry, and the Union of Johannes Lodges have mutual visiting privileges. Since both Danish Craft Masonry and Union only work the three degrees of craft Masonry, its members are invited to join the Order of Freemasons with respect to its higher degrees.

=== Grand Lodge of Denmark of Ancient Free & Accepted Masons ===
There is a fourth masonic obedience in Denmark, not within the Danish Order of Freemasons. The Grand Lodge of Denmark of Ancient Free & Accepted Masons (Danish: Storlogen af Danmark af Gamle Frie & Antagne Murere) was established in 1929. It follows the tradition of Orient or Continental Freemasonry and works in accordance to a ritual based on the York Rite (modified version of the 1929 Ritus Hauniensis written by Grunddal Sjallung). Grandlodge of Denmark A F & A M works: Apprentice, Fellow Craft, Mark Master (as second part of Fellow Craft), Master Mason, Installed Master - from 1989 is added, Excellent Master (Passing the Four Veils) & Royal Arch. It is a member of CLIPSAS.

=== Scandinavian Federation of Le Droit Humain ===
The International Order of Freemasonry for Men and Women, Le Droit Humain founded its first lodge in Scandinavia in what was then Kristiania (now Oslo) in 1912, in Copenhagen in 1917 and in Stockholm in 1918. The lodges of the order in Norway, Sweden and Denmark are linked together in the Scandinavian Federation.

== Literature ==
- Bugge K.L.: Det Danske Frimureries Historie, 2 volumes, 1910–1927 (in Danish)
- Kjeldsen, Jørgen (red.): I Guld og Himmelblaat, (Den Danske Frimurerorden, 1992) (in Danish)
