= Order of Charles XIII =

Swedish order of merit

The Royal Order of Charles XIII Kungliga Carl XIII:s orden
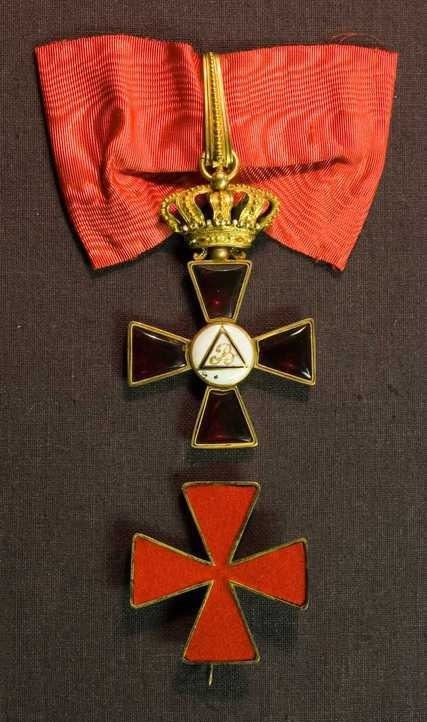
- Image of the cross of the order

Awarded by the monarch of Sweden
- Type: Single grade order of merit
- Eligibility: High-ranking Protestant Freemasons
- Awarded for: Service to Freemasonry.
- Status: Currently constituted
- Sovereign: King Carl XVI Gustaf
- Grades: Knight (RCXIII:sO)

Statistics
- First induction: 27 May 1811
- Last induction: 28 January 2025

Precedence
- Next (higher): Royal Order of Vasa
- Next (lower): Order of Saint John
- Ribbon of the order

The Royal Order of Charles XIII (Swedish: Kungliga Carl XIII:s orden) is a Swedish order of merit, founded by King Charles XIII in 1811.

== Membership ==
The Lord and Master of the Order is the King of Sweden, currently King Carl XVI Gustaf. Membership of the order can only be conferred on Freemasons of the Protestant faith. The membership of the order comprises:

- Thirty lay members and never more than seven non-Swedish members, each holding the XI (highest) degree of the Swedish Rite of Freemasonry, i.e. either regional heads or national heads.
- Three clerical members, invariably priests or bishops of the Church of Sweden.
- All princes of the Royal House of Sweden are members from birth, but do not wear the insignia unless they are Knight and Commander of the Red Cross of the Swedish Order of Freemasons. (Hence the insignia is not worn by the King nor the Duke of Värmland, who are both Knights of the Order from birth).
- Foreign princes of Blood Royal may be admitted as honorary members, if they are also senior Freemasons, whether of the Swedish Order or another; they are full members of the Order, but do not count towards its membership limits; Prince Edward, Duke of Kent (United Kingdom) was admitted to the Order on 6 November 2000.

There can never be more than 33 persons who are members at the same time. (Men of royal blood are automatically members, and do not count as part of the 33 allotted slots).

== Insignia and regalia ==
The insignia consists of a red St George cross, in the centre a white globe with the monogram of the institutor, two opposite letters C surrounding XIII, in gold. On the reverse the globe has the letter B in gold in an equilateral black and gold edged triangle. The cross is surmounted by a closed golden crown. The insignia is worn around the neck in a red ribbon. There is also red breast red cross: the insignia hence is the same as a Commander 1st Class and recipients rank after the Commanders 1st Class of the Swedish Royal Orders.

The order uses a habit, introduced 1822, and new knights are dubbed.

== See also ==
- Orders, decorations, and medals of Sweden
