= Danish Order of Freemasons =

Danish fraternal order of freemasonry

The Danish Order of Freemasons
- Coat of arms of the Danish Order of Freemasons, made in the 2010s and based on the previous one from 1974
- Established: 16 November 1858; 167 years ago
- Location: Denmark
- Coordinates: 55°41′51.34″N 12°34′22.91″E
- Region served: Denmark
- Grand Master: Peter Olesen Dahl
- Website: www.ddfo.dk (in Danish)

The Danish Order of Freemasons (Danish: Den Danske Frimurerorden, abbr.: DDFO), in English also known as the Grand Lodge of Denmark, is a governing body of some Masonic Lodges in Denmark. The Danish Order of Freemasons was founded on 16 November 1858.

The Danish Order of Freemasons has 92 Lodges all working in accordance with the rituals of the Swedish Rite and all requiring members be baptised in the Christian faith. The Danish Order of Freemasons has approximately 6,500 members.

Affiliated to the Danish Order of Freemasons are two Masonic organisations, both of which have their own Lodges and do not require members be baptised in the Christian faith: The Ancient Fraternity of Free and Accepted Masons of Denmark (Danish: Det Danske Frimurerlaug af Gamle Frie & Antagne Murere) has approximately 1,200 members and 41 Lodges practising the rituals of the Emulation Rite, while the Saint John's Lodge Association (Danish: Johanneslogeforbundet af Gamle, Frie og Antagne Murere) has approximately 150 members and 3 Lodges practising the rituals of the Schröder Rite. Members of the Danish Order of Freemasons, the Ancient Fraternity of Free and Accepted Masons of Denmark, and the Saint John's Lodge Association have mutual visiting privileges. Since the Ancient Fraternity of Free and Accepted Masons of Denmark and the Saint John's Lodge Association only work three craft degrees, their members may be invited to join the Danish Order of Freemasons with respect to its higher degrees.

The building owned by the Danish Order of Freemasons is located on Blegdamsvej in Copenhagen's Østerbro district. The building was designed by Danish architect Holger Rasmussen and was built between 1 May 1923 and 12 October 1927. The cornerstone was laid on 3 June 1924 by Christian X of Denmark. The building has 13,515 square metres of floor space and approximately 335 rooms. It is 19.5 metres tall and has six main floors, two of which are below ground. The two columns by the main entrance are 16 metres tall and weigh 72 tons each. During the later part of the Second World War the building was occupied and was used as headquarters by the Schalburg Corps.

== See also ==
- Freemasonry in Denmark
- Freemasons' Hall, Copenhagen
