= Blegdamsvej Prison =

Prison in Copenhagen, Denmark

Coordinates: 55.6912°N 12.5622°E

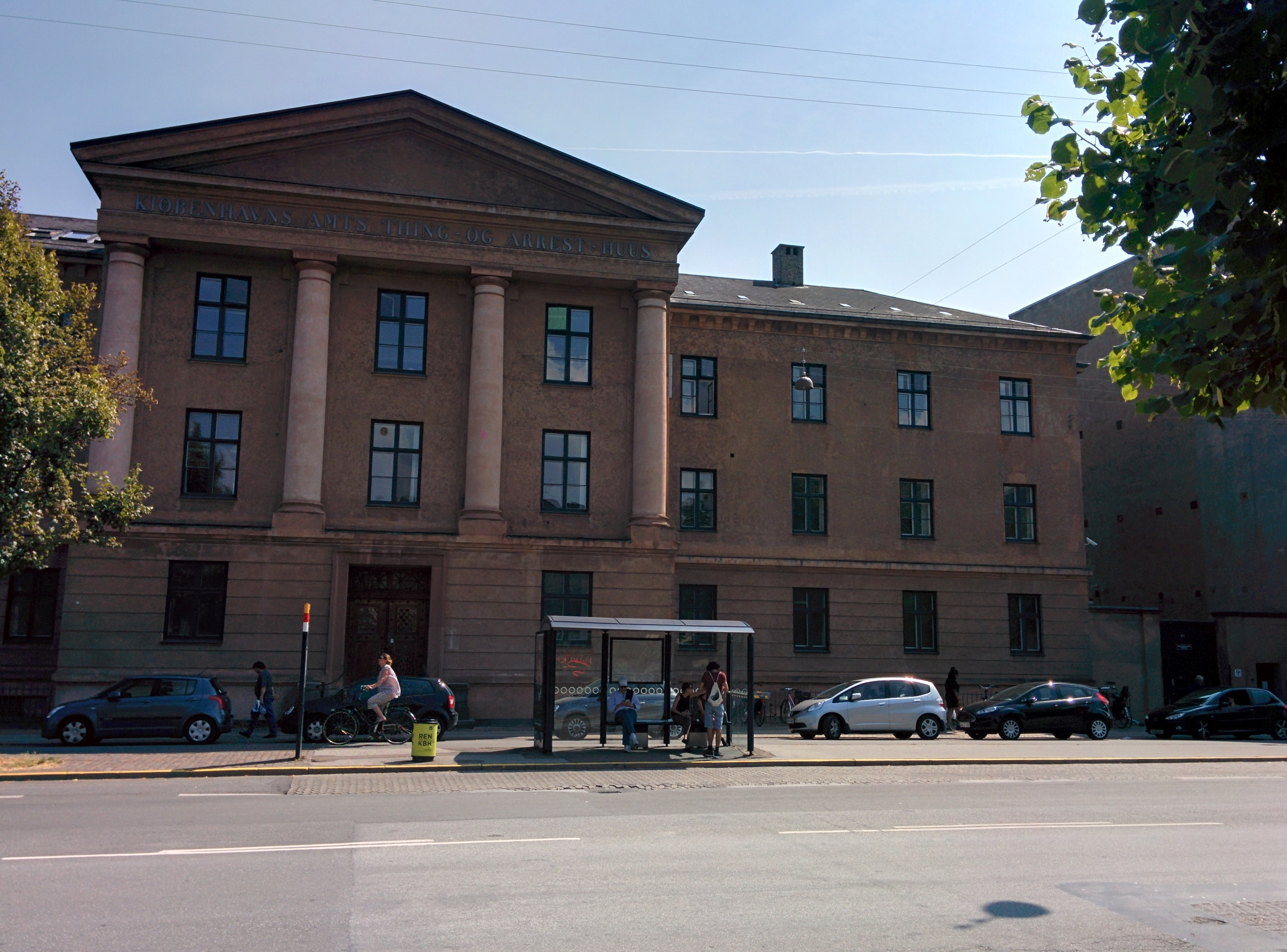
- Interactive map of Blegdamsvej Prison
- Location: Nørrebro, Copenhagen, Denmark
- Status: Active
- Population: 91
- Opened: 18 December 1848
- Managed by: Københavns Fængsler

Blegdamsvej Prison (Danish: Blegdamsvejens Fængsel) is a prison operated by Københavns Fængsler on Blegdamsvej in the Nørrebro district of Copenhagen, Denmark. Established in 1848, it is the oldest prison building still in use in Denmark.

== History ==
The prison was built by Copenhagen County as a replacement for Frederiksholms Arresthus which was located in a former powder magazine from 1665 at Langebro. Copenhagen County's prison was used for prisoners from the suburbs as well as for employees at the royal court. The prison at Langebro Bridge had been considered outdated for at least half a century when it was finally decided to build a new onne. The site that was selected was located within the so-called demarcation line that enforced a no-built zone outside Copenhagen's fortification ring and it therefore had to be approved by king Christian VIII. Michael Gottlieb Bindesbøll was charged with the design of the new building that was inaugurated on 18 December 1949. Adam Oehlenschläger had written a cantata for the opening ceremony that was attended by Frederik VII who had succeeded his father earlier that year.

The prison was expanded in 1880. It was modernized in 1907–13 to designs by Carl Thonning and again in 1927-28 under supercision of Emil Jørgensen.

== Today ==
Blegdamsvej Prison is now managed by Københavns Fængsler and used for male prisoners. The three-storey building has room for 91 inmates.

== See also ==
- Copenhagen Stocks House
- Women's Prison, Christianshavn
