= Jørgen Ernst Meyer =

Danish industrialist (1802–1873)

Jørgen Ernst Meyer (17 May 1802 – 11 September 1873) was a Danish industrialist. He founded the company E. Meyer in 1934 and established Denmark's first lacquerware factory in 1842. He was also a co-founder of Copenhagen Industrial Society in 1838.

== Early life and education ==
Meyer was born on 17 May 1802 at Charlottenlund on Langeland, the son of Frederik Meyer (1762–1823) and Adamine Juliane Christine Thode. The family moved to Odense where he later apprenticed as a house painter.

== Career ==
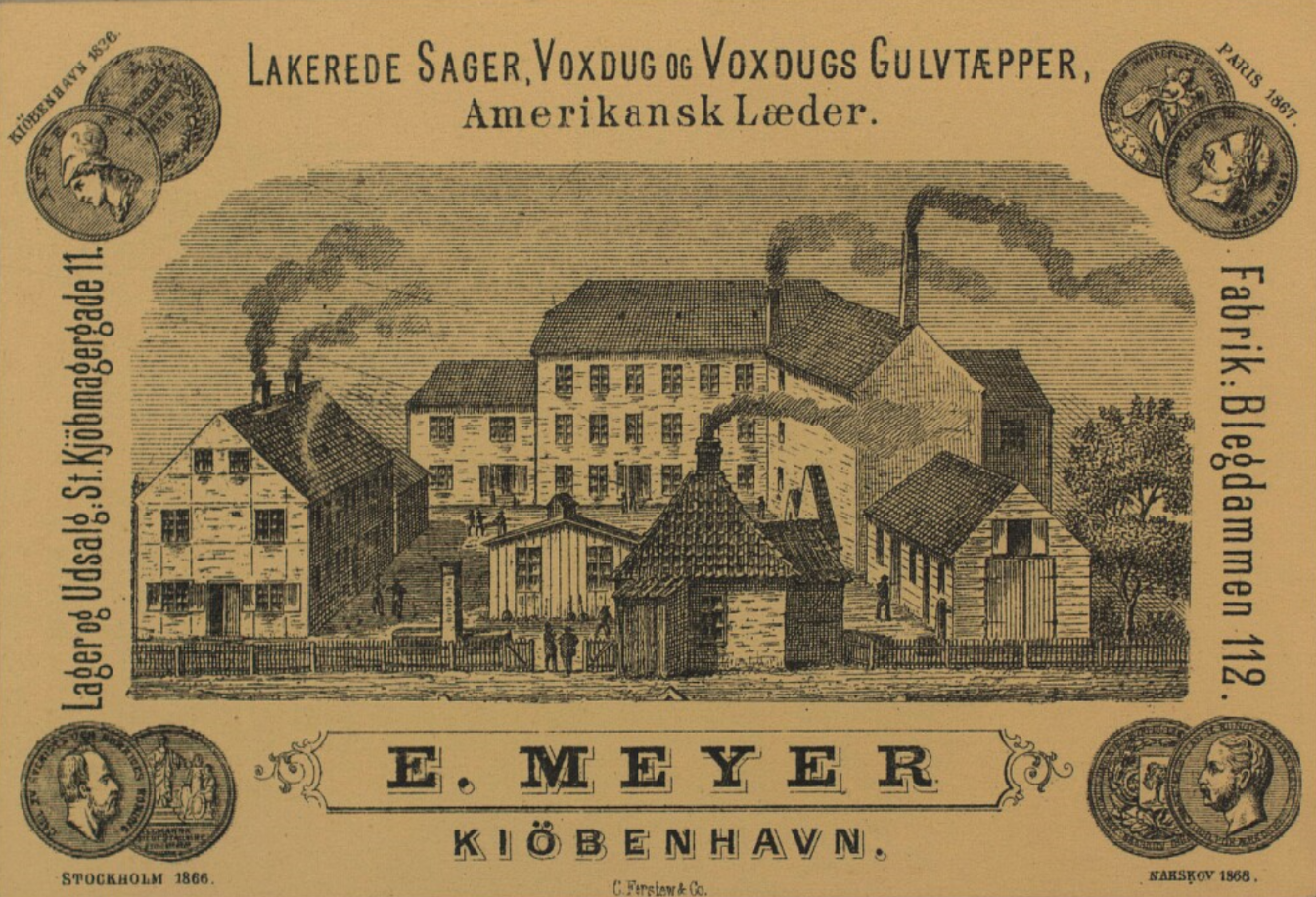
Advertisement for E. Meyer featuring the factory at Blegdamsvej 112 in Copenhagen

In 1822, Meyer started working for S. Hambroe, one of the largest painting firms in Copenhagen, while at the same time studying at the Royal Danish Academy of Fine Arts. Meyer became one of Hambroe's most trusted employees and it was probably Meyer who inspired Hambroe to establish Denmark's first production of oilcloth in 1832.

After Hambroe's death, on 28 June 1834, Meyer was granted citizenship as a master painter. He also established his own oilcloth factory and in 1939 obtained a patent on the production of waterproof clothing. In 1842, he established Denmark's first lacquerware factory at Blegdamsvej 112, specializing in lacquer trays. He was represented at the 1873 Vienna World's Fair as well as a number of other international exhibitions.

== Other activities ==
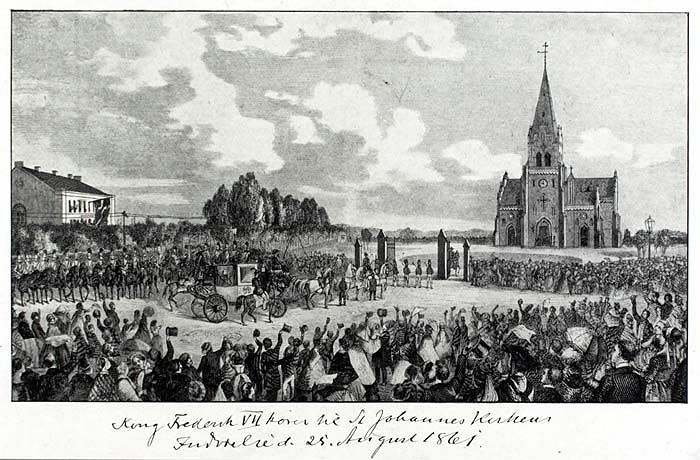
King Frederik VII's arrival for the inauguration of St. John's Church

He was a co-founder of Copenhagen Industrial Society (Industriforeningen i København) in 1838 and was for a few years a member of the board of representatives. He was active as a fundraiser in connection with the construction of St. Jogn's Church (1856-61). He was also a captain in Copenhagen Fire Brigade.

== Personal life and legacy ==
Meyer married Johanne Nicoline Schneider (1820-1897) on 15 March 1845) in Trinitatis Church in Copenhagen. He died on 11 September 1873 and is buried at Assistens Cemetery.

His company was after his death continued by his widow under the leadership of their eldest son Axel Meyer (born 1846). Axel Meyer and his younger brother and Emil Meyer (1856–1930) became partners in the company in 1882.

In 1910, E. Meyer was headquartered in Jorcks Passage. The company was from 1930 owned by E. R. Tjørn (born 1885). In 1950, it was headquartered at Farvergade 15.

== See also ==
- E. Meyer
