= Freemasons' Hall, Copenhagen =

Building in Copenhagen

Coordinates: 55°41′51.4608″N 12°34′22.84″E

Freemasons' Hall
- Ordenens Stamhus
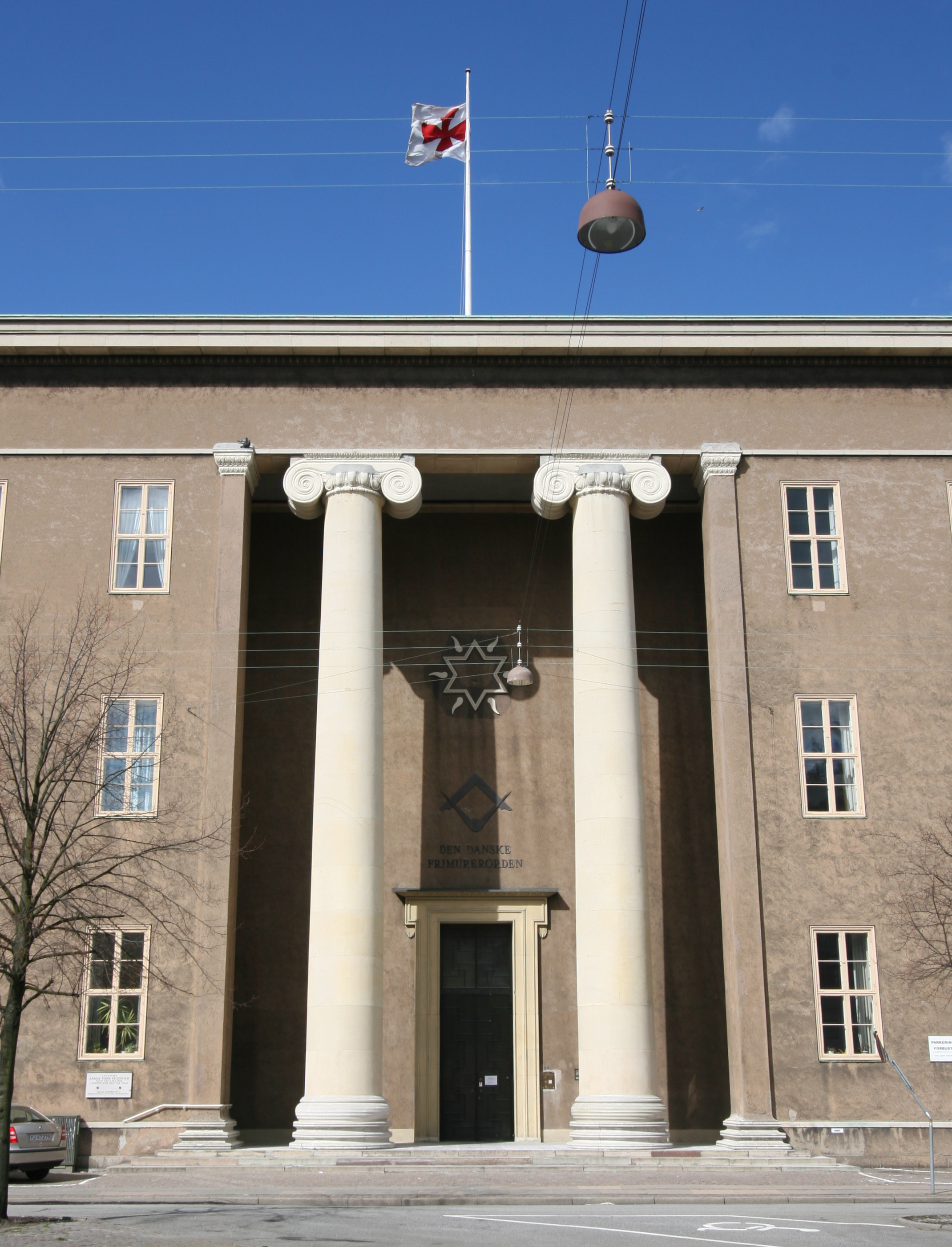
- Freemasons' Hall in Copenhagen
- Interactive map of the Freemasons' Hall area

General information
- Architectural style: Neoclassical
- Location: Blegdamsvej 23; 2100 Copenhagen; Denmark
- Construction started: 1923
- Completed: 1927
- Owner: The Danish Order of Freemasons

Technical details
- Structural system: Reinforced concrete

Design and construction
- Architect: Holger Rasmussen

Freemasons' Hall (Danish: Ordenens Stamhus) located on Blegdamsvej in Copenhagen's Østerbro district, Denmark, is the headquarters of the Danish Order of Freemasons and a meeting place for the Masonic Lodges in the Copenhagen area.

== History ==
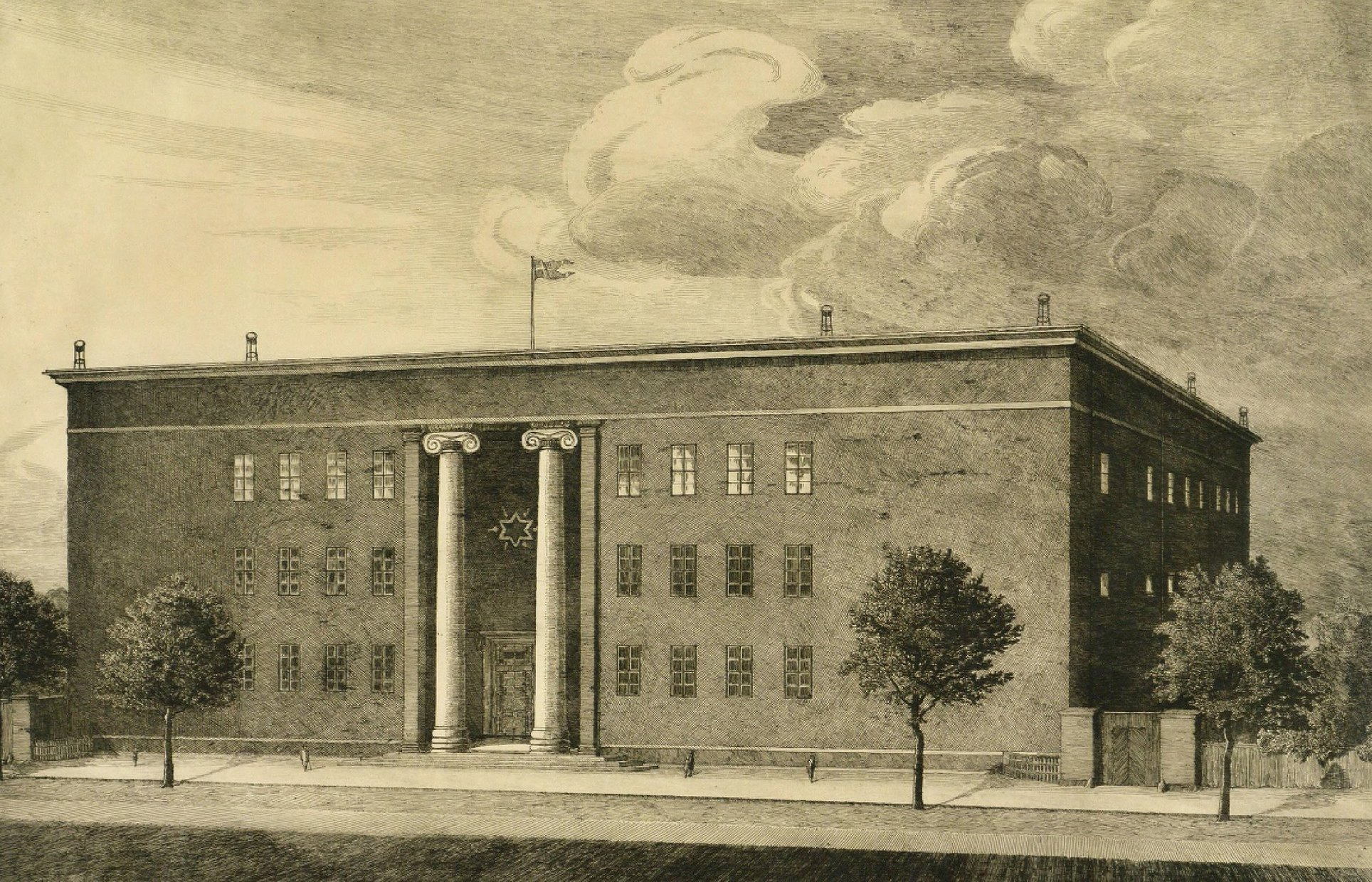
Axel Holm: The Freemasons' Hall, 1928

The Danish Order of Freemasons had moved between various addresses and at the beginning of the 20th century was based in Klerkegade in Copenhagen.

When the municipal authorities in Copenhagen sold off a strip of land along Blegdamsvej, previously part of the park Fælledparken, the Danish Order of Freemasons acquired a piece of land. In 1920, a competition was held among its architect members for the design of a new headquarters. Martin Nyrop, architect of Copenhagen City Hall and himself a Freemason, sat on the panel of judges. The winning entry was submitted by Holger Rasmussen, a relatively unknown Danish architect who had mainly designed modest buildings for Danish State Railways. The Freemasons' Hall was of a different stature entirely. The Freemasons' Hall was built from 1923 to 1927. The cornerstone was laid on 3 June 1924 by Christian X of Denmark, who was himself a Freemason.

== Architecture ==
Built to a rather austere Neoclassical design, the Freemasons' Hall is a large grey block. The front toward Blegdamsvej is dominated by an over-dimensioned entrance section flanked by two monumental columns, which are 16 metres tall and weigh 72 tons each. The building is typical of its time. Reacting to an excess of detail in Historicism, Neoclassicism had made a comeback in Danish architecture in about 1915 and lasted until the mid-1930s. Another example of the style is Hack Kampmann's Copenhagen Police Headquarters from 1924.

The Freemasons' Hall has 13,515 square metres of floor space and approximately 335 rooms. It is 19.5 metres tall and has six main floors, two of which are below ground.
