= Swedish Rite =

Variation of Freemasonry common in Scandinavian countries

The red cross of the above form, in Scandinavia known as a St George's cross, is a commonly used symbol for Freemasonry in the Swedish Rite, alongside the internationally otherwise more common Square and Compasses.

The Swedish Rite is a variation or Rite of Freemasonry that is common in Scandinavian countries and to a limited extent in Germany. It is different from other branches of Freemasonry in that, rather than having the three self-contained foundation degrees and seemingly-endless side degrees and appendant bodies, it has an integrated system with ten degrees. It is also different in that, rather than moving through the offices or 'chairs', progress in the Swedish Rite is based on moving through the ten degrees. A fundamental difference is the Swedish Rite's position on religious affiliation: Anglo/American 'Regular' Masonry requires a belief in any theistic religion and Continental 'Liberal' Masonry does not require belief in any religion, whereas Swedish Masonry is specifically Christian, and requires a Christian belief in all its members. Nonetheless, the main Swedish Rite constitutions are all recognised as regular by the United Grand Lodge of England, and stand in full amity.

The Swedish Rite is the default and customary Masonic rite in Sweden, Denmark, Norway, and Iceland. In Finland there exists an agreement of shared jurisdiction between the native Grand Lodge of Finland, working standard Anglo-American tradition Masonry, and a Provincial Grand Lodge of the Swedish Rite Swedish Order of Freemasons. A variant form of the Swedish Rite is worked in Germany by the Grand Landlodge of the Freemasons of Germany, where it is one of five different Masonic systems that co-exist within the umbrella group the United Grand Lodges of Germany.

Although fully independent of each other, the Scandinavian Grand Lodges work closely together to ensure that their rituals are as similar as possible.

Since 7 November 2006 all laws of the Swedish Order of Freemasons are publicly available on the Internet. Among others, the laws prohibit any member to gain advantages outside the lodge by using the lodge as an instrument. The laws also stress the charity works of the members and the observance of the Golden Rule.

== Membership ==
The Swedish Rite has approximately 16,500 members in the Swedish Obedience (of which 15,200 are in Sweden and 1,300 in Finland), 8,000 in Denmark, 3,500 in Iceland, and 16,700 in Norway.

Members must be at least twenty-one years of age and of good repute; they must be recommended by at least two members, one of whom must have at least the seventh degree and the other at least the third. The traditional rule that a candidate must come of his own will and accord is enforced within the Swedish Rite and solicitation of members is strictly prohibited.

A final requirement is that the candidate professes to adhere to a mainstream Christian faith. If the Christian belief of the candidate is in doubt, a birth certificate may be requested; in the Scandinavian countries, birth certificates contain a field for religion. Owing to the religious history of the Scandinavian nations, Swedish Rite Freemasonry has strong connections with the various national Lutheran churches, which are the majority churches of all the Swedish Rite nations. However, members of any Christian denomination are accepted into membership. Membership of certain sects which are unrecognised by the World Council of Churches does not qualify a candidate for membership of the Swedish Rite; these include the Mormons, the Unification Church (the Moonies), and Jehovah's Witnesses.

== Degrees and Structure ==
=== Overview ===
Swedish Rite masonry has ten degrees divided into three groups. The first two groups are called lodges, while the third is called simply Chapter. I.-III.-degree masons meet in a St. John's lodge (equivalent to Blue Lodge or Craft Lodge). IV-V. and VI.-degree masons meet in a St. Andrew's lodge (in some areas equivalent to the Scottish Rite) while VII.-X.-degree masons meet in their respective Chapter.

As a cherished relic from the previously practised Rite of Strict Observance, The Grand Lodge of Denmark maintains a Novice-degree in between the VII. and VIII.-degree.

All grand lodge officers have to be Knights and Commanders of the Red Cross (or simply "R&K"), of which there are a limited number. Though not formally a degree, grand lodge officers, as a means of expressing the hierarchical nature of the order, are sometimes said to have obtained the XI.-degree. Since being a Knight and Commander of the Red Cross is linked with the duties of a grand lodge office, only a very few Swedish Rite-masons will become one.

=== Degrees ===
The Swedish Rite system is grouped into three divisions:

==== St John's ("Craft") degrees ====
- I – Apprentice
- II – Fellow Craft
- III – Master Mason

==== St Andrew's ("Scottish") degrees ====
- IV/V – Very Worshipful Apprentice and Fellow of St Andrew (a double degree)
- VI – Illustrious Scottish Master of St Andrew

==== Chapter degrees ====
- VII – Very Illustrious Brother, Knight of the East
- VIII – Most Illustrious Brother, Knight of the West
- IX – Enlightened Brother of St John's Lodge
- X – Very Enlightened Brother of St Andrew's Lodge

Honorific chapter degree for Grand Lodge Officers and Provincial Grand Masters:

- XI – Most Enlightened Brother, Knight and Commander of the Red Cross ("R&K")

=== Structure ===
St. John's, St. Andrew's and Chapter work are done in different rooms or buildings. While many towns have a St. John's (Craft) Lodge, fewer have a St. Andrew's Lodge. There is only one Chapter per masonic district.

In Denmark, Norway and Germany a mason will retain his craft lodge-membership while advancing through the St. Andrew's and Chapter degrees, and pay dues to all. In Denmark, dues are collected by the Danish Order of Freemasons and distributed to the relevant St. John's, St. Andrew's and Chapter-organisations.

In Sweden, Finland, and Iceland a mason will not retain his craft lodge-membership, when he advances to the IV–V.-degree, or his St. Andrew's Lodge-membership, when he advances to the VII.-degree. Also, dues are paid only to the lodge of which the mason is presently a member. Because of the sometimes large distance between one's home and the closest St. Andrew's Lodge, travel outlays can be excessive. To remedy this, Square-and-Compasses Clubs or Friendship Clubs were created in small towns so that St. Andrew's or Chapter Freemasons can socialise without travelling inordinate distances; in Denmark these are called Instruction Lodges. Friendship Clubs cannot confer degrees, except by dispensation from Grand Lodge.

Swedish freemasons can in rare cases be awarded with the Order of Charles XIII. This is a Royal order of chivalry, equivalent to a knighthood and given only to Knights and Commanders of the Red Cross at the King's pleasure; its members may not number more than thirty-three, and three of them must be ecclesiastics of the established Lutheran Church. Although it is jokingly termed the 'twelfth degree', the Order of Charles XIII is in no way a part of the official Swedish Rite, and is not classed as a masonic degree.

The Masonic ring is given in the eighth degree, and consists of the customary red St. George's Cross and has the Masonic initials I.D.S which stands for In Dominus Spees. It is worn on the middle finger of the right hand. A Knight of the West is also made to design his own coat of arms, taking the traditional European rules of heraldry into account. The resulting coat-of-arms hangs in his Provincial Grand Lodge.

The tenth degree is the highest ordinarily attainable; it can be received after roughly twenty-one years of regular attendance and good proficiency in the ritual, but the time between the degrees may be shorter if the member is active and accepts different offices in his lodges.

== Lodge Officers and Offices ==
The lodges are managed by a Worshipful Master, who will be assisted by one or more Deputy Masters (these are given Latin ordinal names: primary, secondary, and so forth). There are also the Primary and Secondary Wardens, a Master of Ceremonies, a Secretary, a Treasurer, an Orator, and a Director of Music.

The lodge offices do not rotate as in e.g. American freemasonry. A mason is not obliged or expected to take up an office, nor is there a progression between the offices. E.g.: Any man holding the appropriate degree may campaign for election as Worshipful Master without ever having held any office before, and the same holds for all the other offices of the Rite.

While the Master and his deputies, as well as the Wardens, are voted in, other officers are appointed by the Master. Once elected or appointed one often keeps his position for at least some years, while the Master will usually hold his position for the better part of a decade, though Sweden has a limit of six years per term and a retirement age of 75 years old.

There are rules dictating minimum degrees for the various officers and their substitutes. In Denmark, the officers of a St. John's lodge must uniformly be at least Master Masons; Wardens must be Knights of the East; and the Worshipful Master must be (depending on source) a Knight of the West or a Right Enlightened Brother of St. Andrew.

Deputy officers are fully empowered to take the place of their principals at stated meetings.

== Ritual ==
There is a single progression through the degrees of the Swedish Rite, as opposed to the multiple optional side degrees and appendant bodies of Anglo-American Masonry. Swedish Rite Masons join at the level of an Entered Apprentice, and, with time, become Right Enlightened Brothers of St Andrew.

The morality and symbolism taught in the St John degrees is the same as that of the Blue Lodge; in addition, Swedish Rite Master Masons and Master Masons elsewhere in the world are fully accepted as visitors in each other's lodges. The layout of a St John's lodge-room and that of a Blue Lodge is different from that of the Swedish Rite, as is the ritual excepting the word and grips of recognition, which are universal.

The Swedish Rite places more emphasis on the mystical and the spiritual while the Anglo-American version of Freemasonry prioritises memorisation. According to Alex G. Davidson, the mood in an English lodge-room is "relaxed and friendly" compared to the "mysterious and gloomy", "intensely solemn and almost mystical... otherworldly atmosphere" of the Swedish Rite.

While English Masonry places importance on so-called word-perfect ritual, committed to memory and repeated without a single deviation from the prepared text, the Swedish Rite focuses more strongly on the spirit of the ritual. Accordingly, Lodge officers are given a book from which to read during degree ceremonies; the task of delivering these speeches falls on an officer known as the Orator. Candidates are examined on their proficiency of the previous degree: by this is meant that, prior to being passed or raised, as appropriate, candidates are made to write down the salient points of the morality taught by the previous degree.

The way by which a Lodge in the Swedish Rite is called to work and to refreshment is also different from the English way. The Junior and Senior Wardens do not have pedestals that they set on their sides; rather, they wear handle-less, hyperboloidal mallets similar to gavels with which they strike the hilt of their swords.

== History ==
The primary foundations of the Swedish Rite are from the late 18th century when Carl Friedrich Eckleff created the first St. Andrew's lodge in Stockholm in 1756 and the first Grand Chapter in 1759. His ideas of a truly progressive system to continue the existing system with three degrees was further developed by Duke Karl of Södermanland, the later Charles XIII of Sweden, who also became the Grand Master of the Swedish Order of Freemasons. By 1800 the Swedish rite had fully evolved and since then has had mostly minor changes. In Denmark, the first St. Andrew's Lodge started working in 1855 and the first Chapter shortly after in 1858; this effectively marked the beginning of Swedish Rite in Denmark.

== Grand Lodges using the rite ==
The Swedish Rite is used by:

- The Swedish Order of Freemasons, with lodges in Sweden and Finland.
- The Norwegian Order of Freemasons
- The Danish Order of Freemasons
- The Icelandic Order of Freemasons
- The Grand Lodge of Spain, but only in the lodge of St. John's three degrees, with Danish lodges in Fuengirola and Nerja on the Costa del Sol, and Norwegian lodges in Costa Blanca and Gran Canaria.

An earlier version of the rite, the Zinnendorf Rite, is used by:

- Grand Landlodge of the Freemasons of Germany
- The Grand Lodge of Latvia, but only in the lodges Pie Zobena, Castor, and Pie trīs kronētiem zobeniem.

== See also ==
- Freemasonry in Denmark
- Freemasonry in Sweden
- Order of Charles XIII (Charles XIII of Sweden)
- List of Masonic rites
