= Lodge St. Olaus to the white Leopard =

Freemasonic Lodge in Norway

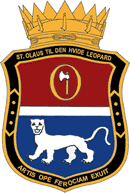
The coat of arms of Lodge St Olaus to the white leopard

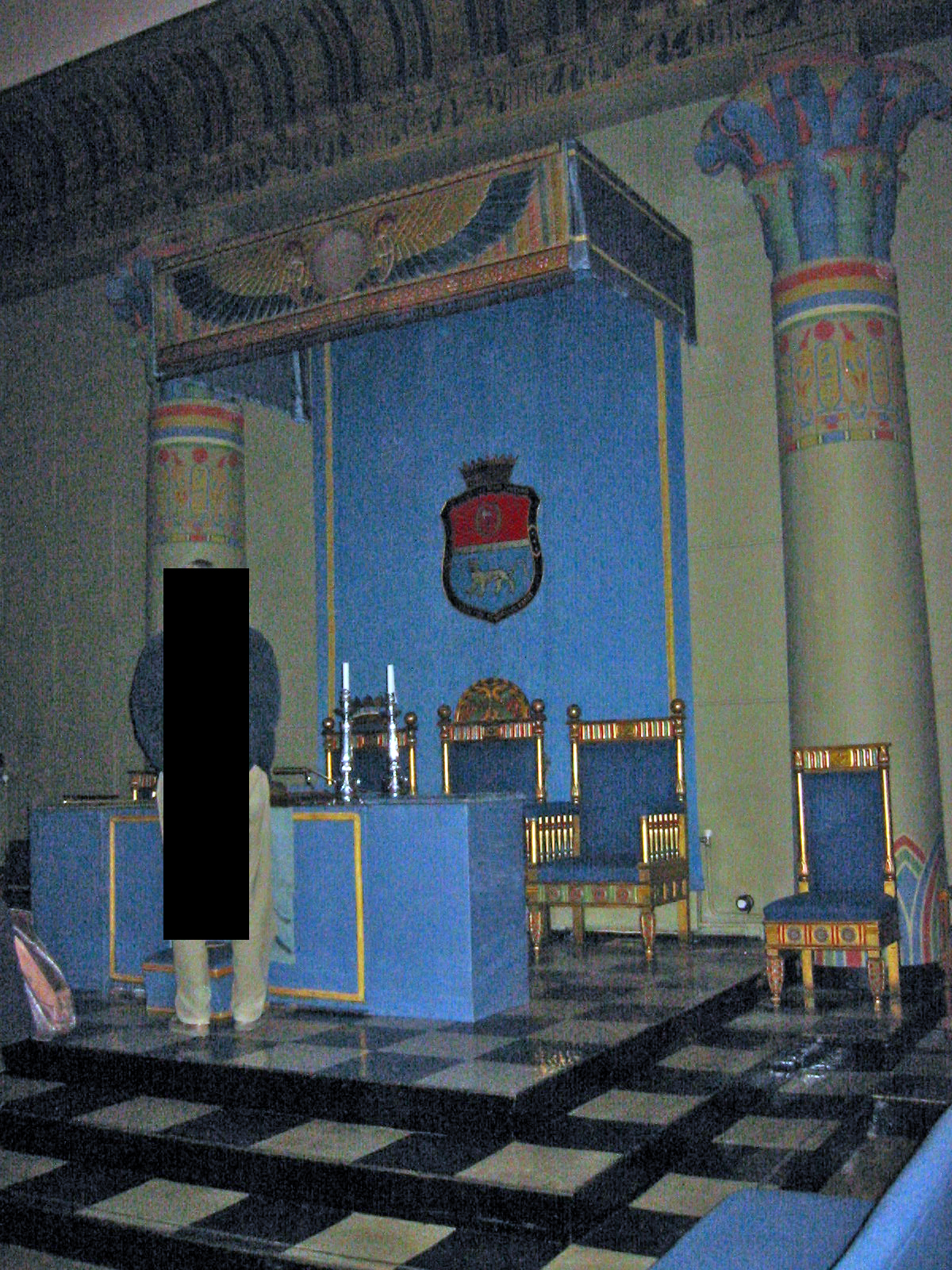
The hall of St. John, the mother house in Oslo. Behind the altar is to be seen the coat of arms of the St. John lodge "St. Olaus"

Lodge St. Olaus to the white leopard (Danish: St. Olaus til den hvide leopard) is a Freemasonic Lodge within the Norwegian Order of Freemasons. It was established on June 24, 1749, on the island of Ladegaard, in the building of Bygdøy Kongsgaard in Christiania. The original name of the lodge was St. Olai, and it was named after the Norwegian king Olaf the Holy (Olai is a Latin genitive form of Olav). In 1780, the lodge changed its name to Saint Olaus to the white leopard.

In 1785, the second City Hall of Christiana (built in 1733) was bought by St. Olai Lodge. The inauguration of the lodge rooms was carried out by Bernt Anker, and the lodge had its residence on the ground floor and the first floor until 1811. Today, the lodge resides inside the headquarters of the Norwegian Order of Freemasons in Nedre Vollgt. 19, Oslo, as a neighbour building of the Norwegian Storting.

The coat of arms of the Lodge carries the Latin inscription ARTIS OPE FEROCIAM EXUIT: "With the help of the Art, it (the leopard) shall get rid of its wildness (or rage)".

St. Olai Lodge was the first Masonic lodge in Norway, and the mother lodge of many lodges in the Norwegian Order of Freemasons. It was founded by Count Christian Conrad Danneskiold-Laurvig, probably with the Danish-Norwegian king Frederick V present at the initiation ceremony. The lodge is an offshoot of the Danish lodge St. Martin, which existed in Copenhagen from 1743 to 1767.

== Nationality ==
The lodge received its directives from Danish Freemasonic lodges from 1749 to 1818. Its first mother lodge was "St. Martin", founded in Copenhagen in 1743. In 1745, the lodge "Zorobabel", also in Copenhagen, was founded as an offshoot of "St. Martin", with a Patent from the Premier Grand Lodge of England dated 25 October 1745. The two lodges "St. Martin" and "Zorobabel" were unified into the new lodge "Zorobabel to the Northern Star" on 9 January 1767, upon which the new lodge became the new directing lodge of St. Olaus.

In 1818, due to the union between Norway and Sweden, the lodge St. Olaus to the white leopard became a member of the Swedish Order of Freemasons. The lodge was one of the six founding members of the Norwegian Order of Freemasons ("Province X") on 24 June 1891.

== Rites ==
On its foundation in 1749, St Olaus was a pure lodge of St. John, a "blue lodge" practising the Craft degrees. In 1752, the lodge also gradually began to practise the high degrees of Rite of Strict Observance. The establishment of the rites was finished in 1762 and was practised in cooperation with the Copenhagen lodges until 1782.

The rectified rite was introduced in Denmark and Norway in 1782. It was influenced by French Freemasonry and was less concerned with Christian institutions. Among other things, it no longer claimed to be the true and direct heirs to the legendary Knights Templar.

In 1818, St. Olaus was directed from the Swedish Grand lodge, and in 1819 it was transformed into a "blue lodge" of St. John, practising the three Craft degrees since then.

== Literature ==
- Karl Ludvig Tørrisen Bugge: St. Johs. Logen St. Olaus Til Den Hvide Leopard i Kristiania 1749-1757-1907, Jubileumsskrift 1907.
- Kr. Thorbjørnsen: St. Olai Brødre. Blad av St. Johs. Logen. St. Olaus til den hvide Leopards historie gjennom 200 år, 1947, printed as a manuscript for brothers (Masons).
- Matrikkel over Den Norske Frimurerorden for arbeidsåret 1996–97, Aktietrykkeriet i Trondhjem
- Matrikkel over Den Norske Frimurerorden for arbeidsåret 2007, Aktietrykkeriet i Trondhjem
