= Blegdamsvej =

Street in Copenhagen, Denmark

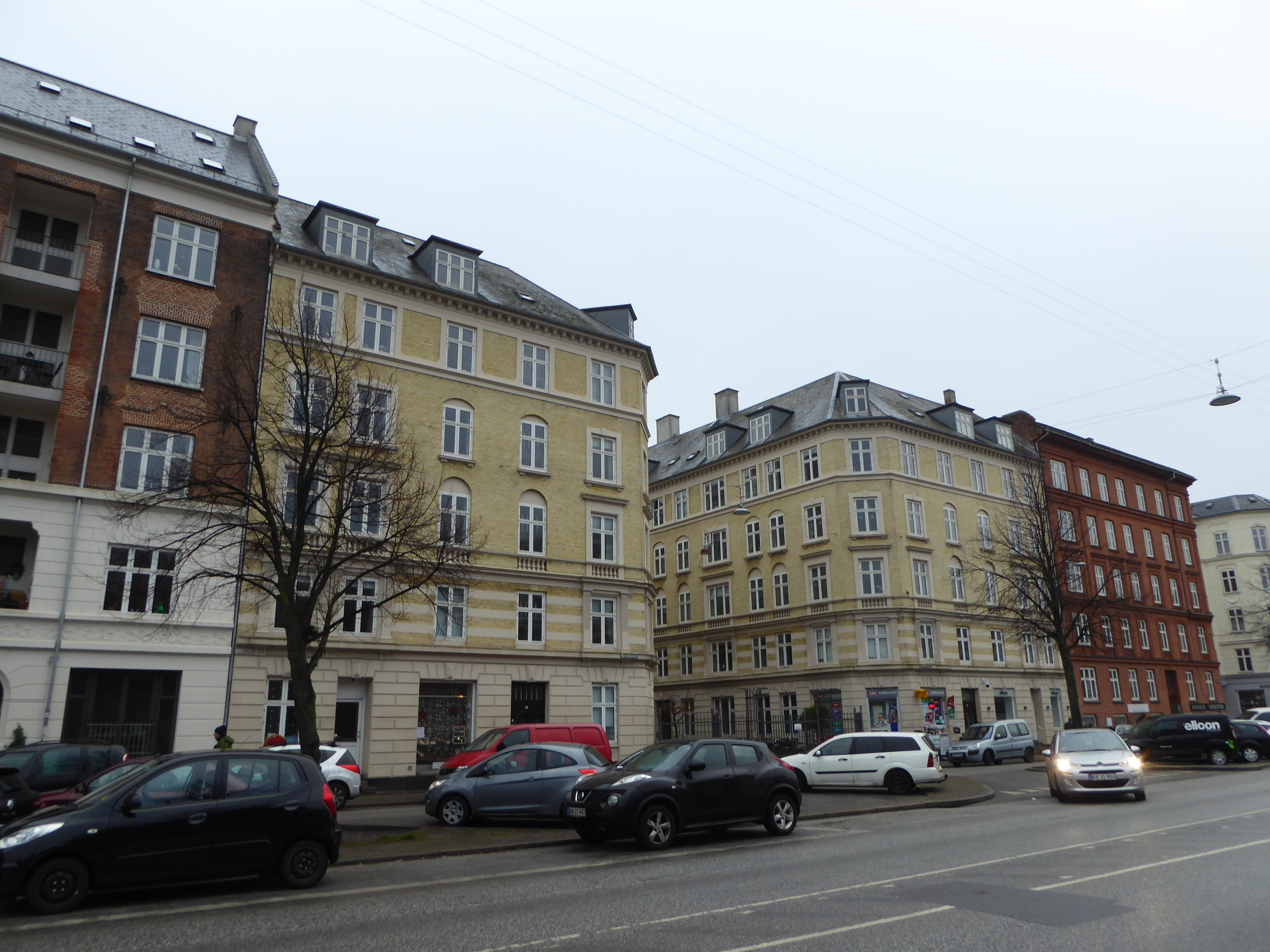
- Blegdamsvej
- Length: 1,340 m (4,400 ft)
- Location: Copenhagen, Denmark
- Quarter: Østerbro
- Postal code: 2100, 2400
- Nearest metro station: Trianglen Station
- Coordinates: 55°41′48″N 12°34′18″E

Blegdamsvej is a street in Copenhagen, Denmark, connecting Sankt Hans Torv in Nørrebro to Trianglen in Østerbro. The busy artery Fredensgade separates the Nørrebro and Østerbro sections of the street from each other. The north side of the street is dominated by the Panum Building and Rigshospitalet, located on either side of Tagensvej.

== History ==
=== The bleaching ponds and Blegdam Common ===
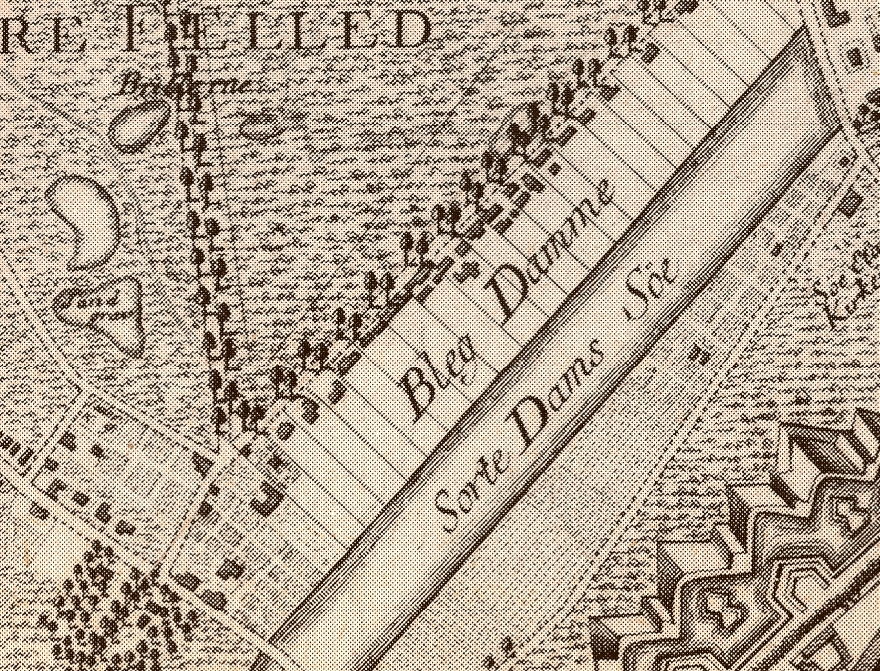
The narrow bleaching ponds along Sortedam Lake seen on a map detail from 1784

Blegdamsvej is first mentioned in 1694 and takes its name after the 24 ponds on the west side of Sortedam and Peblinge Lake, which was used for textile bleaching. They were established in about 1772 and had numbers from south to north, beginning at present day Sankt Hans Torv. On the other side of the ponds was Blegedam Common, the oldest of Copenhagen's commons, where the bleachers left the cloth to bleach in the sun. Lined with trees on both sides, mainly horse chestnut, willow and lime trees.

=== Early industry ===
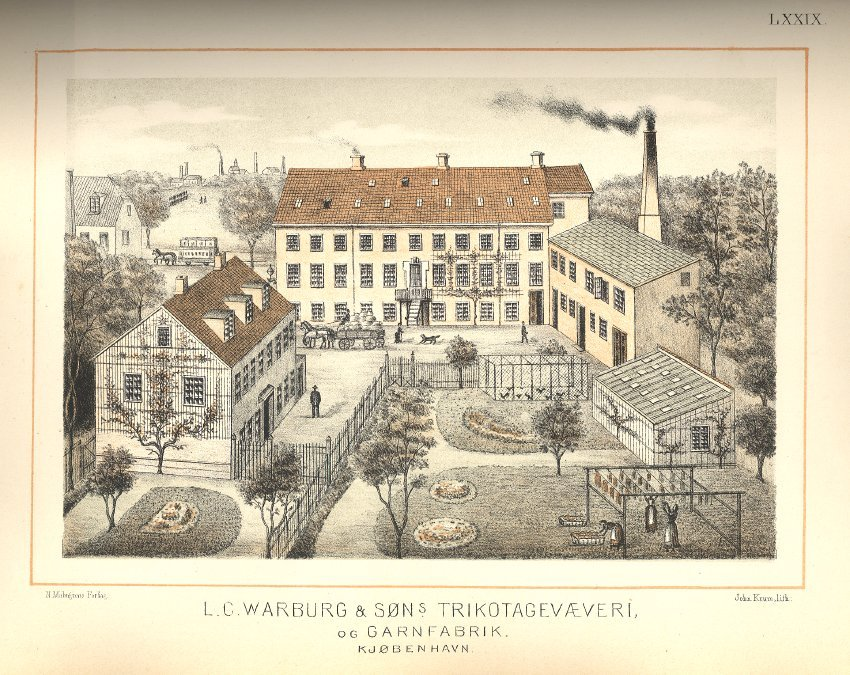
L. C. Warburg's stockings factory

From the middle of the 19th century, the narrow lots came into other use, first for construction of smaller industrial enterprises and later apartment buildings, although the last bleacher did not disappear until 1867.

Jørgen Ernst Meyer established one of the first factories at the street in 1842. Another early industrial enterprise was L. C. Warburg's stockings factory. O.F. Asp established a candle factory at the street in 1880.

== Notable buildings and residents ==
=== Sankt Hans Torv to Fredensgade ===
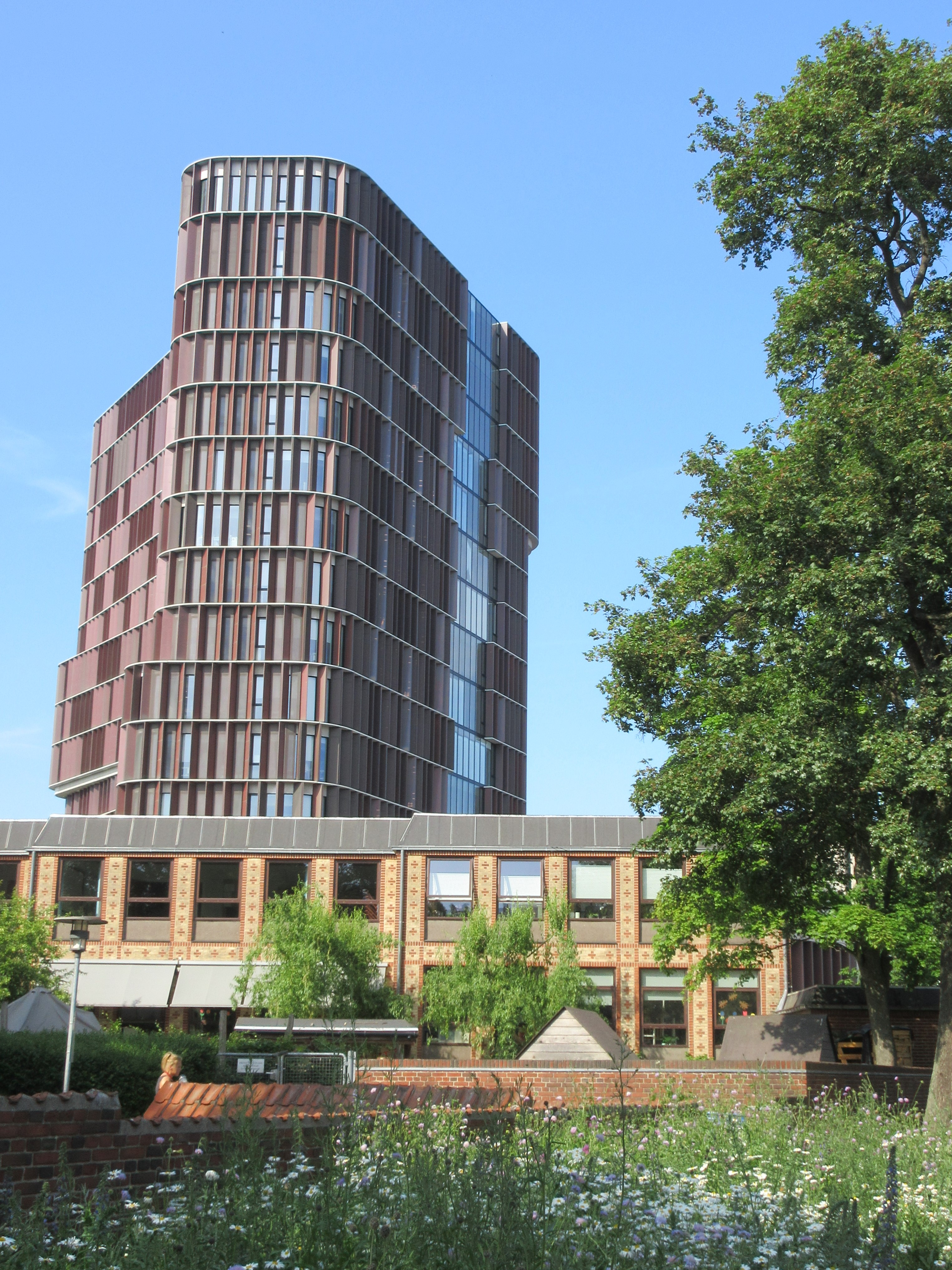
The Mærsk Tower

Completed in 1861, St. John's Church (No. 1) was the first church to be built in the new districts which developed after Copenhagen's Bastioned Fortifications were decommissioned. The Neo-Gothic church was designed by Theodor Sørensen and remains the largest church building in the Nørrebro district.

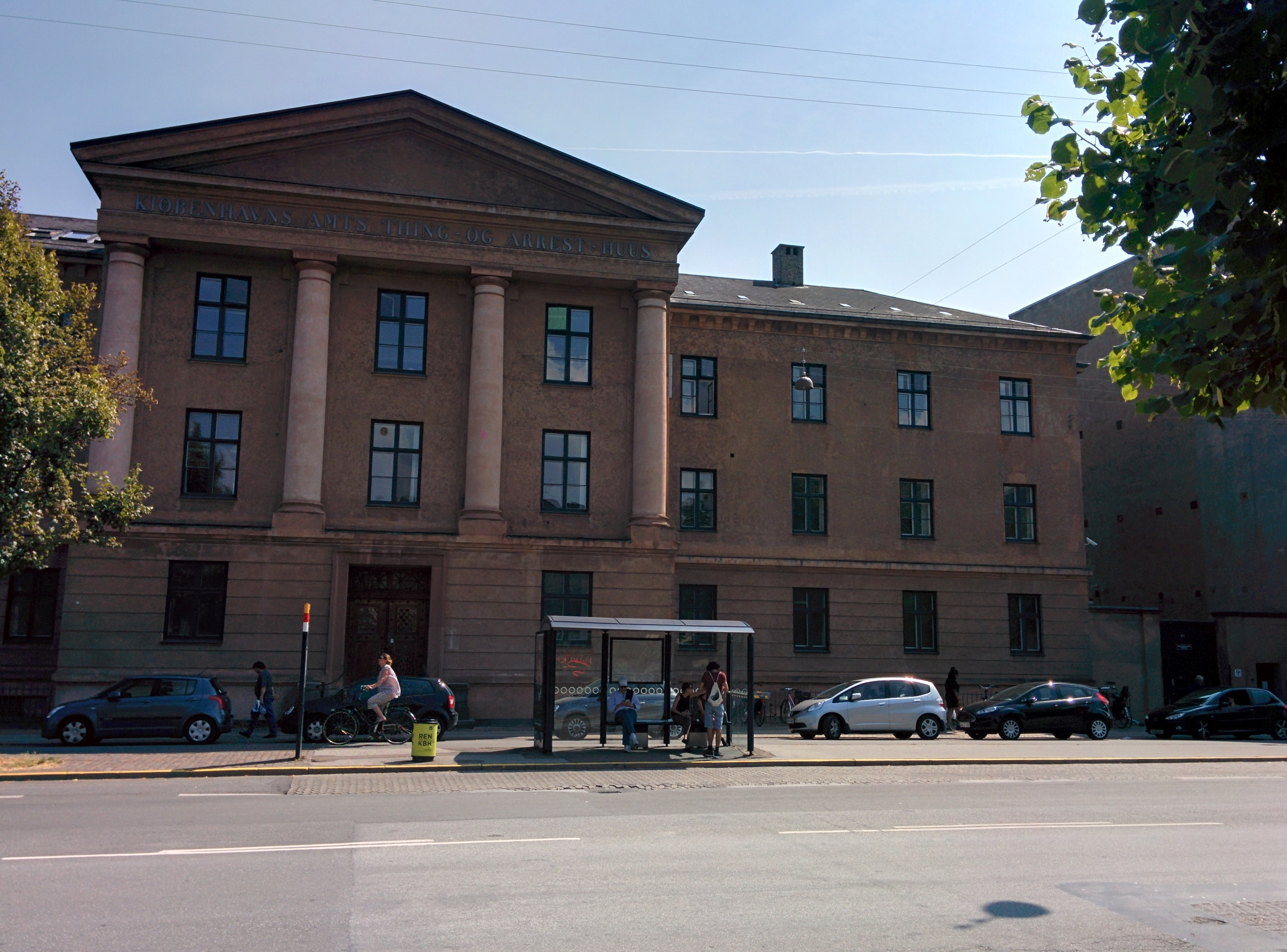
No. 3: Blegdamsvej Prison

The Panum Institute (No 3) is part of University of Copenhagen's North Campus. The Panum Building was constructed in the 1970s. The Mærck Tower was added in 2018.

Blegdamsvej Prison (No. 6) is the oldest prison still in use in Denmark. It was designed by Michael Gottlieb Bindesbøll and inaugurated in 1848 but has later been expanded and modernized several times.

=== Fredensgade to Trianglen ===
Rigshospitalet (No. 9) dominates the north side of the Østerbro section of the street. The current hospital is from 1960 to 1978 and was designed by Kaj Boeck-Hansen and Jørgen Stærmose. An extension designed by 3XN went under construction in 2017.

The Niels Bohr Institute (No. 15-17) from 1922 has housed the work of several Nobel Prize-winners. No. 23, roughly from the same time, is the Freemasons' Hall. The Danish branch of the Red Cross has its head office at No. 25–27. The building was built in 1952 and is the former headquarters of Copenhagen County. It has more recently been expanded by COBE Architects.

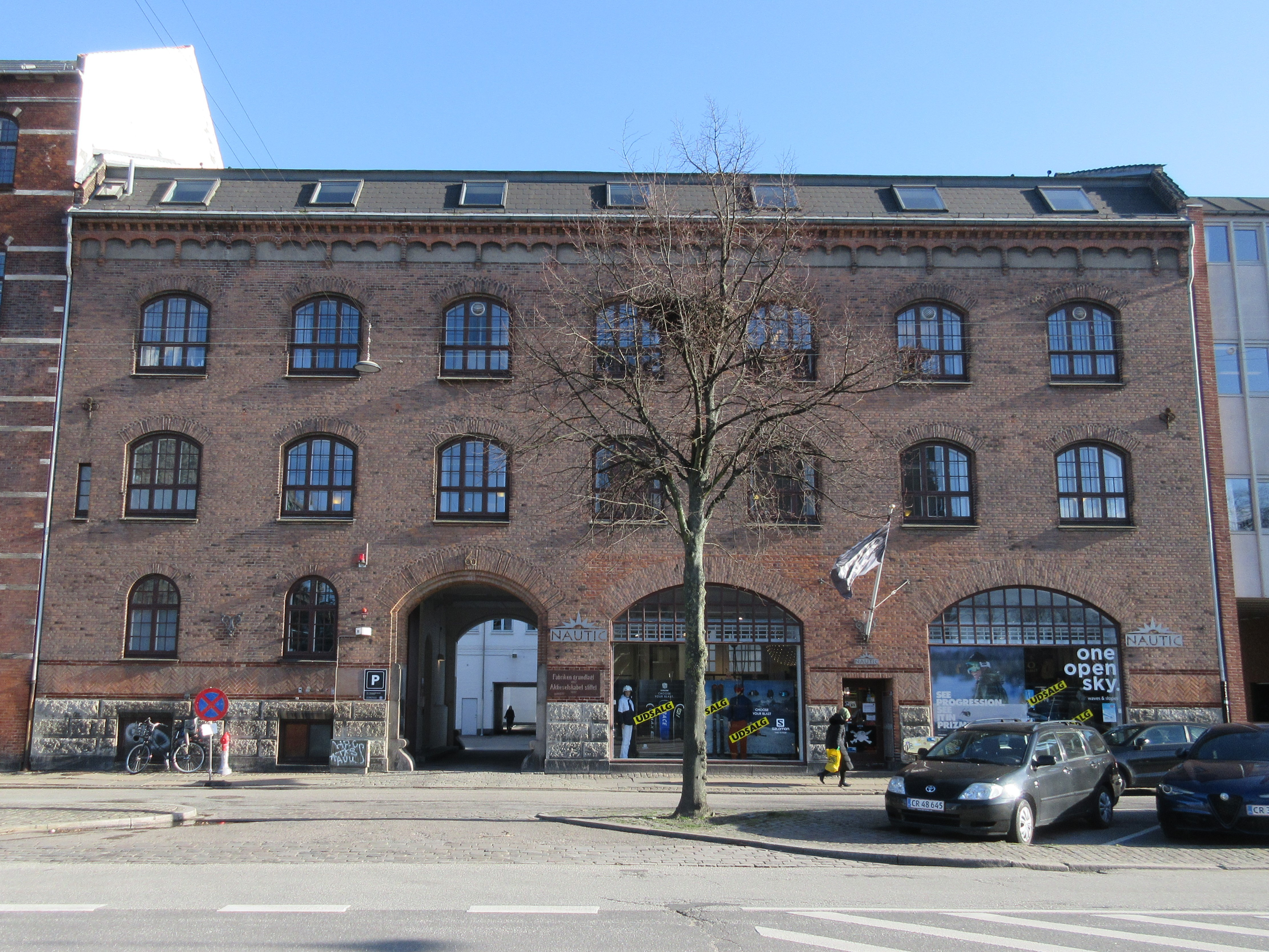
No.60: Nielsen & Winther's former building

No. 60 is a former machine factory, Nielsen & Winther. The building is from 1899 and was designed by Axel Berg. Its neighbor (No. 62), slightly older and designed by Ludvig Fenger, was originally a public school but later taken over by Nielsen & Winther.

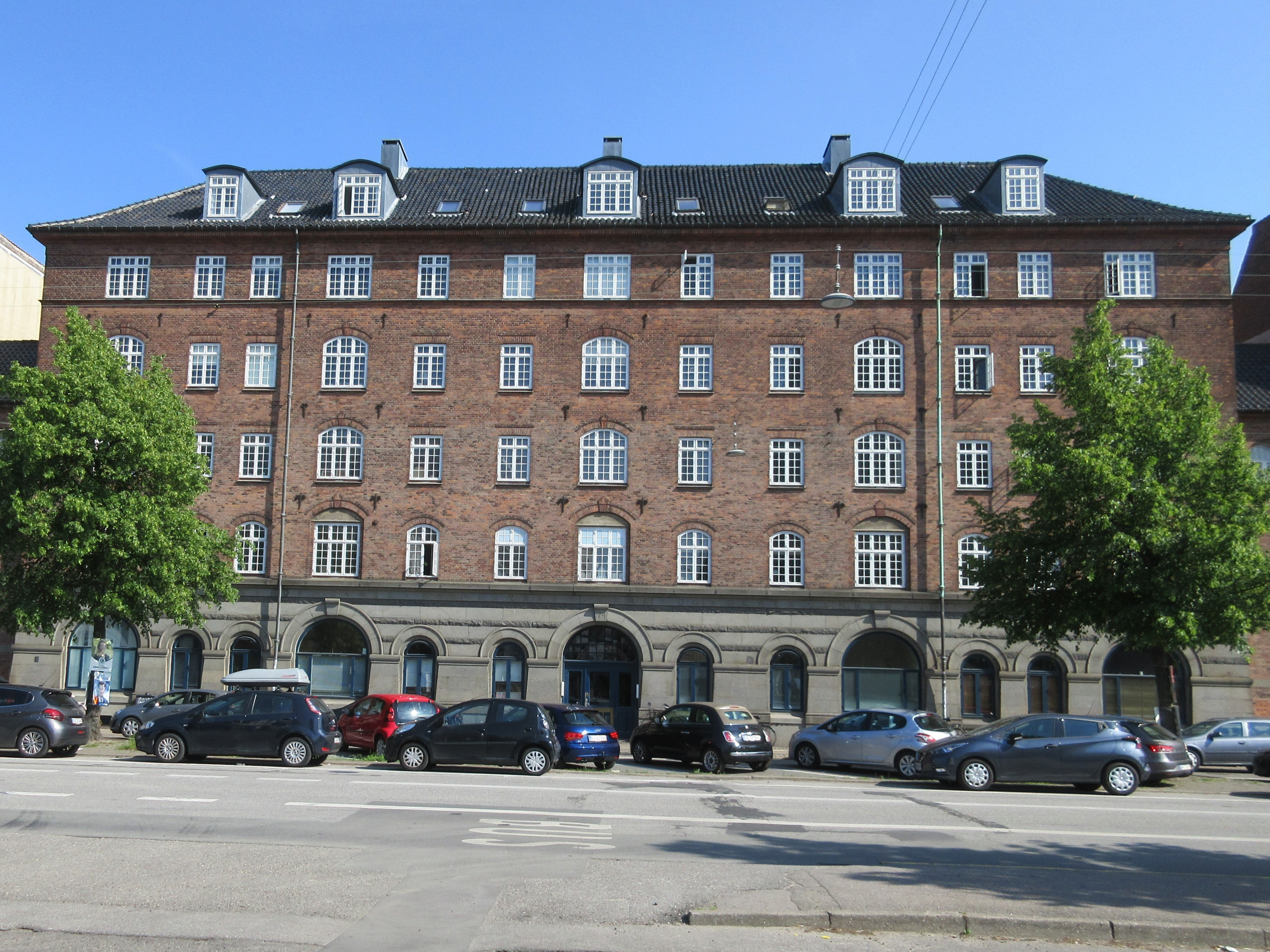
No. 74: Håndværkerstiftelsen

Håndværkerstiftelsen (No. 74) was built to provide affordable housing for old, indigent craftsmen and their widows. The National Romantic building is from 1901 to 1902 and was designed by Emil Jørgensen.

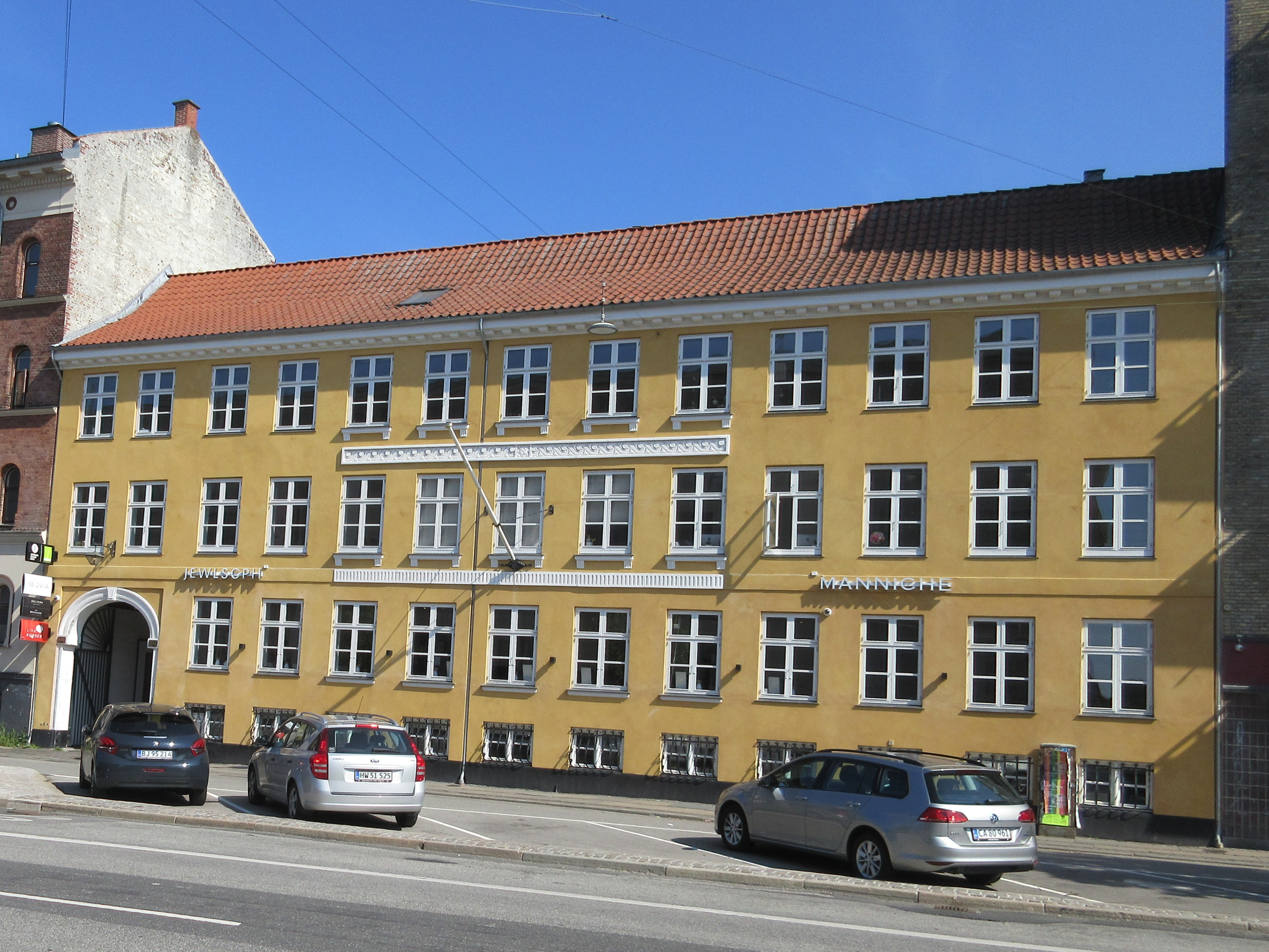
No. 104: The Asp-Holmblad Building

No. 104 is a former candle manufactury, Asp-Holmblad, which was in use until the 1940s but has now been converted into apartments. No. 124 was designed by Frederik Lauritz Levy for the company Siemens-Schuckert.

No. 132 (Trianglen) is a former tram remise built by De kjøbenhavnske Sporvejes in 1900–02 to design by Vilhelm Friederichsen. It was converted into an after school activity centre in the 1980s.

== Public art ==
At Rigshospitalet, on the corner of Blegdamsvej with Fredensgade, is Rudolph Tegner's large group sculpture Towards the Light. It was installed in 1909 as a memorial to the physician and scientist Niels Ryberg Finsen who won the Nobel Prize in Medicine and Physiology in 1903.

In the small garden in front of the Niels Bohr Institute stands a 7-8 metre tall granite sculpture by the Swedish sculptor Claes Hake. It was unveiled in 1999.

== Transport ==
Trianglen Station at the eastern end of the street is part of the City Circle Line, which was inaugurated in September 2019.

Movia bus 3A runs through the full length of the street on its way between Nordhavn station in the northeast and Valbyparken in the southwest.

A BRT line between Nørreport station in the city centre and Ryparken station on Ringbanen crosses the street at Fredensgade. It is served by up to 47 busses per hour per direction transporting approx. 30,000 passengers per day. One of the stations of the under construction City Circle Line will be located on the corner of Nørre Allé and Jagtvej at Vibenhus Eunddel.

== See also ==
- Sortedam Dossering
