= Swedish Order of Freemasons =

Swedish fraternal order of freemasonry

Cross of the Swedish Order of Freemasons

The Swedish Order of Freemasons (Swedish: Svenska Frimurare Orden) is a Swedish fraternal order of freemasonry, founded in 1735 as the oldest active Swedish fraternal order. It is the native Swedish manifestation of Swedish Rite Freemasonry, recognised by the United Grand Lodge of England as a Regular Masonic jurisdictions. The total membership is 16,500.

== Organisation ==
The members are divided in 43 St John's (Craft) lodges (degrees I-III), 23 St Andrew's lodges for degrees IV-VI, and 7 Chapters for degrees VII-X. There is also a lodge of research and a stewards' lodge. Additionally 63 recognised "fraternal societies" provide masonic fellowship in rural communities considered too small to support a working lodge.

In addition there are 1,300 members in Finland in 7 St John's lodges, 2 St Andrew's lodges, and 1 Grand Chapter. While Finland has also a native Grand Lodge following American rite, the overlap of geographical jurisdictions has been agreed upon for decades and the two Grand Lodges are in perfect amity.

== Membership ==
According to all Swedish Rite constitutions, all members must be men with a Christian spirit. It is also required that one must be sponsored by two members of the Order in order to become a member.

The Swedish Order of Freemasons, Grand Lodge of Sweden is an organisation, where men from various walks of life meet in a Christian spirit to fully develop their personal maturation potential, and in dignified circumstances to meet fellow men.

== Female adoption lodge: Le véritable et constante amitié ==
Women Freemasons seem to have been introduced early in Sweden, though the information is scarce: according to documents of the Swedish Freemasons, Hedvig Charlotta Nordenflycht was in 1747 the Grand Mistress of in a certain "Ordre de la resemblance", which can thus be interpreted as a Women's Lodge of Adoption. However, a confirmed Women's Lodge does not appear until the 1770s.

On 2 May 1776, the Grand Master of the Swedish Freemasonic Order, Duke Charles, had his spouse, Hedvig Elisabeth Charlotte of Holstein-Gottorp, inaugurated as the Grand Mistress of a female lodge of adoption to his own lodge at the Royal Palace, Stockholm, named "Le véritable et constante amitié". This new woman's lodge of adoption was confirmed by seal from Grand Master of the French Freemasonic Order, Louis Philippe II, Duke of Orléans, and the Grand Mistress of the French Woman's Lodge of Adoption, Bathilde d'Orléans, on 8 May 1776. The Women's Lodge of Adoption was organized by rules set by Duchess Charlotte in three grades with a ritual in five grades after a French model, and met in the same rooms in the apartments of Duke Charles in the Royal Palace where the male lodge met. In addition to Duchess Charlotte herself, Sophie von Fersen and Hedvig Eleonora von Fersen, both introduced in 1776, are confirmed as members of the Lodge of Adoption, and Charlotte Stierneld is likely to have been member of the same lodge, as she was named as "already a Freemason" when she was introduced in the Yellow Rose Lodge. It is unknown how long the Lodge of Adoption was active, but it is likely that it functioned at least until 1789, when Duchess Charlotte mentioned that Duke Charles allowed her to participate in "secret gatherings" to explore the occult, and perhaps until the foundation of the short lived Co-Masonic Lodge Yellow Rose Lodge in 1802, but was surely abolished in 1803, when all secret societies at court were banned.

== See also ==
- Freemasonry in Sweden
- Swedish Rite
