= Freemasonry in Sweden =

Freemasonry in Sweden was introduced by the Swedish Order of Freemasons, founded in 1735 as the oldest still active Swedish fraternal order, working the Swedish Rite of Freemasonry. It is under royal patronage of the King of Sweden and closely associated with the Lutheran Church of Sweden. It is a jurisdiction that admits Christian men only, and is recognised by the United Grand Lodge of England as a Regular Masonic jurisdiction. Its total membership is about 16,500.

There is also a minor presence of several other masonic systems operating in Sweden on a smaller scale.

== History ==
Freemasonry was brought to Sweden in 1735 by Axel Wrede Sparre, with a Grand Lodge established 1760. In 1756 Carl Friedrich Eckleff established the first St Andrew's lodge in Stockholm to work additional degrees, beyond the three initial degrees of Craft Freemasonry. A Grand Chapter was erected in 1759. Eckleff's ideas of a truly progressive system building upon the internationally recognised three degrees (of Entered Apprentice, Fellow Craft, and Master Mason) was further developed by Duke Karl of Södermanland, who later became Charles XIII of Sweden. As Grand Master of the Swedish Order of Freemasons he developed the system, which by 1800 had fully evolved into the Swedish Rite system, which has since experienced only very minor development. The Swedish system has since spread to Finland (under Swedish control), and also to Norway, Denmark, and Iceland under independent national Grand Lodges.

== Swedish Order of Freemasons ==
The Swedish Order of Freemasons (Swedish: Svenska Frimurare Orden) is the native Swedish manifestation of Swedish Rite Freemasonry. It is recognised by the United Grand Lodge of England, and stands in the body of regular world Freemasonry. It has 43 St John's (Craft) lodges (degrees I-III), 23 St Andrew's lodges for degrees IV-VI, and 7 Chapters for degrees VII-X. There is also a lodge of research and a stewards' lodge. Additionally 63 recognised "fraternal societies" provide masonic fellowship in rural communities considered too small to support a working lodge. Membership in Sweden is 15,200. In addition there are 1,300 members in Finland in 7 St John's lodges, 2 St Andrew's lodges, and 1 Grand Chapter. The total membership is 16,500. While Finland has also a native Grand Lodge following American rite, the overlap of geographical jurisdictions has been agreed upon for decades and the two Grand Lodges are in perfect amity.

As with all Swedish Rite constitutions, all members must be Christian men. Visitors of any religion from recognised foreign jurisdictions (including Swedish freemasons of the Swedish District Grand Lodge of the Grand Lodge of Finland) may attend lodge meetings, but visitors attending the chapter degrees (from grade VII onwards) must be recognised as Christians, or sign a statement asserting that they are Christians.

There is a close relationship with the Lutheran Church of Sweden (Swedish: Svenska kyrkan), which is the established national church of Sweden. Priests and bishops of the Church of Sweden have a special role within the Swedish Rite of Freemasonry, particularly in grade VII and above.

=== Royal Order of Scotland ===
The Royal Order of Scotland has never formed part of the Swedish Rite, but in 2000 a Provincial Grand Lodge of the Order was reestablished in Stockholm, the original from 1852, with members of the Swedish Rite permitted to join it as a side degree, or appendant body, with current Provincial Grand Master that is Sir Ulf Lindgren. A second Provincial Grand Lodge was established in 2002 in Kristianstad and a third in 2016 in Linköping, with current Provincial Grand Master that is Sir Johan Holmér. It admits only Christian men who are VII grade (or above) members of the Swedish Order of Freemasons, and strictly by invitation only.

== Other masonic systems ==
Several other masonic orders have or had a minority presence in Sweden.

=== Female adoption lodge: Le véritable et constante amitié ===
Women Freemasons seem to have been introduced early in Sweden, though the information in scarce: according to documents of the Swedish Freemasons, Hedvig Charlotta Nordenflycht was in 1747 the Grand Mistress of in a certain Ordre de la resemblance, which can thus be interpreted as a Women's Lodge of Adoption. However, a confirmed Women's Lodge does not appear until the 1770s.

On 2 May 1776, the Grand Master of the Swedish Freemasonic Order, Duke Charles, had his spouse, Hedvig Elisabeth Charlotte of Holstein-Gottorp, inaugurated as the Grand Mistress of a female lodge of adoption to his own lodge at the Royal Palace, Stockholm, named Le véritable et constante amitié. This new woman's lodge of adoption was confirmed by seal from Grand Master of the French Freemasonic Order, Louis Philippe II, Duke of Orléans, and the Grand Mistress of the French Woman's Lodge of Adoption, Bathilde d'Orléans, on 8 May 1776. The Woman's Lodge of Adoption was organized by rules set by Duchess Charlotte in three grades with a ritual in five grades after a French role model, and had their meetings in the same rooms in the apartments of Duke Charles in the Royal Palace where the male lodge also had their meetings. Except Duchess Charlotte herself, Sophie von Fersen and Hedvig Eleonora von Fersen, both introduced in 1776, are confirmed as members of the Lodge of Adoption, and Charlotte Stierneld are likely to have been member of the same lodge, as she was named as "already a Freemason" when she was introduced in the Yellow Rose Lodge. It is unknown how long the Lodge of Adoption was active, but it is likely that is functioned at least until 1789, when duchess Charlotte mention how duke Charles allowed her to participate in "secret gatherings" to explore the occult, and perhaps as long as until the foundation of the short lived Co-Masonic Lodge Yellow Rose Lodge in 1802, but was surely abolished in 1803, when all secret societies at court was banned.

=== Le Droit Humain ===
The International Order of Freemasonry for Men and Women, or Le Droit Humain, came to Sweden in 1918, when a lodge was established in Stockholm. A second lodge in Gothenburg was short-lived. Being a co-masonic obedience it admits both men and women. Today, there are four Le Droit Humain lodges in Sweden (two in Stockholm, one in Vänersborg and one in Malmö), which are linked administratively with others across Scandinavia. Lodges use either the "Lauderdale" or "George Martin" versions of the three craft degrees, as well as various high degrees (especially of the Ancient and Accepted Scottish Rite, which is the main ritual system for the entirety of Le Droit Humain). link is broken, no known active lodge under le droit humain in Sweden at this time (2024)

=== Swedish Masonic Camp ===
The Swedish Masonic Camp (Swedish: Svenska Frimurare Lägret) was a system established in 1951 using Craft and Royal Arch warrants that John Trollnäs had received in the 1930s from the Grand Lodge of Hamburg. He also received from the Supreme Council in Leipzig warrants to work the Scottish Rite and the Memphis Rite. Five lodges were established during the 1950s at Lund, Halmstad, Gothenburg and Helsingborg in southern Sweden. Even at its 1960s highpoint membership was just 350, and during the 1970s and 1980s both membership and activity decreased. All five lodges closed, the last in 2006. A small group of former members revived the order in 2009 with lodges in Stockholm and Simrishamn. It accepts male members who believe in a Supreme Being. It works the craft degrees, the Holy Royal Arch, the Order of Mark Master Masons, the Order of Royal and Select Masters, the Order of High Priests, and the Royal Ark Mariner degree. It has a goal of reviving in Sweden the Ancient and Accepted Scottish Rite and the Rite of Memphis. Det Svenska frimurarlägret seezed all activity in 2011

=== Gran Oriente Latinoamericano ===
Gran Oriente Latinoamericano is a co-masonic (mixed male and female) system introduced into Sweden in 1984. It has lodges in Stockholm, Norrköping and Södertälje. It works the French Rite (Rite Français), and does not require a belief in a Supreme Being amongst its members.

=== Grand Lodge of Finland ===
Since early 2010s, the Grand Lodge of Finland has operated a district grand lodge of Sweden with the permission of the Swedish Rite. The lodges chartered by the Grand Lodge of Finland work using a Swedish-language version of the Finnish ritual, which is a close successor of the ritual used by the Grand Lodge of State of New York. The lodges require that candidates are men who profess faith in a Supreme Being and the immortality of soul.

The Swedish district grand lodge is in full amity with the Swedish rite, and the grand master of the Swedish Order of Freemasons has participated in inauguration of Finnish-rite lodges.

== See also ==
- Swedish Rite
- Le Droit Humain
