= Schröder Rite =

Schröder Rite (in German: Schrödersche Lehrart) is a masonic rite practiced mostly in lodges in Germany and Brazil, with fewer lodges in other countries. Developed by Friedrich Ludwig Schröder and showed to Masters in Hamburg on July 29, 1801, it was adopted unanimously and it attracted several lodges throughout Germany and other countries, where it was practiced mainly by Freemasons of German origin and soon received the name of its founder, Schröder Rite.
