= Norwegian Order of Freemasons =

Masonic Grand Lodge

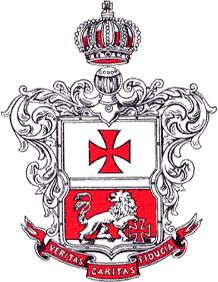

The Norwegian Order of Freemasons (Norwegian: Den Norske Frimurerorden) is the Masonic Grand Lodge in Norway. The first lodge (St. Olai Lodge - Later changed to Lodge St. Olaus to the white Leopard) was opened in 1749 and is still working. The Grand Lodge has followed the Swedish Rite since 1818, which requires its members to adhere to Christianity. During the union of Sweden-Norway, the Swedish-Norwegian king was Grand Master of the Order. The sovereign Grand Lodge of Norway was consecrated in 1891. As of 2009, the Order has about 20,000 members.

The Order consists of 63 lodges of St. John (Iº – IIIº), 19 lodges of St. Andrew (IVº – VIº), three Steward lodges of 2. order (VII º), four Steward lodges of 1. order (VIIº – VIIIº), three Provincial lodges (VIIº – Xº), the Grand lodge (VIIº – XIIº) and one research lodge.

The order is headquartered in Oslo, with a large building next to the Norwegian Parliament.

== Founding lodges of the order ==
=== Lodge St. Olaus to the white leopard ===
Lodge St. Olaus to the white leopard (Danish: St. Olaus til den hvide leopard) was established on June 24, 1749 on the island of Ladegaard, in the building of Bygdøy Kongsgaard in Christiania. The original name of the lodge was St. Olai, and it was named after the Norwegian king Olaf the Holy one (Olai is a Latin genitive form of Olav). In 1780 the lodge changed its name to Saint Olaus to the white leopard.

In 1785, the second City Hall of Christiana (built 1733) was bought by St. Olai Lodge. The inauguration of the lodge rooms was carried out by Bernt Anker, and the lodge had its residence in the ground floor and the first floor until 1811. Today, the lodge resides inside the headquarters of the Norwegian Order of Freemasons in Nedre Vollgt. 19, Oslo, as a neighbour building of the Norwegian Storting.

The coat of arms of the Lodge carries the Latin inscription Artis Ope Ferociam Exuit, meaning "With the help of the Art, it (the leopard) shall get rid of its wildness (or rage)."

St. Olai Lodge was the first Masonic lodge in Norway, and the mother lodge of many lodges in the Norwegian Order of Freemasons. It was founded by Count Christian Conrad Danneskiold-Laurvig, probably with the Danish king Frederick V of Denmark present at the initiation ceremony. The lodge is an offshoot of the Danish lodge St. Martin which existed in Copenhagen from 1743 to 1767.

==== Nationality ====
The lodge received its directives from Danish Freemasonic lodges from 1749 to 1818. Its first mother lodge was «St. Martin», founded in Copenhagen in 1743. In 1745, the lodge «Zorobabel», also in Copenhagen, was founded as an offshoot of «St. Martin», with a Patent from the Premier Grand Lodge of England dated 25 October 1745. The two lodges «St. Martin» and «Zorobabel» was unified into the new lodge «Zorobabel to the Northern Star» on 9 January 1767, upon which the new lodge became the new directing lodge of St. Olaus.

In 1818, due to the union between Norway and Sweden, the lodge St. Olaus to the white leopard became a member of The Swedish Order of Freemasons. The lodge was one of the six founding members of the Norwegian Order of Freemasons («Province X») on 24 June 1891.

==== Rites ====
On its foundations in 1749, St Olaus was a pure lodge of St. John, a «blue lodge» practising the Craft degrees. In 1752 the lodge also gradually began to practise the high degrees of Rite of Strict Observance. The establishment of the rites was finished in 1762 and was practised in cooperation with the Copenhagen-lodges until 1782.

The rectified rite was introduced in Denmark and Norway in 1782. It was influenced by French Freemasonry and was less concerned with Christian institutions. Among other things, it removed the legend about the Knights Templars from the teachings.

In 1818, St. Olaus became directed from the Swedish Grand lodge, and in 1819 it was transformed into a «blue lodge» of St. John practising the three Craft degrees since then.

=== St. Andrew lodge Oscar to the burning star ===
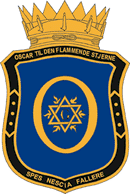
Coat of arms of Lodge Oscar til den flammende Stjerne

The St. Andrew lodge Oscar to the burning star (Norwegian: Oscar til den flammende Stjerne) sometimes known as Lodge of St. Andrew no. 1, was founded in Drammen in 1826 as a Craft lodge, practising the three degrees of St. John. After having delivered an application to the Swedish Grand Lodge, it was moved to Christiana and elevated to a St. Andrew lodge practising the Scottish degrees of St. Andrew (IV°-VI°) of the Swedish Rite. The Act of capitulation as a lodge of St. John was formulated on 10 April 1836. Its constituting patent as a lodge of St. Andrew was then worked out on 10 April 1841.

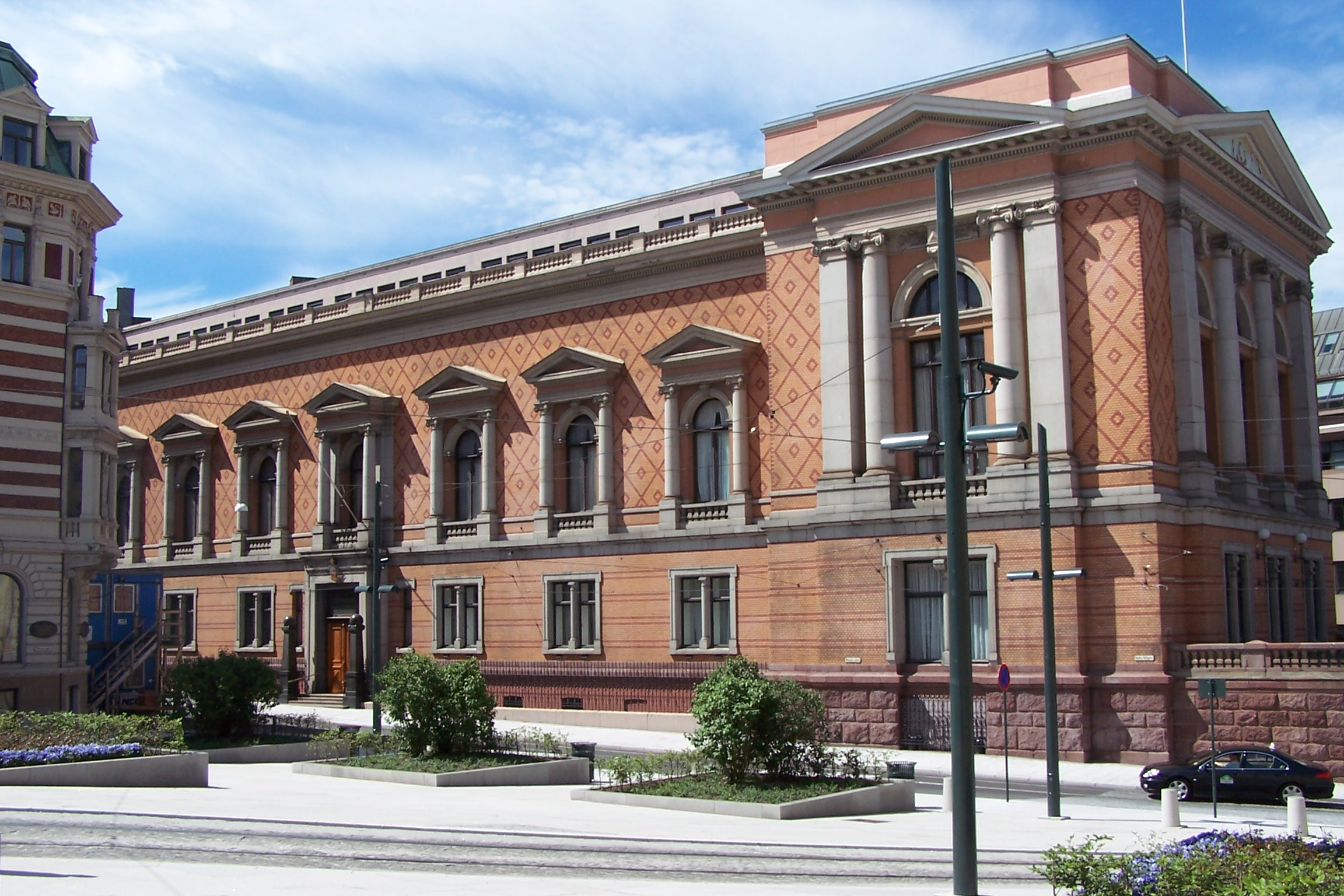
Main lodge building (stamhus) of the Norwegian Order of Freemasons in the centre of Oslo, next to the Parliament

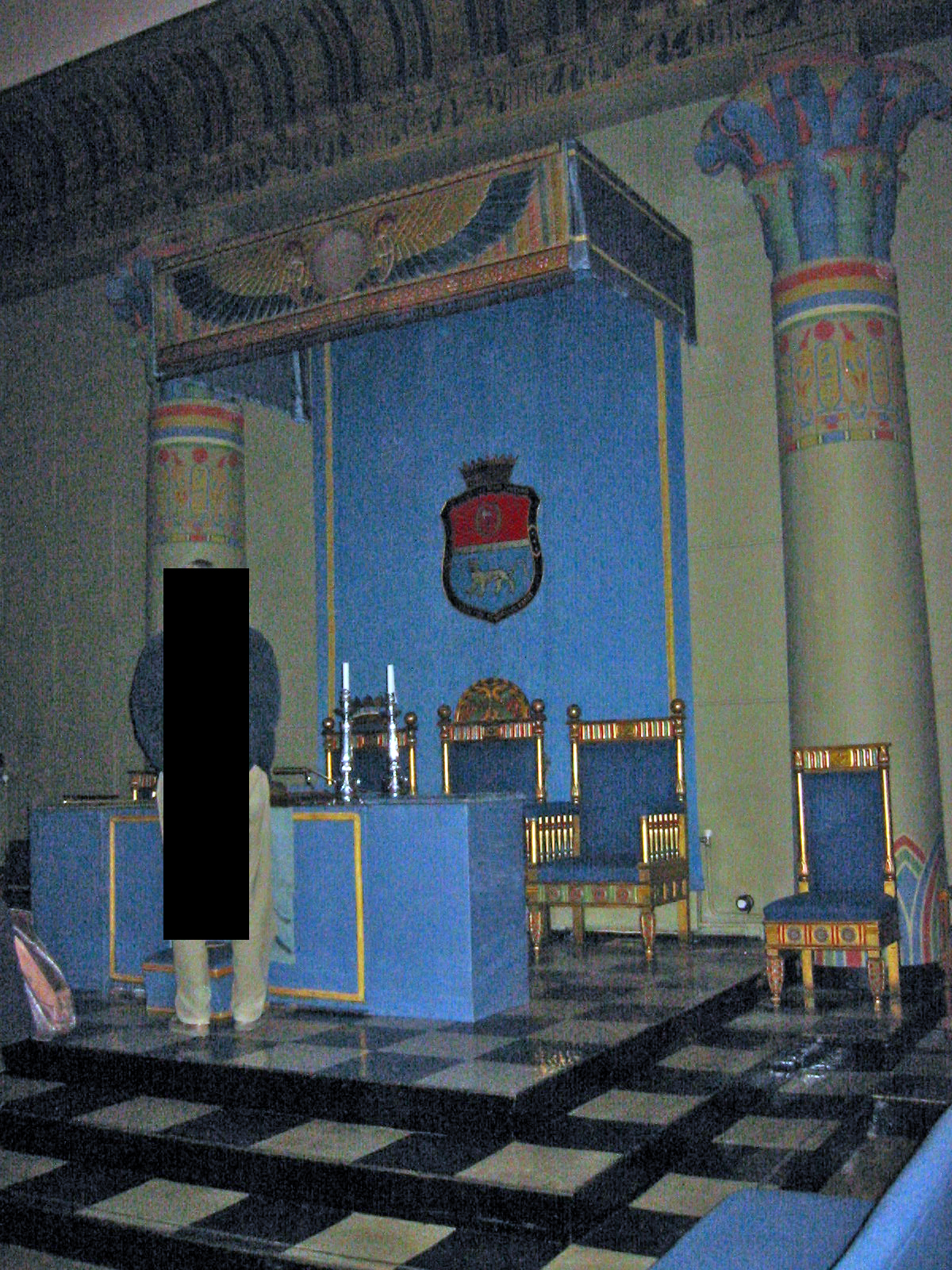
Internal view of the main lodge building of the Norwegian Order of Freemasons

== References and notes ==
=== Bibliography ===
- Gould, Robert Freke (1887). Gould's History of Freemasonry Throughout the World, Volume III. Charles Scribner's Sons.
- Karl Ludvig Tørrisen Bugge: St. Johs. Logen St. Olaus Til Den Hvide Leopard i Kristiania 1749-1757-1907, Jubileumsskrift 1907.
- Kr. Thorbjørnsen: St. Olai Brødre. Blad av St. Johs. Logen. St. Olaus til den hvide Leopards historie gjennom 200 år, 1947, printed as a manuscript for brothers (Masons).
- Matrikkel over Den Norske Frimurerorden for arbeidsåret 1996/97, Aktietrykkeriet i Trondhjem
- Matrikkel over Den Norske Frimurerorden for arbeidsåret 2007, Aktietrykkeriet i Trondhjem
