= History of Freemasonry =

The history of Freemasonry encompasses the origins, evolution and defining events of the fraternal organisation known as Freemasonry. It covers three phases. Firstly, the emergence of organised lodges of operative masons during the Middle Ages, then the admission of lay members as "accepted" (a term reflecting the ceremonial "acception" process that made non-stone masons members of an operative lodge) or "speculative" masons, and finally the evolution of purely speculative lodges, and the emergence of Grand Lodges to govern them. The watershed in this process is generally taken to be the formation of the first Grand Lodge in London on the Gregorian 24 June 1717. The two difficulties facing historians are the paucity of written material, even down to the 19th century, and the misinformation generated by masons and non-masons alike from the earliest years.

Freemasonry's long history includes its early development from organised bodies of operative stonemasons to the modern system of speculative lodges organised around regional or national "Grand Lodges".

== Origin myths and theories ==
=== Early Masonic sources ===
The earliest masonic texts each contain some sort of a history of the craft of masonry. The oldest known work of this type, the Halliwell Manuscript (also known as Regius Poem) dates from between 1390 and 1425. This document has a brief history in its introduction, stating that the "craft of masonry" began with Euclid in Egypt, and came to England in the reign of King Athelstan (924–939). Shortly afterwards, the Matthew Cooke Manuscript traces masonry to Jabal, son of Lamech (Genesis 4: 20–22), and tells how this knowledge came to Euclid, from him to the Children of Israel (while they were in Egypt), and so on through an elaborate path to Athelstan. This myth formed the basis for subsequent manuscript constitutions, all tracing masonry back to biblical times, and fixing its institutional establishment in England during the reign of Athelstan.

Shortly after the formation of the Premier Grand Lodge of England, James Anderson was commissioned to digest these "Gothic Constitutions" in a palatable, modern form. The resulting constitutions are prefaced by a history more extensive than any before, again tracing the history of what was now freemasonry back to biblical roots, again forging Euclid into the chain. True to his material, Anderson fixes the first grand assembly of English Masons at York, under Athelstan's son, Edwin, who is otherwise unknown to history. Expanded, revised, and republished, Anderson's 1738 constitutions listed the Grand Masters since Augustine of Canterbury, listed as Austin the Monk. William Preston's Illustrations of Freemasonry enlarged and expanded on this masonic creation myth.

In France, the 1737 lecture of Chevalier Ramsay added the crusaders to the lineage. He maintained that Crusader Masons had revived the craft with secrets recovered in the Holy Land, under the patronage of the Knights Hospitaller. At this point, the history of the craft in Continental Freemasonry diverged from that in England.

=== Speculative histories ===
Anderson's histories of 1723 and 1738, Ramsay's romanticisation, together with the internal allegory of masonic ritual, centred on King Solomon’s Temple and its architect, Hiram Abiff, have provided ample material for further speculation.

The earliest known ritual places the first masonic lodge in the porchway of King Solomon’s Temple. Following Anderson, it has also been possible to trace Freemasonry to Euclid, Pythagoras, Moses, the Essenes, and the Culdees. Preston started his history with the Druids, while Anderson's description of masons as "Noachides", extrapolated by Albert Mackey, put Noah into the equation.

Following Ramsay's introduction of Crusader masons, the Knights Templar became involved in the myth, starting with Karl Gotthelf von Hund's Rite of Strict Observance, which also linked in the exiled House of Stuart. The murder of Hiram Abiff was taken as an allegory for the death of Charles I of England. Oliver Cromwell emerges as the founder of Freemasonry in an anonymous anti-masonic work of 1745, commonly attributed to Abbé Larudan. Mackey states that "The propositions of Larudan are distinguished for their absolute independence of all historical authority and for the bold assumptions which are presented to the reader in the place of facts." The anti-masonic writings of Christoph Friedrich Nicolai implicated Francis Bacon and the Rosicrucians, while Christopher Wren's connection with the craft was omitted from Anderson's first book of constitutions, but appeared in the second when Wren was dead.

The seed or the myth of Stuart Jacobite influence on Freemasonry may have been a careless and unsubstantiated remark made by John Noorthouk in the 1784 Book of Constitutions of the Premier Grand Lodge of London. It was stated, without support, that King Charles II (older brother and predecessor to James II) was made a Freemason in the Netherlands during the years of his exile (1649–60). However, there were no documented lodges of Freemasons on the continent during those years. The statement may have been made to flatter the fraternity by claiming a previous monarch as a member. This folly was then embellished by John Robison (1739–1805), a professor of Natural Philosophy at the University of Edinburgh, in his 1797 work Proofs of a Conspiracy, an anti-Masonic polemic accusing Freemasonry of being infiltrated by Weishaupt's Order of the Illuminati. The lack of scholarship exhibited by Robison in that work caused the Encyclopædia Britannica to denounce it.

A German bookseller and Freemason, living in Paris, working under the assumed name of C. Lenning, embellished the story further in a manuscript titled "Encyclopedia of Freemasonry" probably written between 1822 and 1828 at Leipzig. This manuscript was later revised and published by another German Freemason named Friedrich Mossdorf (1757–1830). Lenning stated that King James II of England, after his flight to France in 1688, resided at the Jesuit College of Clermont, where his followers fabricated certain degrees for the purpose of carrying out their political ends.

By the mid-19th century, the story had gained currency. The well-known English Masonic writer, Dr. George Oliver (1782–1867), in his Historical Landmarks, 1846, carried the story forward and even claimed that King Charles II was active in his attendance at meetings—an obvious invention, for if it had been true, it would not have escaped the notice of the historians of the time.

Similarly, attempts to root Freemasonry in the French Compagnonnage have produced no concrete links. Connections to the Roman Collegia and Comacine masters are similarly tenuous, although some Freemasons see them as exemplars rather than ancestors. Thomas Paine traced Freemasonry to Ancient Egypt, as did Cagliostro, who went so far as to supply the ritual.

More recently, several authors have attempted to link the Templars to the timeline of Freemasonry through the imagery of the carvings in Rosslyn Chapel in Scotland, where the Templars are rumoured to have sought refuge after the dissolution of the order. In The Hiram Key, Robert Lomas and Christopher Knight describe a timeline starting in ancient Egypt, and taking in Jesus, the Templars, and Rosslyn before arriving at modern Freemasonry. These claims are challenged by Robert Cooper, the curator of the Grand Lodge of Scotland's library and museum, in his book The Rosslyn Hoax.

=== Emergence of modern masonic studies ===
The first rational study of masonic history was published in Germany, but Georg Kloss's 1847 work, Geschichte der Freimaurerei in England, Irland und Schottland was never translated. When Findel's History of Freemasonry was translated from German to English in 1866, Woodford in England and Murray-Lyon in Scotland were already active writers on the subject. Woodford was Findel's guide when he visited York to inspect manuscripts, and would shortly collaborate with Hughan in collecting, dating and classifying the old manuscript constitutions. Albert Mackey was no less active in America. The list of his published works start in 1844 with "A Lexicon of Freemasonry", and extend to his monumental Encyclopedia of Freemasonry in 1874. Increasing interest, and participation, in masonic studies led, in 1886, to the formation in London of Quatuor Coronati Lodge, the first lodge dedicated to masonic research.

== From origin to Grand Lodge Freemasonry ==
=== Origin of the term "Freemason" ===
The earliest official English documents to refer to masons are written in Latin — "sculptores lapidum liberorum" (London 1212), "magister lathomus liberarum petrarum" (Oxford 1391) — or Norman French — "mestre mason de franche peer" (Statute of Labourers 1351 (25 Edw. 3. Stat. 2)). These all signify a worker in freestone, a grainless sandstone or limestone suitable for ornamental masonry. In the 17th century, building accounts of Wadham College the terms freemason and freestone mason are used interchangeably. Freemason also contrasts with "Rough Mason" or "Layer", as a more skilled worker who worked or laid dressed stone.

The adjective "free" in this context may also be taken to infer that the mason is not enslaved, indentured or feudally bound. While this is difficult to reconcile with medieval English masons, it apparently became important to Scottish operative lodges.

=== Master Masons in medieval England ===
A medieval Master Mason would be required to undergo what passed for a liberal education in those days. In England, he would leave home at nine or ten years of age already literate in English and French, educated at home or at the petty (junior) school. From then until the age of fourteen, he would attend monastery or grammar school to learn Latin, or as a page in a knightly household would learn deportment in addition to his studies. Between the ages of fourteen and seventeen, he would learn the basic skills of choosing, shaping, and combining stone and then between the ages of 17 and 21, be required to learn by rote a large number of formal problems in geometry. Three years as a journeyman would often finish with the submission of a masterwork dealing with a set problem in construction or design. At this point, he was considered qualified, but still had a career ladder to climb before attaining the status of Master Mason on a large project.

In his function as architect, the Master Mason probably made his plans for each successive stage of a build in silverpoint on a prepared parchment or board. These would be realised on the ground by using a larger compass than the one used for drafting. Medieval architects are depicted with much larger compasses and squares where they are shown on a building site. Fine detail was transferred from the drawing board by means of wooden templates supplied to the masons.

The Master Masons who appear in record as presiding over major works, such as York Minster, became wealthy and respected. Visiting Master Masons and Master Carpenters sat at high table of monasteries, dining with the abbot.

=== From the Middle Ages to the Reformation ===
The historical record shows two levels of organisation in medieval masonry, the lodge and the "guild". The original use of the word lodge indicates a workshop erected on the site of a major work, the first mention being Vale Royal Abbey in 1278. Later, it gained the secondary meaning of the community of masons in a particular place. The earliest surviving records of these are the laws and ordinances of the lodge at York Minster in 1352. These regulations were imposed by the Dean and Chapter of the Minster.

Nineteenth-century historians imposed the term "guild" on the "fellowships" of medieval tradesmen as an analogy with the merchant guilds. The masons were late in forming such bodies. The major employer of masons in medieval England was the crown, and the crown frequently employed masons by impressment. In other words, they were forcibly recruited when the need arose.

The Halliwell Manuscript, also called Regius Poem, is the oldest known document of masonic origin. It was published in 1840 by Shakespearean scholar and collector James Halliwell who dated it to 1390. A. F. A. Woodford, the pioneering Masonic scholar and a founder of Quatuor Coronati Lodge, agreed with this dating. More recently, historian Andrew Prescott has dated the text to the second quarter of the fifteenth century.

Labourers Act 1425
- Act of Parliament
- Parliament of England
- Long title: Masons shall not confederate themselves in chapiters and assemblies.
- Citation: 3 Hen. 6. c. 1
- Territorial extent: England and Wales; Ireland

Dates
- Royal assent: 14 July 1425
- Commencement: 30 April 1425 (Note: Start of session.)
- Repealed: 6 July 1825

Other legislation
- Amended by: Combination of Workmen Act 1824
- Repealed by: Combinations of Workmen Act 1825
- Relates to: Statute of Labourers 1351; Statute of Victuallers and Hostellers 1389

Status: Repealed

Text of statute as originally enacted

The poem may be seen as a response to a stream of legislation dating back to the Black Death, and the Statute of Labourers 1351 (25 Edw. 3. Stat. 2), in which Edward III attempted to fix wages at pre-plague levels. The earlier date follows the Statute of Victuallers and Hostellers 1389 (13 Ric. 2. Stat. 1. c. 8) of Richard II requiring the guilds and fellowships to lay before him their charters and letters patent. In 1425, during the third Parliament of Henry VI, the Labourers Act 1425 (3 Hen. 6. c. 1) banned the annual assemblies of masons.

In 1356, the preamble to regulations governing the Trade of Masons specifically states that, unlike the other trades, no body existed for the regulation of masonry by masons. Finally, in 1376, four representatives of the "mystery" or trade are elected to the Common Council in London. This also seems to be the first use of the word "freemason" in English. It was immediately struck out, and replaced with the word "mason".

The poem claims that these assemblies were ordained by King Athelstan and that he also linked the wages of a mason to the cost of living.

The Cooke Manuscript, dating from about 1450, set the pattern for what Anderson called the "Gothic Constitutions", the older histories and regulations of the craft. After a brief blessing, these documents describe the seven Liberal Arts, assigning predominance to Geometry, which is equated with Masonry. They then proceed to a history of masonry/geometry, finishing with King Athelstan, or Edwin, his brother or son depending on source, assembling England's masons to give them their charges. The regulations or charges follow, usually with instructions as to the manner in which a new mason should swear to them.

Also around 1450, the will of a mason from Beverley gives a tantalising glimpse into the emergence of masonic regalia. An inventory of John Cadeby's possessions mentions several zonae (girdles). Two were silver mounted, and one of these had the letters B and I in the middle, indicating Boaz and Jachin, the twin pillars of Solomon's Temple. He also owned a writing table and six English books, making him comfortably well-off and literate.

The following century and a half produced few new manuscripts. The Dowland manuscript, whose original is now lost, and Grand Lodge No 1, for the first time locate Edwin's assembly of Masons at York. The Lansdowne, originally dated to this period, is now thought to date from the 17th century.

During this period, the Reformation occurred. It was at one time assumed that the church was the major employer of masons, and, with the Dissolution of the Monasteries, the lodges disappeared. It was also believed that the craft "guilds" were abolished in England in 1547. On the death of Henry VIII, Archbishop Cranmer sought to advance the reformation by the abolition of guilds and fellowships. In 1548, "The bill of conspiracies of victuallers and craftsmen" was passed, revoking their monopolies. In 1549 it was repealed, presumably because they were too useful to the government. The government continued to be a major employer of masons, who in London had moved from a fellowship to a corporation. While this was not chartered until 1666, the state used it in the sixteenth century to procure and indent masons for building projects. In addition, masons were increasingly employed by private individuals. The Saints day parades by the various crafts, enacting plays about their various patron saints, were however suppressed. Robert Cooper, the archivist of the Grand Lodge of Scotland, believes that the lost mystery play of the masons may survive in the ritual of contemporary masonic lodges.

== Freemasonry in Scotland ==
An early continental history quotes a 16th-century source that, by 1535, there were two Scottish masonic lodges recorded in France, one in Paris and the other in Lyon.

In Scotland, the lodges of masons were brought under the control of two crown-appointed officials, the Warden General and the Principal Master of Work to the Crown, the latter being in existence from 1539 at the latest. Towards the end of the century, William Schaw held both these posts. In 1598, in conference with the masters of lodges in south east Scotland, he produced a set of regulations for the governance of masons and their lodges now known as the Schaw Statutes. These state "They shall be true to one another and live charitably together as becometh sworn brethren and companions of the Craft." They mention wardens, deacons, entered prentices and cowans. The second Schaw statutes, a year later, included in their negotiations a representative of the Lodge of Kilwinning (now Lodge Mother Kilwinning No 0) in Ayrshire, which was assigned jurisdiction over the west of Scotland. Edinburgh became the "first and principal" lodge and Kilwinning the "second and head" lodge of Scotland, attempting to appease all parties. Since neither the King nor the master of Kilwinning was present, the document was not regarded as final or binding. It was assumed that the King's warrant for the regulations would be obtained. In 1602, Schaw wrote a Charter granting to Sir William St Clair of Rosslyn the right to purchase patronage over the masons of Scotland. Kilwinning is noticeably absent from the list of lodges appending their endorsement. The charter seems to have lapsed when St Clair fled following a scandal, and a second charter was granted to his son, also William St Clair, in 1628. This patronage was surrendered by their descendant, another William St Clair, on the formation of the Grand Lodge of Scotland in 1736, in spite of the fact that it never won the royal approval that would have made it valid.

=== Emergence of speculative masonry ===
The lasting effect of the Schaw Statutes arose from the 1599 directive that the lodges should employ a reputable notary as secretary, and that he should record all important transactions. The Scottish lodges began to keep minutes, and therefore the appearance of "accepted" (non-operative) masons is better recorded than in England, where there are no known internal records of lodge proceedings.

The first recorded admission of non-masons was on 3 July 1634 at Lodge of Edinburgh (Mary's Chapel) No. 1, in the persons of Sir Anthony Alexander, his elder brother, Lord Alexander, and Sir Alexander Strachan of Thornton. Sir Anthony was the King's Principal Master of Work, and the man who had effectively blocked the second St Clair charter, the lodges of Scotland being his own responsibility. The reasons that his brother and their friend were also admitted are unclear.

The reasons and mechanisms for the transition of masonic lodges from operative communities to speculative fellowships remain elusive. As the responsibility for design shifted from the Master Mason to the architect in the sixteenth century, it is probable that architects started to join the lodges of the masons they worked with. It is also possible that, along with other professional bodies (including the East India Company), operative masonic lodges began to raise money by charging the gentry for admission to their "mysteries". Another opinion states that masonic lodges deliberately recruited the rich and powerful in an attempt to improve their pay and working conditions.

== England versus Scotland membership ==
On 20 May 1641, Sir Robert Moray was initiated into Freemasonry by several Freemasons who were members of the Lodge of Edinburgh. Although he was initiated into a Scottish lodge, the event took place south of the border: this is earliest extant record of a man being initiated into speculative Freemasonry on English soil.

While lodge records show a gradual development of mixed lodges in Scotland, it is evident that the lodge which initiated Elias Ashmole at Warrington on 16 October 1646 was mainly or entirely composed of speculative or accepted masons. In 1686, Robert Plot's "Natural History of Staffordshire" contains a passage about persons of quality being admitted to the society of free-masons, whose history Plot finds invented and ridiculous. At the start of the Grand Lodge period, there appears to have been a predominance of purely speculative lodges in the south of England, with operative and mixed lodges still in the majority in the north and in Scotland.

In 1716, four lodges and "some old Brothers" met at the Apple Tree Tavern in Covent Garden and agreed to meet again the next year to form a "Grand Lodge." These were the Goose and Gridiron, the Crown, the Apple Tree, and the Rummer and Grapes. The "old Brothers" were probably from the Cheshire Cheese and at least one other lodge.

== Early Grand Lodge period ==
=== First Grand Lodge ===
The early history of Grand Lodge is uncertain, since no minutes were taken until 1723. It is known that the four lodges mentioned above held an assembly at the Goose and Gridiron, in St Paul's Churchyard, on, 24 June 1717 (the Feast of St John the Baptist). They agreed to restore their "Quarterly Communications," four meetings a year for the transaction of masonic business, and an annual assembly to elect the next Grand Master. At this meeting, they elected Anthony Sayer, Master of the lodge at the Apple Tree, of whom little else is known, and the Grand Lodge of London and Westminster was born. At this stage, it is unlikely that they saw themselves as anything more than an association of London lodges. This perception was to change very rapidly.

The next year, George Payne became Grand Master. He was a career civil servant with the commissioners of taxes. In 1719, they elected John Theophilus Desaguliers, a clergyman, an eminent scientist, and a Fellow of the Royal Society. The last commoner to serve as Grand Master was George Payne in his second term of office in 1720/21, when he wrote The General Regulations of a Free Mason [sic] which were later incorporated in Anderson's Constitutions. Thereafter, in what appears to be a deliberate attempt to raise the profile of the organisation, all the Grand Masters have been members of the nobility.

Desaguliers is often described as the "father" of modern freemasonry. It was Desaguliers who inscribed the dedication to Anderson's Constitutions, headed the committee which directed and approved them, and supplied the "Gothic Constitutions" from which they were formed. Although he only served one term as Grand Master, he was twice Deputy Grand Master under figurehead Grand Masters, and at other times behaved as if he was Grand Master, forming irregular lodges to conduct initiations. It seems to have been Desaguliers who insisted that ritual be remembered rather than written down, leading to a dearth of material on the development of English ritual until after the formation of United Grand Lodge.

These considerations cause many masonic historians to see him as the guiding intelligence as the new Grand Lodge embarked on an era of self-publicity, which saw the sudden expansion of speculative masonry, with a corresponding rise in anti-masonic groups and publications. Initiations began to be reported in newspapers. The noble grand masters were often fellows of the Royal Society, but the Duke of Wharton (1722–23) had just had his Hell-fire club shut down by the government, and joined, or possibly formed, an anti-masonic group called the Gormagons almost as soon as he left office. From 1721 the installation of the new Grand Master was the occasion for a parade, originally on foot, later in carriages. This became the subject of some ridicule, until starting in 1740 there were also mock processions by anti-masonic groups, leading to the discontinuation of the practice in 1747. The rapid expansion of freemasonry also led to many new lodges failing after only a year or two. In addition to attacks from outside the craft, there were now disillusioned ex-masons willing to make money out of "exposures" of freemasonry.

=== Anderson's Constitutions ===
The Constitutions of the Free-Masons, "For the Use of the Lodges" in London and Westminster, was published in 1723. It was edited by the presbyterian clergyman, James Anderson, to the order of John Theophilus Desaguliers, and approved by a Grand Lodge committee under his control. This work was reprinted in Philadelphia in 1734 by Benjamin Franklin, who was that year elected Grand Master of Masons in Pennsylvania. It was also translated into Dutch (1736), German (1741), and French (1745).

Anderson was minister of the Presbyterian church in Swallow Street, London, which had once been Huguenot church, and one of its four Deacons was Desaguliers' father. At the time of his meeting with Desaguliers, he seems to have passed himself off as a Talmudic scholar. His reward for his labours was the copyright on the work. In time, and to Anderson's dismay, it was condensed into "pocket" editions over which he had no control and from which he received no income. It was expanded, updated, and re-published in 1738.

The first part of the constitutions consists of a history of Freemasonry. This is followed by the "Charges", general rules for the conduct of Freemasons, and Payne's Regulations, the specific rules by which Grand Lodge and the lodges under its control were to be governed. The ceremony for dedicating a new lodge was briefly outlined, and the work finished with a section of songs. For the first time, the old hand-written charges and constitutions was replaced by an accessible, printed condensation of all there was to being a Freemason, omitting only the ritual. Although the historical section was attacked at the time, and ever since, as being a work of obvious fiction, the work remains a milestone in masonic history. The "Antient Charges" published in the current Book of Constitutions of the United Grand Lodge of England have altered little from those originally published by Anderson.

=== Degrees and rituals of Freemasonry ===
In common with other trades or mysteries, medieval masonry recognised three grades of craftsman;— the apprentice, the journeyman, and the master. An apprentice who had learned his craft became a journeyman, qualified to do all manner of masonic work. The master was also qualified as a project manager, often functioning as architect as well. He would sketch the day's work on a tracing board for execution by the journeymen and apprentices. The Schaw Statutes of 1598 show how this had evolved in the lodge system of Scottish masonry. An apprentice, after serving his term of seven years, could elect to pay to join a lodge, becoming an "entered apprentice". (Alternatively, he could elect to freelance on the lower grades of building work as a "Cowan".) The journeymen were referred to as "fellows" or "fellows of the craft", which accords with the Regius poem's injunction (line 51) that masons should "calle other felows by cuthe". The members of the lodge were "Brithers" (brothers), a Scottish legal term for those bound to each other by oath. The Master was simply the mason in charge of the lodge, or one who had held that distinction.

While the swearing of some sort of oath goes back to the earliest records of organised masonry, the first recorded ritual is not until 1696, in the Edinburgh Register House manuscript. From this, and from other documents of the same period, such as the Trinity College, Dublin manuscript of 1711, we can form an idea of the ritual of an operative lodge at the end of the 17th century. On taking of the oath of an Entered Apprentice a mason was entrusted with appropriate signs, a "Mason's Word", and a catechism. This was accompanied by much horseplay, which was probably excised as the craft became more gentrified. The fellowcraft was made to take a further oath, and entrusted with two further words and the "five points of fellowship", which in 1696 were foot to foot, knee to knee, heart to heart, hand to hand, and ear to ear. The distinction between a fellowcraft and a master is unclear, and in many documents they appear to be synonymous. As accepted masons became initiated, where the various words and signs could no longer be regarded as professional qualifications, the entered apprentice ritual and the fellowcraft/master were sometimes condensed into one ceremony.

In Pritchard's Masonry Dissected, an exposure of masonic ritual written in 1730 by a disillusioned ex-mason, we see for the first time something recognisable as the three degrees of modern Freemasonry. On being admitted to a lodge, a new mason naturally progresses through the degrees of Entered Apprentice, Fellowcraft, and Master Mason. There still remains the rank of Installed Master, which comprises the Master in charge of the lodge and its past masters, and involves its own ritual, words and signs, but entails being elected to take charge of the lodge for a year. These are the regular degrees and ranks of "craft" masonry, common to all constitutions. Other, "higher" degrees are optional and require a mason to join a side-order, except in lodges constituted under the Grand Lodge of Scotland, which are empowered to confer the Mark Master Mason degree on Master Masons, as an extension to the second or Fellowcraft degree. (see main article, Freemasonry)

Anderson's 1723 constitutions seem to recognise only the grades of Entered Apprentice, and the Fellowcraft/Master. Hence the third degree emerged sometime between 1723 and 1730, and took some time to spread within the craft. The fact that it did spread seems to many scholars to indicate that the tri-gradal system was not so much innovation, as the re-organisation of pre-existing material. The Mason word, once given to the Entered Apprentice, was now conferred in the third degree with the five points of fellowship, and the two linked words formerly bestowed on a fellowcraft were split between the first two degrees. The new Master Mason degree was centred on the myth of Hiram Abiff, which itself consists of three parts. The first is the biblical story of the Tyrian artisan with a Northern Israelite mother who became a master craftsman involved in the construction of King Solomon's Temple. The second is the story of his murder by subordinates, which is similar to one of the legends of the French Compagnonnage. Lastly, the story of the finding of his body, and the derivation therefrom of the five points of fellowship, which appears in the Graham Manuscript of 1725, where the body being sought and exhumed is that of Noah. The origin of this re-organisation is unknown. The earliest reference to the conferment of a third degree is from London, from the minutes of "Philo Musicae et Architecturae Societas Apollini", a short-lived musical society composed entirely of Freemasons. These minutes record the initiation and passing to the degree of Fellowcraft of Charles Cotton. Then, on 12 May 1725, the society took it upon itself to "pass" Brother Cotton and Brother Papillion Ball as Master Masons. This would nowadays be regarded as highly irregular. In March 1726 Gabriel Porterfield received the same degree in lodge Dumbarton Kilwinning in Scotland. That he was not the first is attested by the minutes of the lodge's foundation, only two months earlier, where Apprentices, Fellowcrafts, and Master Masons are recorded as attending. In December 1728, Greenock Kilwinning recorded separate fees for initiation, passing and raising.

=== Spread of Grand Lodges (1725–1750) ===
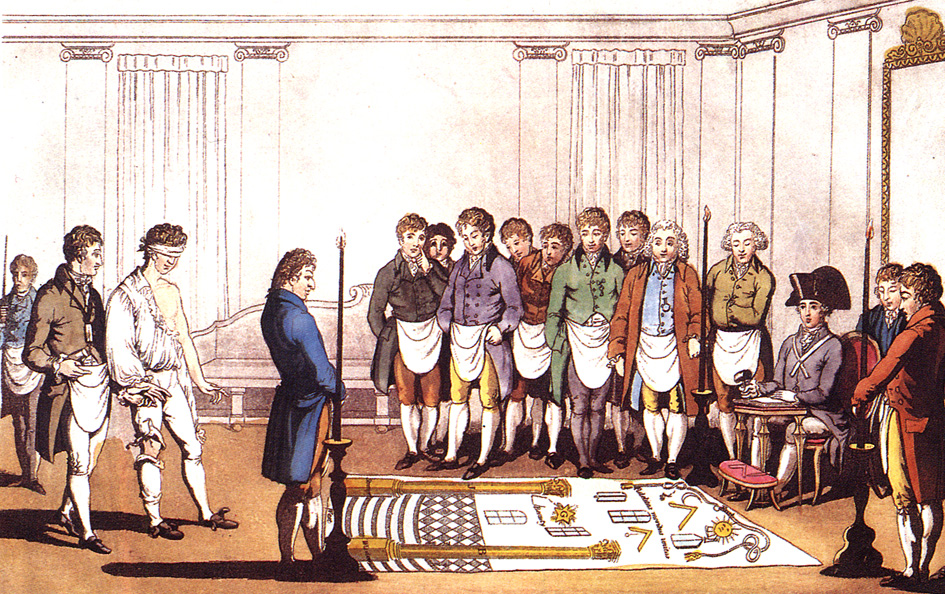
Initiation Paris 1745 Retinted to resemble Moderns Lodge 1805

Even in London, there were many lodges that never affiliated with the new Grand Lodge. These unaffiliated Masons and their Lodges were referred to as "Old Masons," or "St John Masons", and "St John Lodges". Nonetheless, the influence of the new central body spread quickly, and the 1725 minutes mention lodges in ten provincial towns as far north as Salford, with Provincial Grand Lodges in South Wales and Cheshire.

In the same year, a second Grand Lodge was founded in Ireland, which took several decades to bring all the Irish lodges under its wing. Rival Grand Lodges quickly appeared in Cork (The Grand Lodge of Munster). It was in Ireland that the practice of recognising the regularity of a lodge by the issue of a warrant began, the first known example dating from 1731. The Grand Lodge of Scotland was not formed until 1736.

Also in 1725 "The Ancient and Honourable Society and Fraternity of Freemasons meeting since time immemorial in the City of York" assumed the title, " The Grand Lodge of All England meeting in the City of York." This should not be interpreted as rivalry, as there was no overlap in the two jurisdictions. Indeed, Anderson's history would have produced the expectation of an older Grand Lodge at York, and the London Lodges were duly furnished with minutes going back some twenty years. Anderson's 1738 Constitutions recognised the independence of "the Old Lodge of York City. and the Lodges of Scotland, Ireland. France, Italy, etc".

The first documented notice in North America about freemasonry was published in the The Pennsylvania Gazette on 9 December 1730. It was published in an article by Benjamin Franklin.

However, in 1735, the Master and Wardens of an Irish lodge were refused admission to Grand Lodge because they did not have the written authority of the Grand Master of Ireland. It seems that they hoped to be recognised as a deputation from Lord Kingston, then Grand Master of Ireland, and Past Grand Master of the London Grand Lodge. They were offered, and refused, the English authorisation. This has been interpreted as evidence of a split between the two constitutions.

Responding to the popularity of Pritchard's and other exposures of masonic ritual, Grand Lodge, about this time, made changes to ritual and passwords to make it more difficult for outsiders to pass themselves off as masons. These changes were not universally accepted by affiliated lodges. The Goose and Gridiron (now Lodge of Antiquity No. 2), one of the original and most senior lodges of the constitution, never adopted them. For the unaffiliated, the innovations simply deepened the division. At the time, London was absorbing many economic migrants from Ireland. Those who were already Freemasons felt that they could not work with the new ritual, and the lodges they formed swelled further the numbers of unaffiliated lodges in the capital.

In the same period, Freemasonry as practiced by the English, Irish and Scottish lodges began to spread to Europe. The establishment of the first Grand Lodge in France is particularly problematic. Freemasonry itself appears to have been established in France by exiled Jacobites. The Grand Lodge of France dates its foundation to 1728, when it claims the Grand Master was the Duke of Wharton. Some Grand Orient seals date the first Grand Lodge to 1736 (the split between the Grand Lodge and the Grand Orient occurred in 1773). French histories date the first Grand Lodge to 24 June 1738. The situation seems confused, as other histories state that the first legitimate Grand Lodge was formed on 11 December 1743 as "The English Grand Lodge of France" with the Count of Clermont as grand master. Although the government of the craft was in the hands of a series of deputies, the protection of the count until his death in 1771 afforded French masonry a period of stability and growth. As masonry was persecuted in other catholic states, the moral and egalitarian nature of the French lodges accorded with the spirit of the age.

Although Anderson seems to imply the existence of an Italian Grand Lodge, no such body existed until the creation of the Grand Orient of Italy in 1805. The first lodge was the English Lodge ("La Loggia degli Inglesi") in Florence, founded in 1731, and Freemasonry quickly spread, in spite of a series of Papal bans.

The first appearance of the many German Grand Lodges dates from the 1740s, notably "Of the Three Globes", founded in Berlin in 1744, which became the "Grand National Mother Lodge" in 1772. Frederick the Great became a Freemason while he was still Crown Prince and personally sanctioned the Berlin Lodge. Although a few authors cite the existence of German operative grand lodges as far back as that formed at Cologne Cathedral in 1250, continuity of tradition has been hard to prove, and most sources believe the Eighteenth-century German speculative lodges show descent from the English model.

Freemasonry was brought to the Russian Empire by foreign officers in the Russian service. For instance, James Keith is recorded as being master of a lodge in Saint Petersburg in 1732–34. Several years later his cousin John Keith, 3rd Earl of Kintore was appointed Provincial Grand Master of Russia by the Grand Lodge of England. In the early 1770s, Ivan Yelagin succeeded in reorganizing Russian Freemasonry into a far-reaching system that united some 14 lodges and about 400 government officials. He secured English authorization of the first Russian Grand Lodge and became its Provincial Grand Master. Most Russian lodges were attracted to the Swedish Rite. In 1782, Ivan Schwarz represented Russia at the masonic congress in Wilhelmsbad (a health resort in Hanau), where Russia was recognized as the 8th province of the Rite of Strict Observance. See History of Freemasonry in Russia for further details.

=== Rival Grand Lodges ===
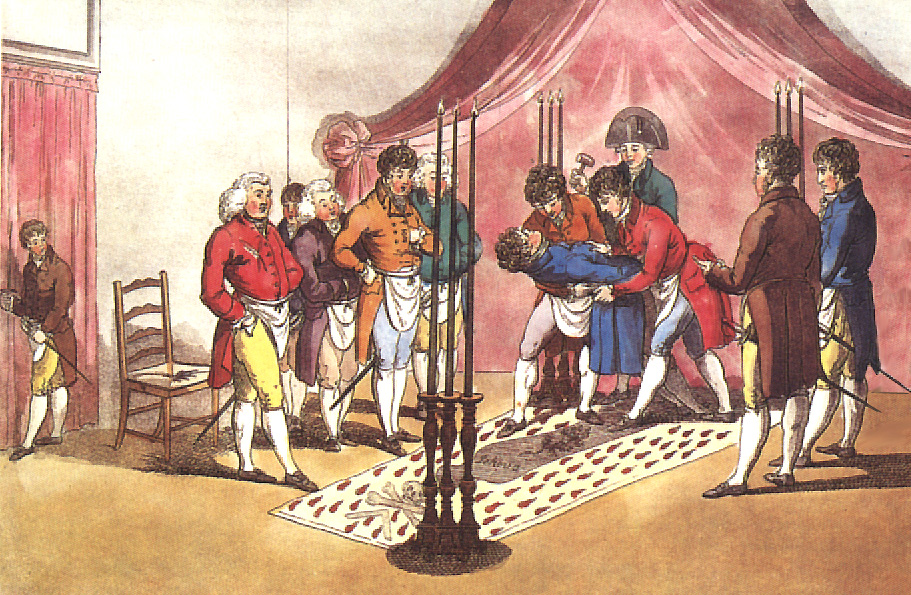
Third degree ceremony, Paris, 1745, retinted in 1812 to resemble a Moderns Lodge in London

On 17 July 1751, representatives of six Lodges gathered at the Turk's Head Tavern, in Greek Street, Soho, London. Five were unaffiliated lodges of mainly Irish membership, and the sixth appears to have been formed shortly beforehand for the business of the evening. On that night, they established the "Most Ancient and Honourable Society of Free and Accepted Masons according to the Old Constitutions", now commonly known as the Grand Lodge of the Antients. The first Grand Secretary, John Morgan, obtained a position in the Navy, and resigned after seven months. His successor, Laurence Dermott, presided as Grand Secretary for almost twenty years, being deputy Grand Master on three occasions after that, and exercised considerable influence until his death in 1791.

Dermott's immediate impact was in replacing the regulations that Morgan had written with those of his own lodge in Dublin. In 1756 he published the Antient's own book of constitutions, entitled the "Ahiman Rezon", for which no meaning is known. Modelled on Spratt's Irish Constitutions, the regulations are comprehensive and well written, and are followed by an extended section devoted to songs. At the beginning, instead of Anderson's history, is an extended introduction attacking the original Grand Lodge, now calling itself the Grand Lodge of England, but saddled by Dermott with "the Moderns" in contrast to the "Ancient" usages of the new Grand Lodge. This name remains in use to the present day. His main weapon was satire. He started with an account of how he attempted to write a history which would better the others by describing masonry before Adam, but towards the end of the first volume, he fell asleep. He dreamed of a conversation with Ahimon, one of four sojourners from Jerusalem, about the futility of masonic histories, after which an ancient in a shining breastplate perused his first volume and pronounced, "Thou hast div'd deep into the water, and hast brought up a potsherd". He was woken by his neighbour's puppy eating his manuscript. Dermott then proceeded to a reasoned explanation of why a new Mason should not join a "Moderns" lodge, since their amended passwords would not be recognised by any of the other Grand Lodges which at that time existed. There follows a humorous account of their "unconstitutional fopperies", including Dermott's belief that their greatest masonic symbols were the knife and fork.

Under Dermott's influence, penmanship, and oratory, the new Grand Lodge grew to be a serious challenge to the original. The Antient's lodges were warranted from 1752, a practice not taken up by the Moderns for another two decades. As the unaffiliated lodges increasingly saw the sense of belonging to a larger organisation, they usually found that the Antients practice was closer to their own, although it was known for lodges to change allegiance from the Antients to the Moderns. The fact that the practices eventually adopted by the United Grand Lodge largely reflect those of the Antients is attributable to Dermott's industry.

While the emergence of the Antients simply consolidated a division in English Freemasonry, a schism occurred within the Moderns in 1777/78. While this only involved one lodge, it was the oldest and most prestigious in the constitution, and its Master the Moderns' most respected author and historian. William Preston was already in dispute with the Grand Secretary over the royalties to the new Book of Constitutions he had just written. Some members of his Lodge of Antiquity (formerly the Goose and Gridiron, or the Old Lodge of St Paul's), having attended church as masons, walked back to the lodge in their regalia. Three brethren saw fit to report this to the Moderns Grand Lodge as an unauthorised masonic parade. Preston, the Master of Antiquity, sided with the accused, arguing that since the lodge was one of the original four, it had only subscribed to the original constitutions, and did not require any other authority to hold a parade. For this, he was promptly expelled. Antiquity responded by expelling the three who had complained. At least half of the lodge seceded to the Grand Lodge of All England at York, quoting Article 39 of Payne's regulations, that the Landmarks of the order must be preserved in any new regulations of Grand Lodge (alluding to their own rights and privileges). Antiquity became, for the period of separation, "the Grand Lodge of All England South of the River Trent", warranting at least two lodges in its own right. The dispute was not resolved until May 1789, when Preston and his brethren were received back into the Moderns with much feasting and fanfare.

A similar situation arose in Scotland. Seniority was assigned according to the dating of lodge minutes, and due to a fire, Kilwinning records started at 1642, somewhat later than the Lodge of St Mary's Chapel in Edinburgh. Offended by being recognised as only the second lodge in the constitution, Lodge Mother Kilwinning withdrew from the Grand Lodge of Scotland in 1743, and did not rejoin until 1807. During this period, Kilwinning functioned as yet another Grand Lodge, chartering about 70 lodges in Scotland and abroad. While the two Grand Lodges ignored each other at an official level, there does not appear to have been any real animosity, with no bar on masons visiting lodges in the competing jurisdiction. One Kilwinning member became Grand Master of the Grand Lodge of Scotland. The Lodge at Melrose, claiming an antiquity at least as great as Kilwinning, simply ignored the Grand Lodge of Scotland, again chartering daughter lodges, with the Master being addressed as "Grand Master". They finally joined the national body on 25 February 1891 as The Lodge of Melrose St John No 1 bis.

In the wake of the French Revolution, the British Government became uneasy about possible revolutionary conspiracies. Amongst other repressive measures, Pitt's government proposed to introduce the Unlawful Societies Act in 1799, which declared that any body which administered a secret oath was illegal. Acting quickly, a delegation representing the Ancients, Moderns and the Grand Lodge of Scotland arranged a meeting with the Prime Minister. The delegation included the Duke of Atholl, Grand Master of the Ancients, and Past Grand Master Mason of the Grand Lodge of Scotland, and the Earl of Moira, Acting Grand Master of the Moderns (the Grand Master being the Prince of Wales). As a result of this meeting, Freemasons were specifically excluded from the act, although lodges were obliged to return a list of members to the local Clerk of the Peace, a practice which continued until 1967. It also demonstrated that the two rival Grand Lodges could act together.

=== Establishment of Freemasonry in North America ===
In 1682, Scot John Skene came to New Jersey, and was dedicated by the Grand Lodge of New Jersey as the first Freemason resident in America.

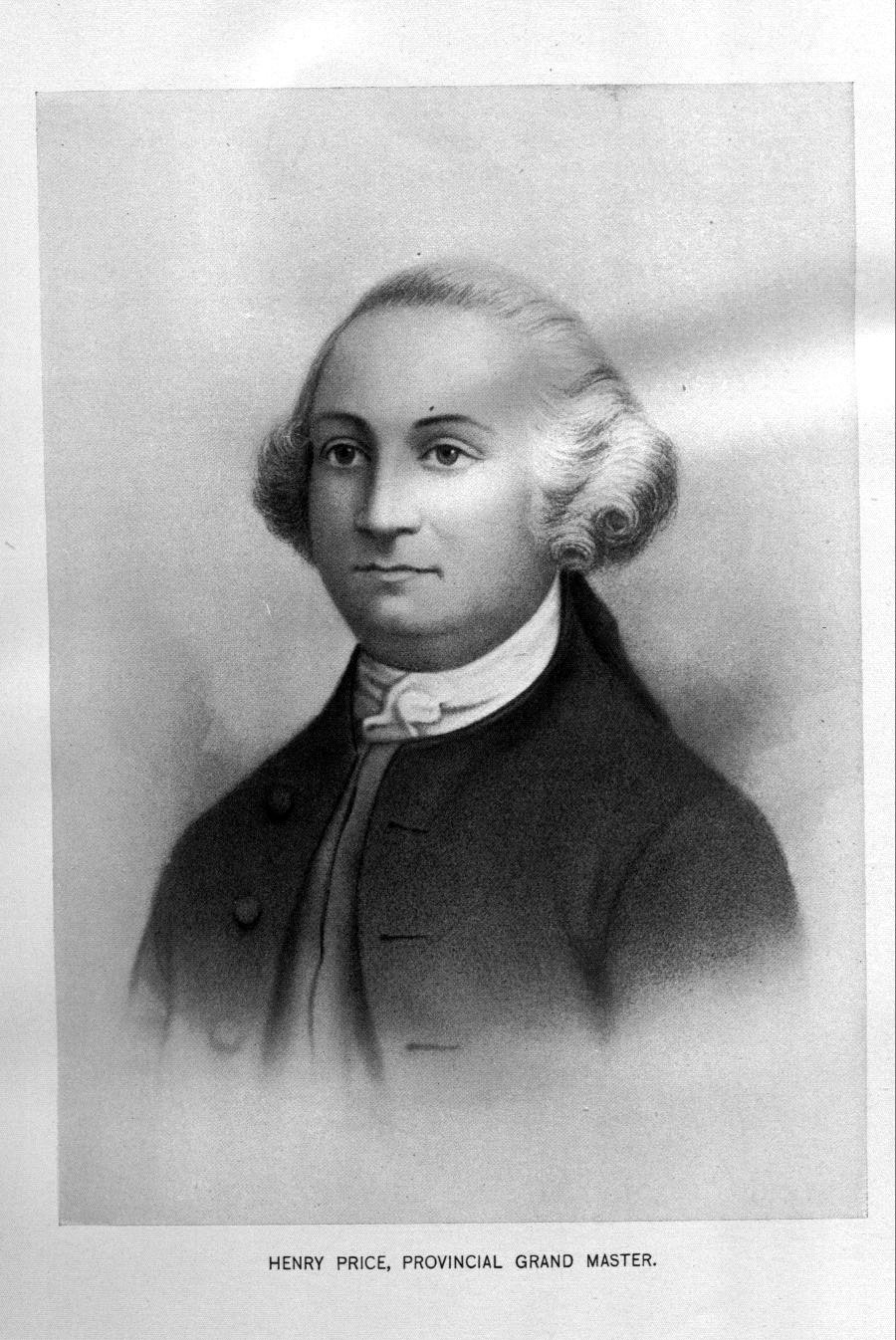
Henry Price, "Provincial Grand Master of New England and Dominions and Territories thereunto belonging"

In 1733, Henry Price, the Provincial Grand Master over all of North America for the Grand Lodge of England, granted a charter to a group of Boston Freemasons. This lodge was later named St. John's Lodge and was the first duly constituted lodge in America. Between 1733 and 1737 the Grand Lodge in England warranted Provincial Grand Lodges in Massachusetts, New York, Pennsylvania and South Carolina. Benjamin Franklin re-issued Anderson's 1723 constitutions as Provincial Grand Master of Pennsylvania. Franklin had written in the Pennsylvania Gazette of 8 December 1730 of the several lodges of freemasons already in the "province", joined St. John's Lodge in Philadelphia the following year, and in 1732 was Junior Grand Warden of the Grand Lodge of Philadelphia. All this before the "first" lodge in North America.

Correspondence from John Moore, the collector for the port of Philadelphia and himself a Mason, indicate that Masonic Lodges were meeting in Philadelphia in 1715. The present Grand Lodge has the Carmick manuscript, a handwritten copy of the ancient charges dating from 1727, and headed "The Constitutions of St. John's Lodge". Colonel Daniel Coxe was made Provincial Grand Master of New York, New Jersey and Pennsylvania by the Grand Lodge of England in 1730, with effect from 24 June (St. John the Baptist's day) for two years. It is unclear whether he was in America or England at the time, but he was present at Grand Lodge, at the Devil Tavern in London, on 29 January 1731, where he is minuted as Provincial Grand Master of North America. There is no record of his chartering any lodges, but he arranged for St. John's Lodge to double as a Provincial Grand Lodge, and appointed his successor in 1731, a year early. Notwithstanding the acceptance of Coxe as their first Provincial Grand Master, it has been suggested that the formation of the new Grand Lodge by consenting pre-existing lodges makes it a Grand Lodge by "Immemorial right", and a sister lodge to the Grand Lodges of England Scotland and Ireland.

North America would have many independent lodges in the 18th century. Authorisation, which later would become a Warrant, took time and expense, especially in the period when the nearest Grand Lodge was on the other side of the Atlantic. Many lodges became "self starters", and only applied for Grand Lodge authorisation when they were reasonably confident that the lodge would survive for more than a few years. George Washington was initiated into the Lodge of Fredericksburg in 1752. The same lodge was chartered by the Grand Lodge of Scotland in 1758. The first properly chartered "Scottish" lodge was only two years earlier, being the Lodge of St. Andrews in Boston. Members included Paul Revere and Joseph Warren, and (according to some) later lodge outings included the Boston Tea Party.

Many lodges were attached British Army regiments. The Moderns may have been wary of warranting lodges without a permanent address, so there was only one Grand Lodge of England warrant in the continental army from 1775 to 1777. The Antients and the Grand Lodge of Scotland were slightly better represented, but the overwhelming majority of regimental lodges held warrants from the Grand Lodge of Ireland. Thus it was that a group of African Americans, having been rejected by the lodges in Boston, were initiated into Lodge No 441 on the register of the Grand Lodge of Ireland, which was attached to the 38th Foot (later the 1st Staffordshire). These 15 men formed African Lodge No 1, as the British departed, leaving them a permit to do almost everything but admit new masons. Two of the members were seafarers, and obtained entrance to a lodge in London, being recognised as regularly initiated Masons. This enabled their master, Prince Hall, to apply to the Moderns for a charter, which was duly granted on 29 September 1784, now as African Lodge No. 459. Such was the success of the lodge that it became a Provincial Grand Lodge, and Prince Hall the Provincial Grand Master. After his death, the provincial lodges reconstituted themselves as a grand lodge (African Grand Lodge), becoming Prince Hall Grand Lodge in 1847. Around the same time, the history of Freemasonry in Mexico can be traced to at least 1806 when the first Masonic lodge was formally established in the nation.

== Royal Arch Freemasonry ==
The majority of this article deals with craft, or "blue lodge" masonry, the three degrees that are common to all masonic lodges and jurisdictions. Further degrees are usually outside of the jurisdiction of Grand Lodges, involve separate ceremonies, and are regulated by different Masonic bodies. The number and names of the "chivalric" orders and degrees depend on the local tradition of Freemasonry, and have varied greatly over the years. The oldest of these, and the most universal, is the Royal Arch Chapter (the Holy Royal Arch in England).

Although some masonic writers have attempted to see Royal Arch symbolism in material from the 1720s, the earliest definite reference is to a Royal Arch in a procession in Dublin preceding the master and held aloft by two "Excellent Masons". In 1744 it is mentioned as a degree in Dr Dassigny's "Serious and Impartial Inquiry".

Laurence Dermott, the guiding force behind the Ancients Grand Lodge, claimed to have been made a Royal Arch Mason in Dublin in 1746. He referred to it as the fourth degree, and campaigned to have it recognised as such. This happened just after he died, and only twenty years before the union of the Ancients and Moderns. The Moderns, on the other hand, had created a separate Grand Chapter in 1765 to deal with the degree, and wished to keep it separate from pure craft masonry. This would be a point of contention as the two jurisdictions moved towards union. The second of the articles of union stated that there were but three degrees in "pure Ancient Masonry", but included the Royal Arch in the third degree. The degree continues to be administered by a separate Grand Chapter, and until a revision in 2004, English Master Masons were simply told that the degree of the Holy Royal Arch completes their third degree.

The oldest Irish records of the ritual indicate that Royal Arch Chapters originally administered three degrees. The first was based on the refurbishment of the first temple by King Josiah. The second was a short bridge to the third, which was based on the rebuilding of the temple after the exile. Most jurisdictions base the modern Royal Arch ritual on the post-exilic legend. In 1864, the Grand Chapter of Ireland decided to base their ritual on the reign of Josiah, the main practical difference being the names of the officers.

== 19th century Freemasonry ==
=== Union of 1813 ===
In 1809, the Grand Lodge of England (the Moderns) set up a "Lodge of Promulgation". Its purpose was to "revert to the Ancient Land Marks of the Society" and to promulgate those landmarks amongst the brethren. One of its members was the Duke of Sussex, the Master of the Lodge of Antiquity, No 2, and sixth son of George III. The result of their labours was a reply to the Ancients in 1811 that the Grand Lodge had resolved to "return to the Ancient Landmarks...when it should be ascertained what those ancient landmarks and obligations were." Both Grand Lodges moved visibly towards union, forming committees to negotiate the precise terms. The main sticking point was the inability of the Ancients' committee to decide anything without reporting back to a quarterly meeting of their own Grand Lodge. In October 1812, the Ancients allayed the frustration of the Moderns by granting their commissioners full powers. Shortly after this, the Earl of Moira resigned as acting Grand Master of the Moderns, due to his appointment as Governor General of India. His successor was the Duke of Sussex, who became Grand Master the next January on the resignation of his brother, the Prince of Wales. On 1 December 1813, the Duke of Atholl ceded the leadership of the Ancients to the Duke of Kent, the older brother of Sussex and the father of Queen Victoria. Kent had already presided over the union of the Ancients and Moderns in Canada, accomplished by the brutally simple expedient of merging the lodges of the Moderns with the nearest lodge of the Ancients. The Moderns in Canada had simply ceased to exist. These two men oversaw the union in 1813 to form the United Grand Lodge of England, with the Duke of Sussex appointed as Grand Master of the new body.

The actual process of unification continued for some years, first with the Lodge of Reconciliation (1813–1816), made up of two lodges, one of each constitution, which ironed out some sort of ritual acceptable to the two parties. The work of this lodge was spread by the Stability Lodge of Instruction (1817) and fleshed out by the Emulation Lodge of Improvement (1823 onwards). The new Grand Lodge essentially ended up with the ritual of the Ancients and the infrastructure of the Moderns. While the "Emulation Ritual" became the standard, many variations still exist which, while mutually recognisable, present many flavours of Masonic ritual within the English Constitution.

=== Morgan affair and decline in American Freemasonry (1826–c.1850) ===
In 1826, William Morgan disappeared from Batavia, New York, after threatening to expose Freemasonry's secrets, causing some to claim that he had been murdered by Masons. What exactly occurred has never been conclusively proven. However, Morgan's disappearance – and the minimal punishment received by his kidnappers – sparked a series of protests against Freemasons throughout the United States, especially in New York and neighboring states. The protracted backlash led to many masons quitting.

Under the leadership of Thurlow Weed, an anti-Masonic and anti-Andrew Jackson (Jackson was a Mason) movement grew to become the Anti-Masonic Party and made the ballot for the presidency in 1828 while gaining the support of such notable politicians as William H. Seward. Its influence was such that other Jackson rivals, including John Quincy Adams, denounced the Masons. In 1847, Adams wrote a widely distributed book titled Letters on the Masonic Institution that was highly critical of the Masons. In 1832, the party fielded William Wirt as its presidential candidate. Wirt was secretly a Freemason, and even gave a speech at the Anti-Masonic convention defending the organization. The party only received seven electoral votes. Three years later, the party had disbanded in every state save Pennsylvania, as other issues such as slavery had become the focus of national attention.

=== American Freemasons during the Civil War ===
The fortunes of American Freemasonry declined sharply following the Morgan Affair, only to rebound as the force of the Anti-Masonic movement sputtered out in the mid-1830s. By the late 1850s, masonry in America was the subject of renewed popular interest and lodge membership, which had bottomed out during the anti-Masonic period began to rise. By the time of the American Civil War, U.S. freemasonry tripled its membership from 66,000 to 200,000 members in over 5000 lodges nationwide. This surge in membership helps explain, at least in part, the many stories of Masonic fraternisation during the American Civil War, which include accounts of Masonic soldiers and sailors rescuing enemy combatants who identified themselves as members of the fraternity. Masonic incidents are also recorded involving Freemasons burying their own with Masonic formalities during battle, as well as aid and special treatment given to Masonic POWs.

After the Civil War, American Freemasonry flourished along with other fraternal organizations during the so-called "Golden Age of Fraternalism" from approximately 1870 to 1920.

=== France ===
In France, the number of Freemasons grew from 10,000 in 1802, when Napoleon gave it semi-official status, to 20,000 in 1889, 32,000 in 1908, 40,000 in 1926, and about 60,000 in 1936. At an early stage, nearly all the lodges were affiliated with the Radical party. Zeldin argues that in 19th century France:

Freemasonry appealed first of all to people who liked mystic ritual, esoteric symbolism and fancy uniforms, and to those who like to have somewhere to discuss ideas and meet like-minded friends. Increasingly however it became an organization which politicians used for electoral purposes in which civil servants joined in order to further their chances of promotion, which hotel-keepers found useful as a way of enlarging their clientele and where businessmen could make deals and find jobs for their sons.

Rumors were rife, especially in conservative circles, that the order secretly ran the government, and was the main source of materialistic and anti-clerical propaganda. Zeldin concludes that was a "vast exaggeration." The details are known because the Vichy regime in 1941 seized the archives, and failed to find significant evidence. While the order did support anti-clerical campaigns, it did not initiate them. Its primary role was to serve as a social club which the members could rise in the world, and get 10% discounts in shops owned by fellow Masons. The chapters provided some charity and life insurance. In 1904 a scandal erupted because the Grand Orient de France lodges were asked by the Radical government to secretly collect information about the religious and political affiliations of army officers, with a view to blocking the promotion of Catholics. When the news leaked out, the government was forced to resign. The concern with Radical politics gradually declined, and it disappeared after 1945.

According to Ernest Belfort Bax, Freemasons were responsible for the last serious attempt at conciliation between Versailles and the Paris Commune on 21 April 1871. They were received coldly by Adolphe Thiers, who assured them that, though Paris was given over to destruction and slaughter, the law should be enforced, and he kept his word. A few days after they decided, in a public meeting, to plant their banner on the ramparts and throw in their lot with the Commune. On the 29th, accordingly, 10,000 of the brethren met (55 lodges being represented), and marched to the Hôtel de Ville, headed by the Grand Masters in full insignia and the banners of the lodges. Amongst them the new banner of Vincennes was conspicuous, bearing the inscription in red letters on a white ground, "Love one another." A balloon was then sent up, which let fall at intervals, outside Paris, a manifesto of the Freemasons. The procession then wended its way through the boulevards and the Champs Elysées to the Arc de Triomphe, where the banners were planted at various points along the ramparts. On seeing the white flag on the Porte Maillot the Versaillese ceased firing, and the commander, himself a Freemason, received a deputation of brethren, and suggested a final appeal to Versailles, which was agreed to. The "chief of the executive" hardly listened to the envoys, and declined to further discuss the question of peace with anyone. This last formal challenge having been made and rejected, the Freemasons definitely took their stand as combatants for the Commune.

=== Great Schism ===
The schism between French and English Freemasonry is popularly supposed to originate at a general assembly of the Grand Orient de France in September 1877. Accepting a recommendation in a report by a Protestant minister, Frédéric Desmons, the assembly, on a majority vote, amended its constitutions to read "Its principles are absolute liberty of conscience and human solidarity". The words "Its principles are the existence of God, the immortality of the soul and human solidarity" were struck out. The United Grand Lodge of England's (UGLE) response was a resolution in March 1878 that "the Grand Lodge, whilst always anxious to receive in the most fraternal spirit the Brethren of any Foreign Grand Lodge whose proceedings are conducted according to the Ancient Landmarks of the Order, of which a belief in T. G. A. O. T. U. (the Great Architect of the Universe) is the first and most important, cannot recognise as 'true and genuine' Brethren any who have been initiated in Lodges which either deny or ignore that belief". Relations between the two governing bodies effectively ceased, purportedly because the French body had removed the requirement for a belief in a supreme being. However, UGLE had just entered into fraternal relations with the Grand Orient of Belgium, which had removed the Great Architect from its constitutions in 1872, a relationship which lasted until 1921. The reasons for the split are obviously deeper and more complex than the official records suggest.

Mutual distrust between English and French Freemasons was apparent in the 1850s, when French Masonic refugees were appalled at the relationship between UGLE and the Monarchy, aristocracy, and the Anglican church. The English distrusted the mysticism of French Masonry, and its ideals of Fraternity and Universality.

Desmons' review had been prompted by the Lausanne Congress of Supreme Councils of 1875. Eleven countries were represented at an attempt to unify the Ancient and Accepted Scottish Rite. An agreement on colonial lodges would have seen the UGLE as the only recognised masonic grand lodge in British colonies, in spite of the Scottish and Irish lodges already flourishing there. The Scottish delegate, Mackersy, who also represented Greece, withdrew. His letter of withdrawal cited his jurisdiction's disagreement with any shift from the requirement for a member to believe in a personal god. He said that he believed the congress would agree to a non-requirement, or the specification of a vague universal principle. In avoiding ratifying a treaty which would obliterate Scottish lodges in the colonies, Mackersy sparked a debate that led to the removal of a requirement for an open volume of scripture in French lodges. The English interpretation of this as a slide towards atheism was probably partly prompted by the difficult political relationship between Britain and France at that time.

The gulf between UGLE and GOdF widened due to the French body's active engagement in politics, on a personal and organisational level. All discussion of politics and religion is expressly banned from English lodges.

==== Legacy of the Schism ====
During the First World War, many American lodges relaxed their opposition to the Grand Orient de France to allow servicemen to engage with other masons while in France. Many of these continue to allow their members to associate with continental Freemasons.

In December 1913, UGLE recognised a new Grand Lodge in France. The basis of this recognition was the series of obligations that the Independent and Regular National Grand Lodge of France (later the Grande Loge Nationale Française) imposed on its lodges. These were:

1. While the Lodge is at work the Bible will always be open on the altar.
2. The ceremonies will be conducted in strict conformity with the Ritual of the "Regime Rectifié" which is followed by these Lodges, a Ritual which was drawn up in 1778 and sanctioned in 1782, and with which the Duke of Kent was initiated in 1792.
3. The Lodge will always be opened and closed with invocation and in the name of the Great Architect of the Universe. All the summonses of the Order and of the Lodges will be printed with the symbols of the Great Architect of the Universe.
4. No religious or political discussion will be permitted in the Lodge.
5. The Lodge as such will never take part officially in any political affair but every individual Brother will preserve complete liberty of opinion and action.
6. Only those Brethren who are recognised as true Brethren by the Grand Lodge of England will be received in Lodge.

These "basic principles" were accepted by UGLE itself in 1929, and written into its constitutions.

=== Freemasonry in the Middle East ===
Freemasonry was introduced in Egypt as early as the 1790s during the French campaigns of Syria and Egypt. In Turkey, Freemasonry was popular amongst the Levantine merchants during the same era. After the failure of the 1830 Italian revolution, a number of Italian Freemasons were forced to flee. They secretly set up an approved chapter of Scottish Rite in Alexandria, a town already inhabited by a large Italian community. Meanwhile, the French Freemasons publicly organised a local chapter in Alexandria in 1845. During the 19th and 20th century Ottoman Empire, Masonic lodges operated widely across all parts of the empire and numerous Sufi orders shared a close relationship with them. Many Young Turks affiliated with the Bektashi order were members and patrons of freemasonry. They were also closely allied against European imperialism. Many Ottoman intellectuals believed that Sufism and Freemasonry shared close similarities in doctrines, spiritual outlook and mysticism.

One of major Arab Muslim scholarly figures notable for promoting the cause of Freemasonry was the Algerian 'Abd al-Qadir al-Jaza'iri who admitted his three sons into Masonry. He spoke highly of Masons and their universalist efforts. In his visit to Alexandria in June 1864, the Freemasons of Alexandria welcomed 'Abd al-Qadir's arrival. The Lodge of Pyramids specifically convened a ceremony in the 18th of June, to mark his arrival. In addition to being a distinguished religious scholar, 'Abd al-Qadir had committed himself to promote the ideals of a society established on Universal Brotherhood. 'Abd al Qadir was initiated into the Mysteries and honoured as the "Fellow of the Prophet", in addition to the previous privilege of being "a free and accepted Mason". After the occasion and a short stay in the city, 'Abd al-Qadir left for Syria by the end of July 1864; to take possession of a large property of land in Syria presented to him by the Viceroy of Egypt.

=== Taxil hoax ===
Between the years 1885 and 1897, Léo Taxil maintained a hoax against both Freemasonry and the Roman Catholic Church, by making increasingly outlandish claims regarding Freemasonry. On 19 April 1897, Taxil called a press conference at which he claimed he would introduce the "author" of his books to the press. He instead announced that his revelations about the Freemasons were fictitious. Nevertheless, the material is still used on some anti-Masonic websites.

== 20th century Freemasonry ==
=== Freemasonry under totalitarian regimes (1900–present) ===
Many twentieth century totalitarian regimes, both Fascist and Communist, have treated Freemasonry as a potential source of opposition due to its secret nature and international connections (not to mention its promotion of religious and political tolerance through its symbolism). It has been alleged by Masonic scholars that the language used by the totalitarian regimes is similar to that used by some modern critics of Freemasonry.

== See also ==
- Observant Freemasonry
- Masonic manuscripts
- List of Freemasons
- Masonic Appendant Bodies
- Scottish Rite
- Stonemason
- York Rite
- History of Masonic Grand Lodges in North America
- Brethren of the Rosy Cross

== Bibliography ==
- Berger, Joachim: European Freemasonries, 1850–1935: Networks and Transnational Movements, European History Online, Mainz: Institute of European History, 2010, retrieved: 14 June 2012.
- Bullock, Steven C. "Initiating the Enlightenment?: recent scholarship on European freemasonry", Eighteenth-Century Life (1996) 20#1 pp. 80–92 online, historiography
- Curl, James Stevens. The Art and Architecture of Freemasonry: An Introductory Study (Woodstock, N.Y.: Overlook, 1993)
- Daniel, James W. Masonic Networks and Connections (2007)
- Dickie, John. The Craft: How the Freemasons Made the Modern World (2020), major scholarly history by a British professor; world coverage to about year 2000. excerpt
- Dumenil, Lynn. Freemasonry and American Culture, 1880–1930 (1984) a major scholarly history. excerpt
- Hackett, David G. That Religion in Which All Men Agree: Freemasonry in American Culture (2015) a major scholarly history excerpt
- Harland-Jacobs, Jessica L. Builders of Empire: Freemasonry and British Imperialism, 1717–1927 (2009)
- Hoffman, Stefan-Ludwig. The Politics of Sociability: Freemasonry and German Civil Society, 1840–1918 (2008)
- Jacob, Margaret C. Living the Enlightenment: Freemasonry and Politics in Eighteenth-Century Europe (Oxford University Press, 1991)
- Mackey, Albert Gallatin. The History of Freemasonry, Vol. 6 (Masonic History Co., NY, 1898) pages 1485–1486 membership by state in United States 1898 online here
- MacNulty, W. Kirk. Freemasonry: Symbols, Secrets, Significance (2008)
- Mehigan, Tim; de Burgh, Helene. "'Aufklärung', freemasonry, the public sphere and the question of Enlightenment", Journal of European Studies, March 2008, Vol. 38 Issue 1, pp. 5–25. Plays down the role of Freemasonry in the Enlightenment
- Mirala, Petri. Freemasonry in Ulster, 1733–1813: A Social and Political History of the Masonic Brotherhood in the North of Ireland (2007)
- Ridley, Jasper. The Freemasons: A History of the World's Most Powerful Secret Society (2011) scholarly world history down to early 20th century. excerpt
- Stevenson. David. The Origins of Freemasonry: Scotland's Century, 1590–1710 (Cambridge University Press, 1990)
- Stevenson. David. The First Freemasons: Scotland's Early Lodges and Their Members (Aberdeen University Press, 1988)
- "REHMLAC+ : Revista de Estudios Históricos Latinoamaricana y Carabeña" (in Spanish and English). University of Costa Rica. ISSN 2215-6097. (semestral academic journal on the history of global Freemasonry, Creative Commons licensed; e-ISSN: 1659-4223)
