= Hawkesworth baronets =

Extinct baronetcy in the Baronetage of England

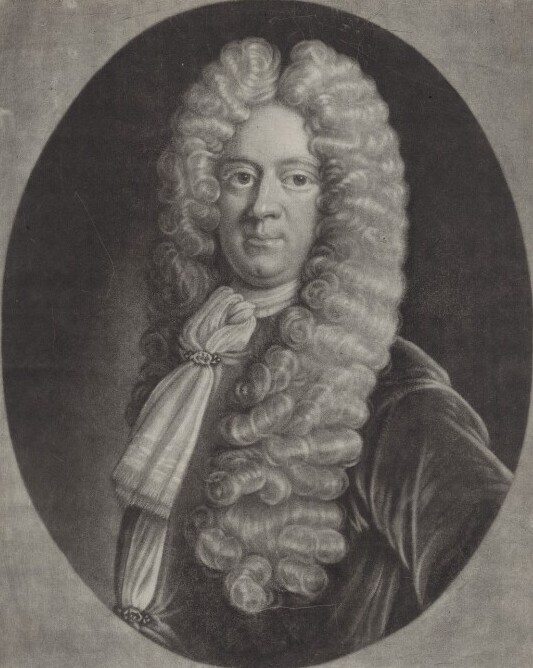
Engraving of Sir Walter Hawkesworth, 2nd Baronet

The Hawkesworth baronetcy (also Hawksworth and Hoxworth), of Hawksworth, near Guiseley in West Yorkshire, was a title in the Baronetage of England. It was created on 6 December 1678 for Walter Hawkesworth. The second Baronet was High Sheriff of Yorkshire in 1721, and was twice president of the old masonic lodge at York, later styled the Grand Lodge of All England. The title became extinct on his death in 1735.

== Hawkesworth baronets, of Hawkesworth (1678) ==
- Sir Walter Hawkesworth, 1st Baronet (1660–1683)
- Sir Walter Hawkesworth, 2nd Baronet (died 1735)
