= James Anderson (Freemason) =

Scottish writer and minister (1680–1739)

James Anderson (c. 1690/1691–1739) was a Scottish writer and minister born and educated in Aberdeen, Scotland. He was ordained a minister in the Church of Scotland in 1707 and moved to London, where he ministered to the Glass House Street congregation until 1710, to the Presbyterian church in Swallow Street until 1734, and at Lisle Street Chapel until his death. He is reported to have lost a large sum of money in the South Sea Company crash of 1720. Anderson is best known for his association with Freemasonry.

== Biography ==
James was born in Aberdeen in 1690/1 the son of John Anderson of Mudehouse, the elder brother of Adam Anderson, (1692–1765). He was educated at Marischal College from 1705 to 1709 and soon thereafter licensed to preach as a Church of Scotland minister by the Presbytery of Aberdeen.

In 1710 he was appointed minister of the Church of Scotland for the Scots population living in Westminster. He originally preached from a newly-built meeting hall at Glasshouse Street and then moved to the French Protestant Chapel in Swallow Street, London.

In 1734 he translated to a similar charge in Lisle Street, Leicester Square. According to the Gentleman's Magazine, he is said to have been "well known among the people of that persuasion resident in London as Bishop Anderson", and he is described as "a learned but imprudent man, who lost a considerable part of his property in the fatal year 1720". Several of his sermons were printed. One of them, No King-Killers, preached in 1715, on the anniversary of the execution of Charles I, was a zealous defence of the conduct of the Presbyterians during the civil wars, and reached a second edition. Anderson was a freemason, and when, in 1721, on the revival of freemasonry in England, the grand lodge determined to produce an authoritative digest of the Constitutions of the fraternity, the task was assigned to him (Entick's edition (1747) of the Constitutions, p. 194 et seq.). It was as a grand warden of the lodge that he presented to it, on completing his task, The Constitutions of the Free-Masons; containing the History, Charges, Regulations, &c. of that Most Ancient and Right Worshipful Fraternity. For the Use of the Lodges. London. In the year of Masonry 5723, Anno Domini 1723. This work, which passed through several editions, was long recognised by the English freemasons to be the standard code on its subject, and was translated into German. An American facsimile of the first edition of 1723 was issued at New York City in 1855, and there are reprints of the same edition in Cox's Old Constitutions belonging to the Freemasons of England and Ireland (1871) and in the first volume of Kenning's Masonic Archæological Library (1878). Anderson also contributed to masonic literature A Defence of Masonry, occasioned by a pamphlet called "Masonry Dissected" (1738?), which was translated into German, and is reprinted in Golden Remains of the Early Masonic Writers by George Oliver (1847).

He died in London on 28 May 1739.

== Freemasonry ==
Anderson was a Freemason, the Master of a Masonic lodge, and a Grand Warden of the Grand Lodge of London and Westminster (later known as the Premier Grand Lodge of England and in the 19th century as the United Grand Lodge of England). He was a member of the Royal Society, and a friend of Isaac Newton and John Theophilus Desaguliers. He was commissioned in September 1721 by the Grand Lodge to write a history of the Free-Masons, and it was published in 1723 as The Constitutions of the Free-Masons. Anderson's name does not appear on the title page, but his authorship is declared in an appendix.

Anderson's work, although of the first importance to the history of freemasonry, is unfortunately marred by a number of extravagant claims which are simply incredible. Indeed, it was shown at the tercentenary conference of the respected Quatuor Coronati research Lodge at Queens' College, Cambridge, that Anderson's history of the founding of the Grand Lodge is doubtful, since the public houses mentioned could probably not have accommodated the meetings that he claims were held in 1717. Anderson's account must be broadly accurate, having been widely published within six years of the events described, but it may have been backdated by two or three years, perhaps to aggrandise some brethren as Past Grand Officers.

== Works ==
The work by which Anderson is chiefly remembered appeared in 1732, Royal Genealogies; or, the Genealogical Tables of Emperors, Kings, and Princes, from Adam to these times. Professedly based on Genealogische Tabellen of Johann Hübner, it was largely supplemented by Anderson's industry. While the earlier sections of the work are of little historical value, the later are often of use in relation to the genealogies of continental dynasties and houses. The volume closes with a synopsis of the English peerage, and in the preface the author intimated his readiness, if adequately encouraged, "to delineate and dispose at full length the genealogies of all the peers and great gentry of the Britannic isles".

Anderson's last work, which he was commissioned to undertake by the first Earl of Egmont and his son from materials furnished by them, bore the title, A Genealogical History of the House of Yvery, in its different branches of Yvery, Lovel, Perceval, and Gournay; but the first volume alone was completed when Anderson died on 25 May 1739, and a second volume, subsequently published, was due to another pen (see "To the Reader" in vol. ii). The work was soon withdrawn from circulation on account of some disparaging remarks in it on the condition of the English peerage and on the character of the Irish people. It was re-issued, however, without the offensive passages, in 1742. Much of the genealogical matter in the book has been pronounced to be mythical. Another work of Anderson's, News from Elysium, or Dialogues of the Dead, between Leopold, Roman Emperor, and Louis XIV, King of France, was published shortly after his death in 1739.

The Constitutions was edited and reprinted by Benjamin Franklin in Philadelphia in 1734, becoming the first Masonic book printed in America. An electronic edition of that work is online. A second London edition, much expanded, appeared in 1738. The work was translated into many languages, including Dutch (1736), German (1741), and French (1745).

== See also ==
- Ahiman Rezon
