= Quatuor Coronati Lodge =

Masonic research lodge in London, England

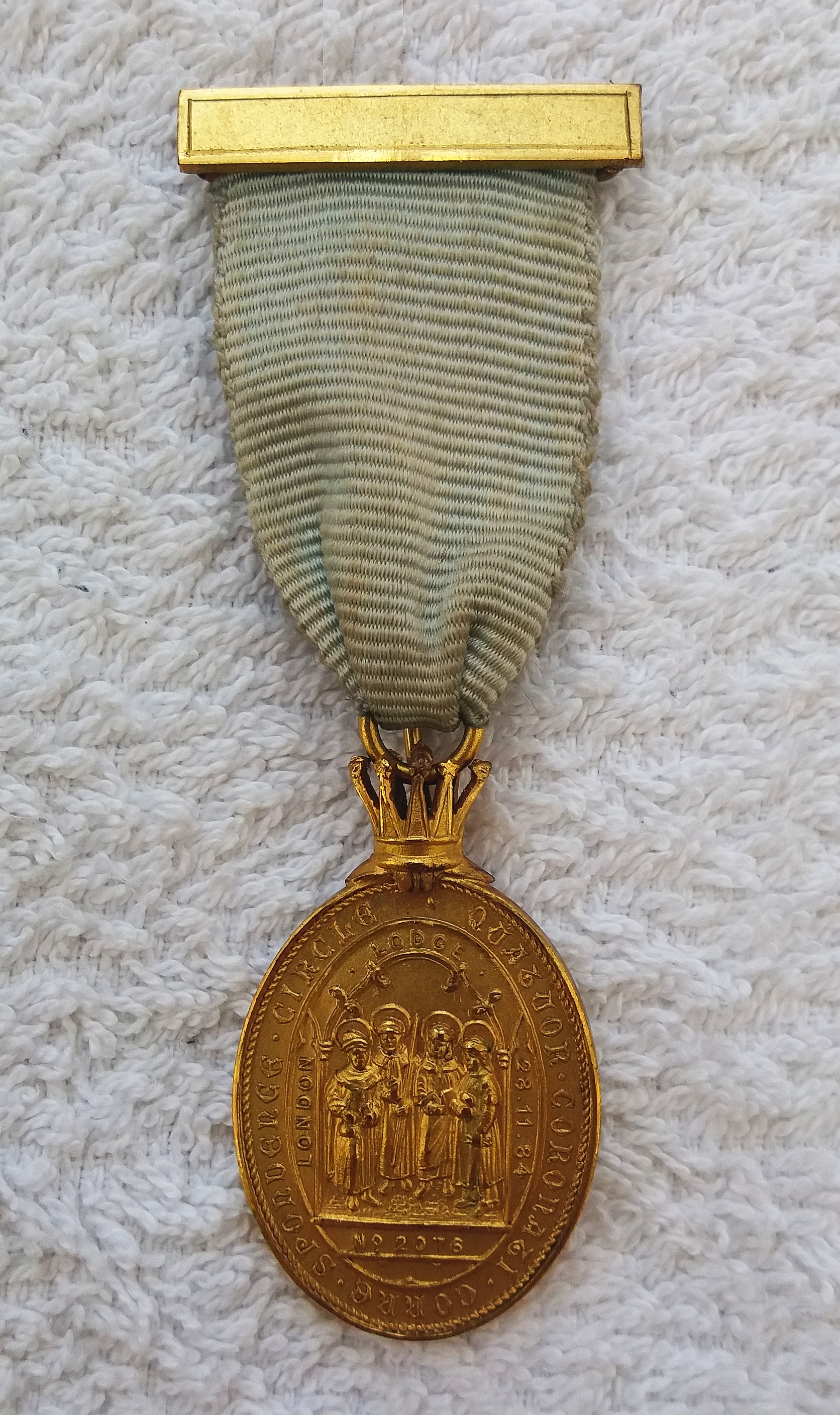
Quatuor Coronati jewel

Quatuor Coronati Lodge No. 2076 (its Latin title meaning Four Crowned Ones) is a Masonic Lodge in London dedicated to Masonic research. Founded in 1886, the Lodge meets at Freemasons' Hall, Great Queen Street.

The name of the Lodge is taken from lines 497 - 534 of the Regius Poem. This poem from circa 1390 is one of the oldest Masonic documents.

Nine Masons (Charles Warren, William Harry Rylands, Robert Freke Gould, The Revd Adolphus Frederick Alexander Woodford, Walter Besant, John Paul Rylands, Major Sisson Cooper Pratt, William James Hughan, and George William Speth), dissatisfied with the way the history of Freemasonry had been expounded in the past, founded the Lodge, obtaining a warrant in 1884. Due to the absence of the first Master, Sir Charles Warren, on a diplomatic mission in Southern Africa, the Lodge was not formally inaugurated until two years later. They insisted on using an evidence-based approach to the study of Masonic history. As such, their approach was new and unusual, and they intended that the results should "replace the imaginative writings of earlier authors on the history of Freemasonry." This began what is now called the "authentic school" of Masonic research.

In addition to quarterly meetings where papers are delivered and the presenters questioned, the Lodge publishes yearly transactions titled Ars Quatuor Coronatorum and maintains the Quatuor Coronati Correspondence Circle (QCCC) to allow participation from Masons all over the world.

== See also ==
- Research Lodge
