= Lodge of Edinburgh (Mary's Chapel) No. 1 =

Masonic lodge in Edinburgh, Scotland

Coordinates: 55.9535°N 3.2029°W

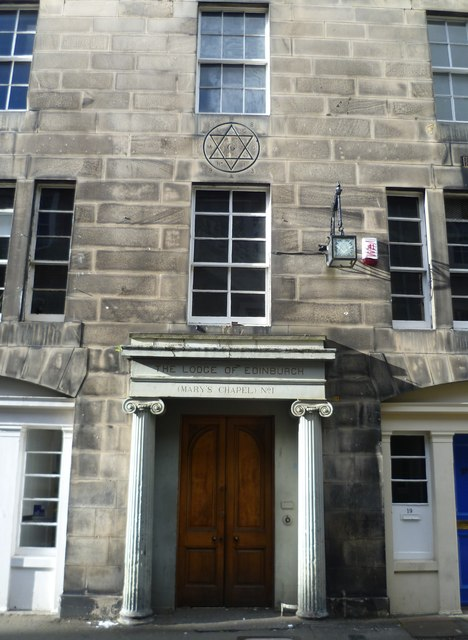
The Lodge of Edinburgh No.1 (Mary's Chapel), Hill Street

The Lodge of Edinburgh (Mary's Chapel), No.1, is a Masonic Lodge in Edinburgh, Scotland.

It is designated number 1 on the Roll (list) of lodges of the Grand Lodge of Scotland, and as it possesses the oldest existing minute of any masonic lodge still operating (31 July 1599) and the first historical reference of a non-operative or speculative freemason being initiated as a member (1634), it is reputed to be the oldest Masonic Lodge not only in Scotland, but the world.

It is often styled Mary's Chapel or The Ancient Lodge of Edinburgh Mary's Chapel, the former of which derives from its ancient origins, where it first met within the old chapel of St Mary's on Niddrie's Wynd in Edinburgh, which was demolished to make way for Edinburgh's South Bridge, which were completed in 1788.

The lodge meets at 19 Hill Street, in the New Town, in a building erected in the 1820s.

Designed by architect George Angus, it was built as a "Subscription Baths and Drawing Academy", and was purchased by the lodge in 1893. It is a category A listed building.

The building is used as an arts venue during the Edinburgh Festival Fringe each August, when it is known as the Hill Street Theatre. It is the longest-standing continuously operating Fringe venue, and was operated for over twenty years by Universal Arts, but is now operated by Edinburgh Little Theatre.
