= Adolphus Frederick Alexander Woodford =

Pioneering Masonic Researcher

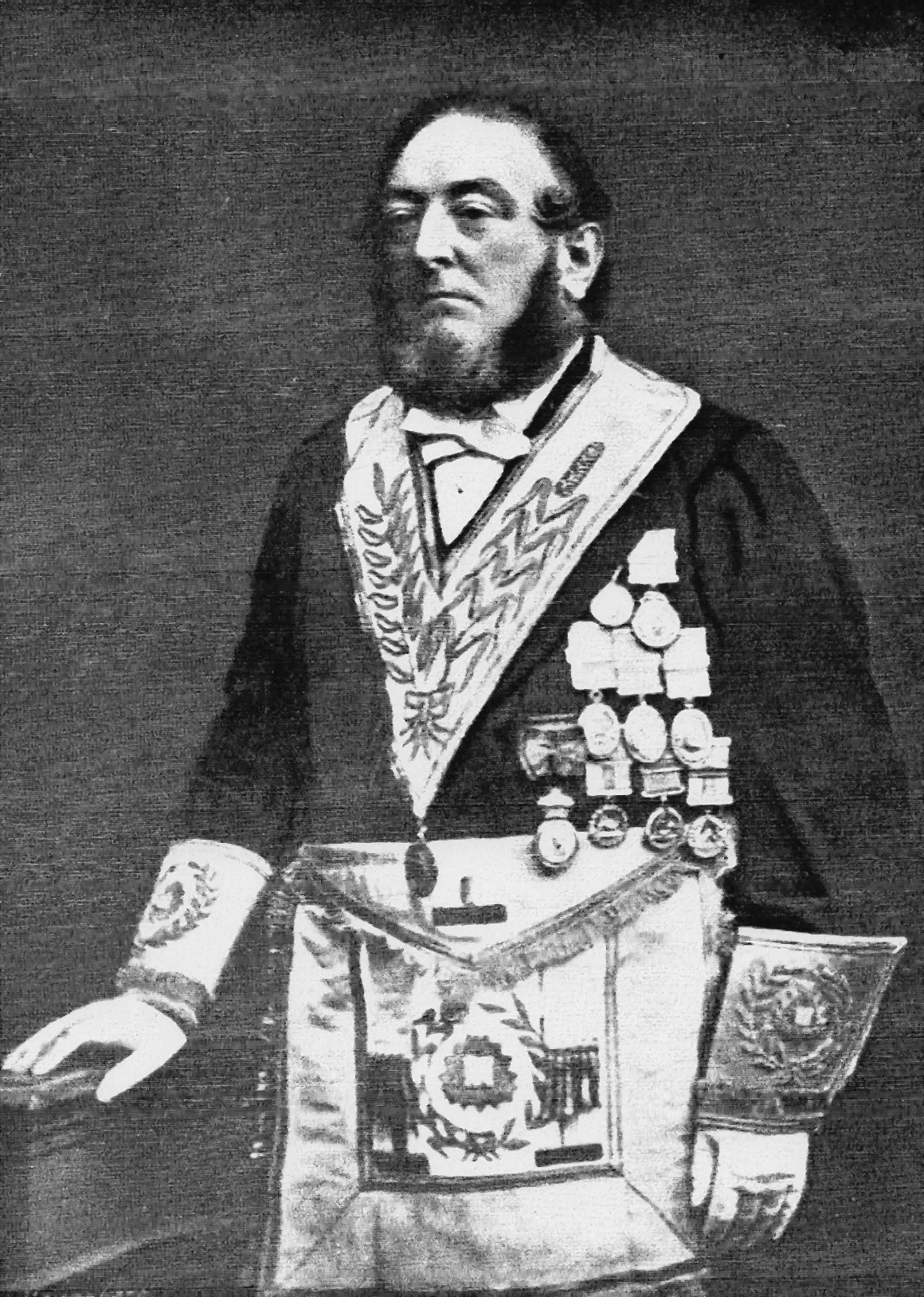
A. F. A. Woodford in the regalia of Grand Chaplain (UGLE)

Adolphus Frederick Alexander Woodford (1821–1887) was the eldest son of Alexander George Woodford, a career soldier who was already a hero of Waterloo, and would rise to Field Marshal, ending his days in command of Chelsea Hospital. After a short stay in the Coldstream Guards, Adolphus entered the Anglican Church, having the living of Swillington from 1847 to 1872. On leaving the Army, he also became a Freemason, rising to become Grand Chaplain in 1863, commuting from Yorkshire to his London duties.

After moving to London, his editorship of the Freemason ignited an interest in the study of Masonic history, and led to the establishment of Quatuor Coronati Lodge, dedicated to masonic research. Woodford was the first Immediate Past Master of the lodge, and as such convened the lodge for much of its first two years, during the frequent absences of Charles Warren, the master. Just before his death, towards the end of 1887, he passed on a set of coded papers which resulted in the establishment of the Hermetic Order of the Golden Dawn.

== Birth, Army and Vocation ==
Adolphus Woodford was born on 9 July 1821. His father was already a distinguished soldier, and as eldest son he was named after the Colonel-in-Chief of his father's regiment, the Coldstream Guards. It seems a natural progression for Adolphus to have become an officer in the same regiment. He was gazetted as a lieutenant on 25 December 1838, but resigned on 23 April 1841. His father was, by this time, Governor-general of Gibraltar, and it was there, on 9 February 1842, that Adolphus was initiated into his father's lodge, the Lodge of Friendship No 345 (now the Royal Lodge of Friendship No 278). He took the customary three degrees of Entered Apprentice, Fellowcraft and Master Mason, and is known to have attended nine meetings of the lodge in total, before returning to England in the autumn, matriculating at the University of Durham to study Theology.

He was awarded his Bachelor of Arts in 1846, and Licentiate of Theology in 1847. Meanwhile, he joined Marquis of Granby Lodge No 146 (now 124), and served two years as Master. His second year as master, 1847, also saw him appointed Provincial Grand Chaplain for the County of Durham. His academic achievements, while less than impressive, saw him ordained Priest that same year, and appointed Rector of St. Mary's Church, Swillington, where he would remain for the next twenty-five years.

== The Rector of Swillington ==
In 1847 Swillington, to the south-east of Leeds, was still a rural community, although mining was starting to assert itself as the driving force of the local economy. Woodford was still the Provincial Grand Chaplain in Durham, while completing structural work on his church in Yorkshire. It was not until 1854 that he joined Philanthropic Lodge No 382 (now 304). The next year he was appointed Provincial Grand Chaplain for West Yorkshire. He was master of Philanthropic in 1856 and 1858, and the lodge history asserts that it thrived during the years of his regular attendance. He re-wrote their ritual in a unique form, which was shared with five daughter and granddaughter lodges.

He joined the Lodge of Antiquity in London in 1863, and that same year became Grand Chaplain of United Grand Lodge. While still Rector of Swillington, his new masonic duties took him to the consecration of many new lodges, and saw him deliver the oration at the laying of the foundation stone for the new extension to Freemason's Hall in Great Queen Street, London, the next year. In the same period, Woodford started to contribute articles on masonic history, starting with his researches into the old York lodges. He became known to local booksellers as he began to collect old manuscripts.

1871 saw Woodford as one of the signatories of a remonstrance against the Privy Council for upholding a conviction of an Anglican Vicar, John Purchas, for the way in which he celebrated communion. The following year, he moved to London, resigning his living for a career in Masonic publishing.

== The Writer ==
In London, Woodford settled into a busy career as a writer and researcher. Contributing essays to several publications and periodicals, he also edited the Freemason and the Masonic Magazine, frequently contributing most of the copy himself. He compiled Kenning's Masonic Cyclopaedia for the publisher of the two magazines.

Woodford used the Freemason in 1879 to oppose a move in Grand Lodge to enforce uniformity of ritual on its lodges. His own letter on the subject provoked much correspondence, convincing Grand Lodge of the groundswell of resistance to such a move.

The last few years of his life were also occupied in collaboration with other Masonic researchers, such as Hughan and Gould, which eventually brought into being England's first research lodge, Quatuor Coronati. As acting Immediate Past Master, he guided the lodge through its first two years of existence, taking the chair in the frequent absences of the Master, Charles Warren, then Metropolitan Commissioner of Police. It is plain from Gould's obituary that the rest of the lodge looked on him as a mentor.

== Death and legacy ==
In December 1887, Woodford contracted septicaemia from an untreated foot injury. He died on 23 December. He is seen as a pioneer of the Authentic school of masonic research, applying proper historical methodology in place of carelessly repeated fable. He earnestly collected and studied early masonic manuscripts, writing the introduction for Hughan's published collection. He contributed greatly to an understanding of the enigmatic history of the York lodges in the eighteenth century. His lasting legacy may be seen in the continued activity and influence of Quatuor Coronati Lodge, and the rational approach to masonic history.

Lastly, he played at least some part in the establishment of the Hermetic Order of the Golden Dawn, passing the cipher manuscripts from which it was founded to his friend William Wynn Westcott shortly before his death. He had already made a strong case that the mystic and philosophical elements which allowed Freemasonry to evolve from a purely operative to a speculative society were likely to have been imported from some aspects of the Hermeticism practised during the Renaissance.
