= Lodge Mother Kilwinning =

Masonic lodge in Scotland

Coordinates: 55.654°N 4.698°W

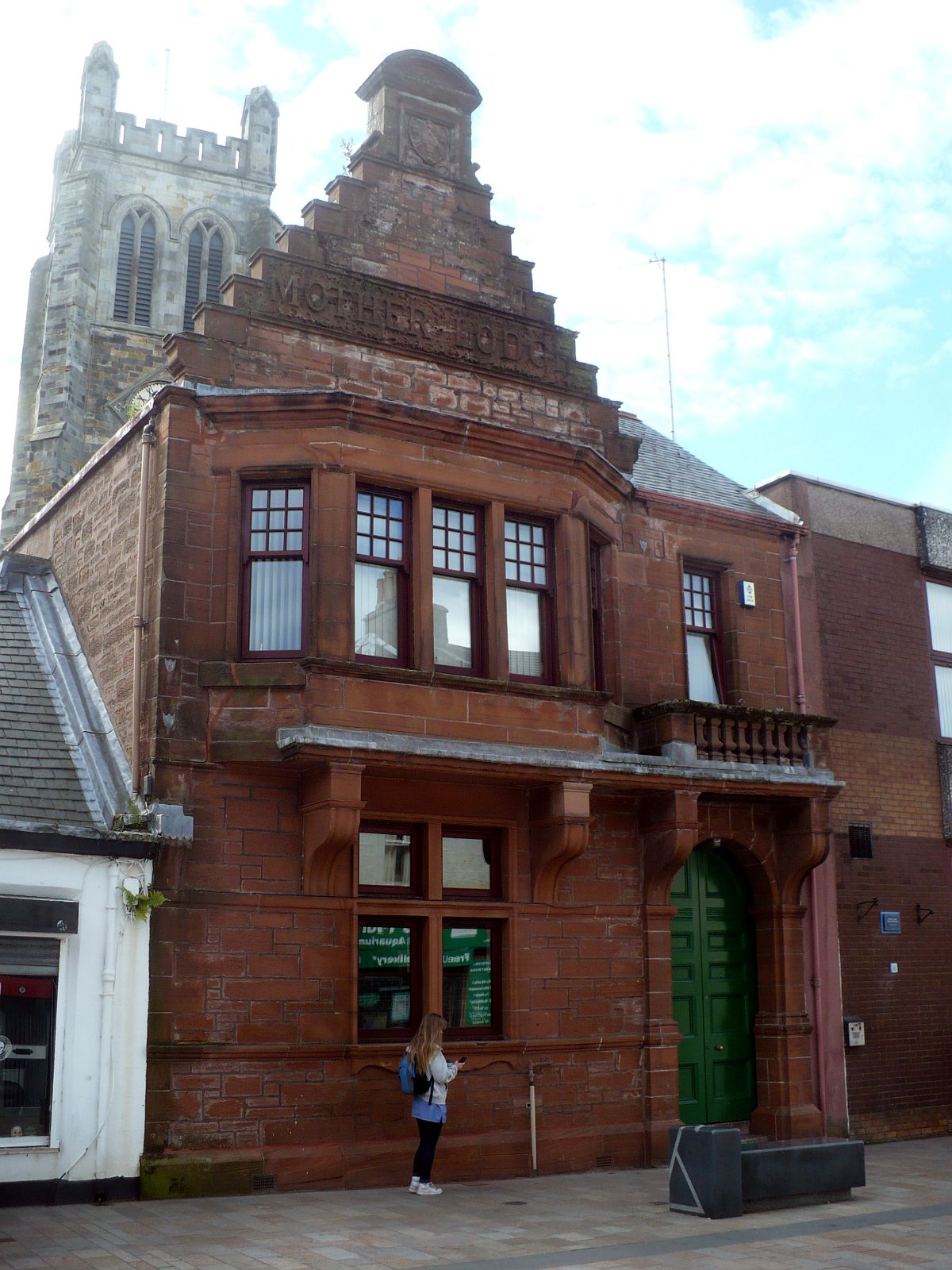
Mother Lodge building

Lodge Mother Kilwinning is a Masonic Lodge in Kilwinning, Scotland, under the auspices of the Grand Lodge of Scotland. It is number 0 (referred to as "nothing" and not zero) on the Roll, and is reputed by some to be the oldest Lodge not only in Scotland, but the world. There is no existing evidence to support this claim however. It is styled The Mother Lodge of Scotland attributing its origins to the 12th Century, and is often called Mother Kilwinning.

== History ==
Legend has it that Kilwinning Abbey was built by stonemasons who had travelled from Europe and established a lodge there, although Dunfermline Abbey was founded 34 years before it. . In 1599 William Schaw introduced the Second Schaw Statutes which specified that "ye warden of ye lug of Kilwynning" to "tak tryall of ye airt of memorie and science yrof, of everie fellowe of craft and everie prenteiss according to ayr of yr vocations".

As early as the reign of James VII, the lodge at Kilwinning was granting warrants for the formation of lodges elsewhere in Scotland, starting with Canongate Kilwinning, which in 1677 became the first known example in the world of a lodge granted a charter by an existing lodge. In 1736, the Grand Lodge of Scotland was organised and the Kilwinning lodge was one of its constituent lodges. That same year, it petitioned to be recognized as the oldest lodge in Scotland. However, as has happened so many times over Freemasonry's long history, the lodge's original records had been lost and the claim could not be proven. The petition was therefore rightly rejected, wherefore Kilwinning seceded and again acted as a grand lodge, organising lodges in Scotland and on the continent, as well as in Virginia and Ireland. Despite being unable to provide any new evidence to support their earlier claim, in 1807 Kilwinning "came once more into the bosom of the Grand Lodge, bringing with her all of her daughter Lodges."

== Provincial Grand Lodge of Kilwinning ==
Tradition demanded that whoever held the Mastery of the Mother Lodge would also be Provincial Grand Master of Ayrshire. As a result, many members transferred from other Lodges to Kilwinning. In 1983 this was changed; Mother Kilwinning was removed from the Province of Ayrshire and became subordinate to the Provincial Grand Lodge of Kilwinning. In consequence, the Lodge sends a representative to the Grand Lodge of Scotland to act as Grand Bible Bearer.

== Degrees ==
The lodge awards the three degrees of Craft Freemasonry, namely:

- Entered Apprentice
- Fellow Craft
- Master Mason

In keeping with the traditions of Freemasonry in Scotland, a Craft Lodge may also confer the Order of Mark Masons Degree which, whilst a completion of the Fellow [of] Craft, is conferred after the Master Mason degree.

== Mother Lodge Museum ==
The Mother Lodge Museum features Masonic artefacts and regalia, including medals, seals, decorative items, photographs and documents. Visits must be arranged ahead, and visitors can also tour the historic Lodge building.
