= Capilla del Cristo =

Historic chapel in Old San Juan, Puerto Rico

Chapel of the Christ
- Capilla del Santo Cristo de la Salud
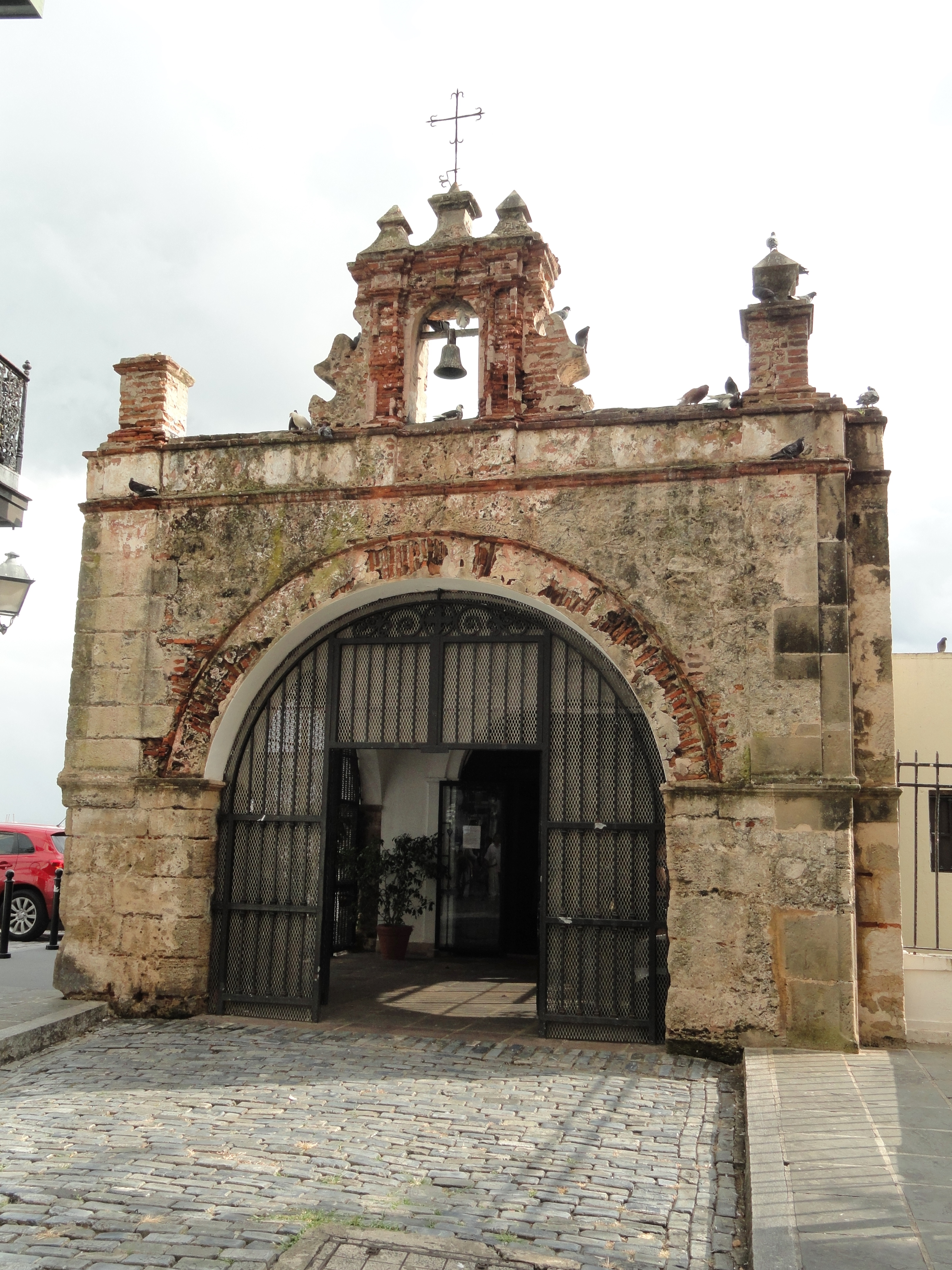
- Capilla del Cristo at the end of a cobblestone street
- Interactive map of the Chapel of the Christ area
- Alternative names: Capilla del Cristo

General information
- Architectural style: Baroque
- Location: Old San Juan
- Coordinates: 18°27′50.7″N 66°07′03.9″W
- Construction started: 1753
- Estimated completion: 1780
- Owner: Catholic Church

Technical details
- Material: Masonry
- Floor count: 1

Design and construction
- Engineer: Juan Francisco Mestre
- Known for: Folklore, historic architecture
- Capilla del Cristo
- U.S. National Historic Landmark District – Contributing property
- Part of: Old San Juan Historic District (ID72001553)
- Designated NHLDCP: October 10, 1972

Capilla del Cristo (Chapel of Christ), also called Capilla del Santo Cristo de la Salud is a small chapel / museum located in Old San Juan, Puerto Rico. Built in the 18th century and saved from demolition in the 20th century and preserved, the structure has become a cultural icon of Puerto Rico. Most of the objects on its altar are from 1753. Travel guides list Capilla del Cristo as one of the must-see places of Old San Juan.

== Cultural significance ==
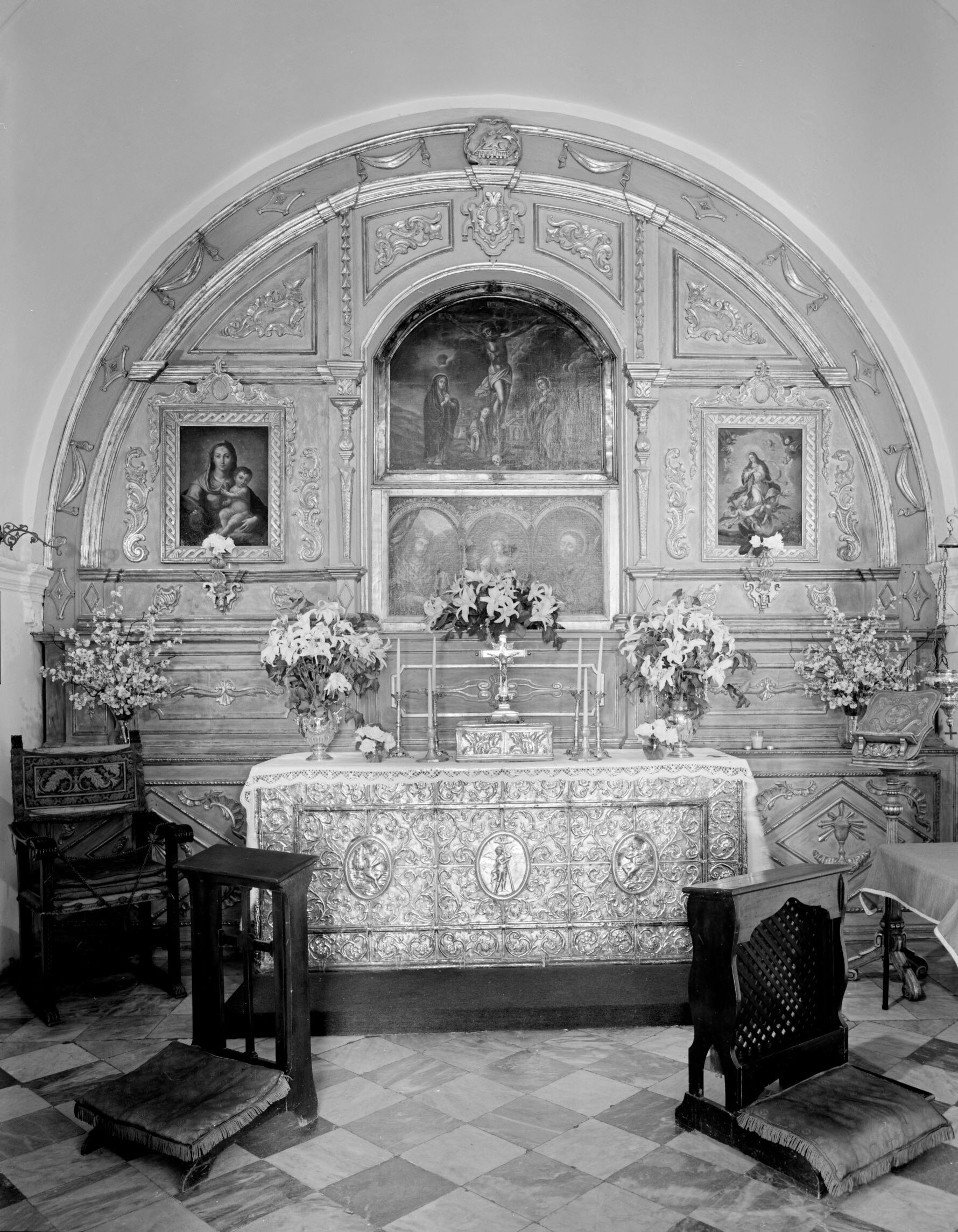
Altar of Capilla del Cristo, photograph by Carol M. Highsmith

The chapel with its belfry is located at the end of Calle del Cristo, a pedestrian walkway in the Old San Juan Historic District in the western section of San Juan Islet. Images of the chapel's facade are quite popular, and sometimes featured on the covers of Puerto Rican travel guides as well as on canvas prints, posters, and mug souvenirs.

Inside the chapel are paintings by Jose Campeche and a painting by Jorge Sen called El Milagro (English: The Miracle). Its altar is made of silver and gold.

The Races of St. John and St. Peter (Las carreras de S. Juan y S. Pedro) is an annual festival on Calle del Cristo held from 24 June (Saint John’s Day) to 29 June (the Feast of Saints Peter and Paul), and with origins sometime before the mid-19th century.

== Location ==
Capilla del Cristo is located at the end of Calle del Cristo in the Historic District of Old San Juan near La Fortaleza, the official residence of the governor of Puerto Rico.

== Architecture ==
The basic structure of the small temple is mampostería ordinaria or stones held together by mortar or cement. It's a one-story-high, brick and stone structure with a curved belfry atop. Its gate was added in the 1940s for the protection of its interior. It has three oversized arches which open up to the Parque de Palomas, Tetuan Street, and Calle de Cristo de la Salud (street). Built in the Spanish Baroque style, Extremaduran Juan Francisco Mestre was the author of its design. The building has been kept in good condition by the volunteer group Cristo de la Salud Brotherhood.

== Folklore ==
Religious folklore, particularly among Catholics, said that during a horse race on Calle del Cristo, a young rider and his horse took a bad fall. The rider went over the precipice but was miraculously saved.

The chapel was built where the fateful race was said to have occurred in honor of the young rider named Baltazar Montañez. It became a destination for tourists as well as pilgrims, who would occasionally leave an ex-voto at the chapel. It is only open on Tuesdays.

Different versions of the legend mention that either the rider or Tomás Mateo Pratts, an observer yelled for divine intervention. In a book about Puerto Rican legends, José Ramírez-Rivera writes that the horse died but Baltazar lived. Afterwards, permission was granted to build the Catholic chapel and festivals were held for years afterward to celebrate the miracle.

In his writings about Baltazar, Puerto Rican historian Cayetano Coll y Toste described him as a slave who worked in the sugarcane fields of Puerto Rico but made no mention of the legendary accident.

== Gallery ==
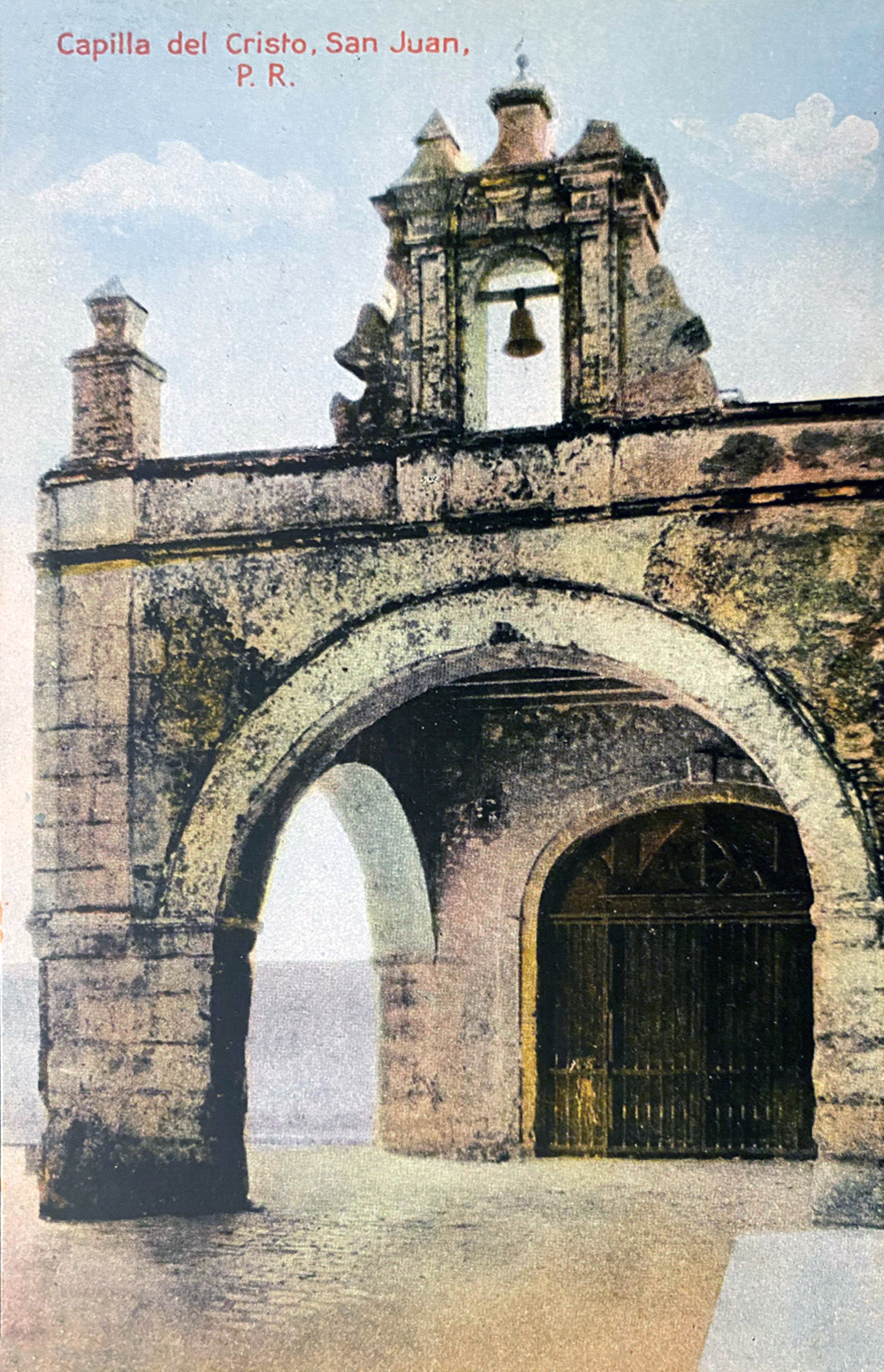
Capilla del Cristo in 1915. Printed in Germany.

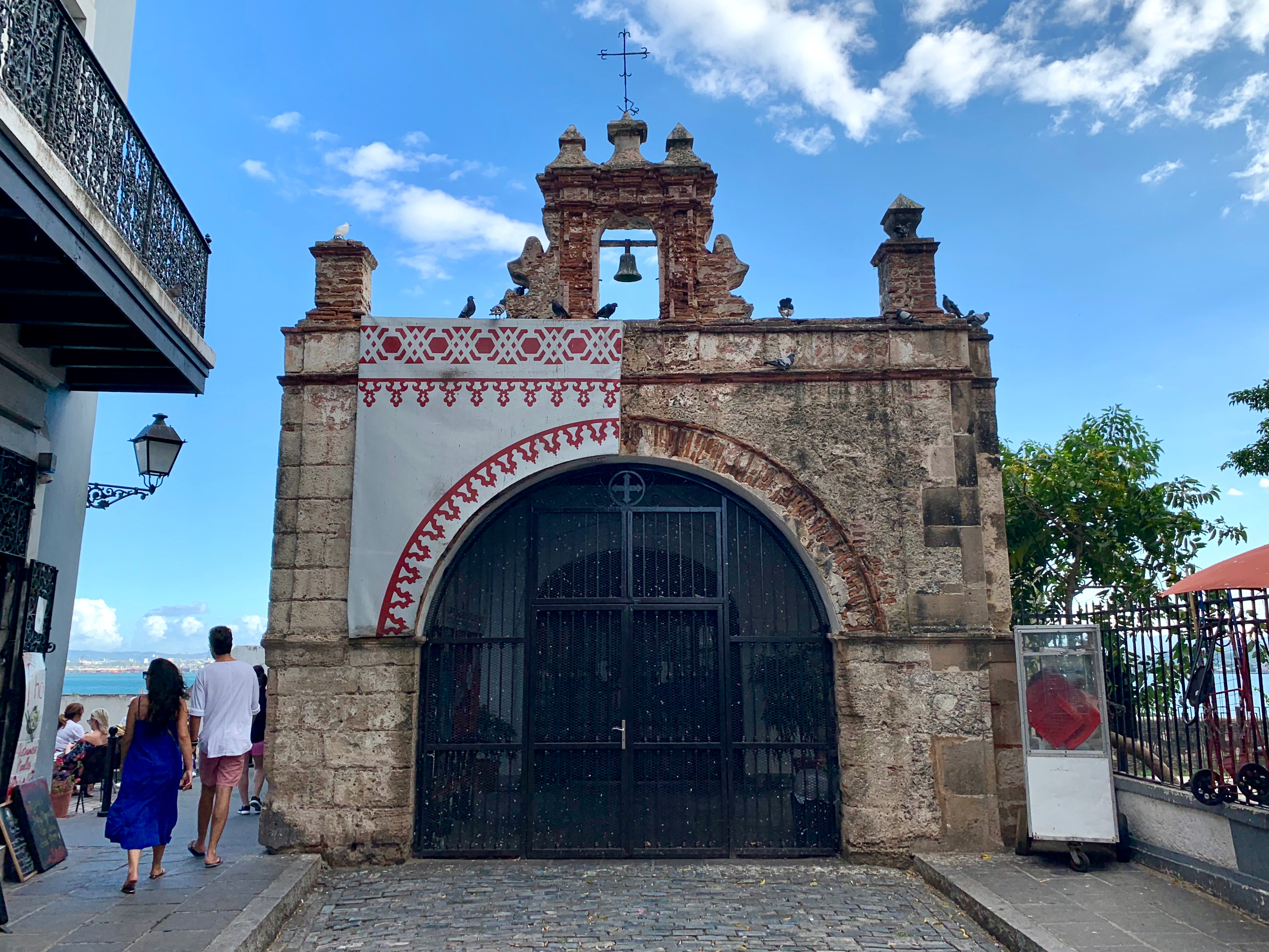
Capilla del Cristo de la Salud in 2019

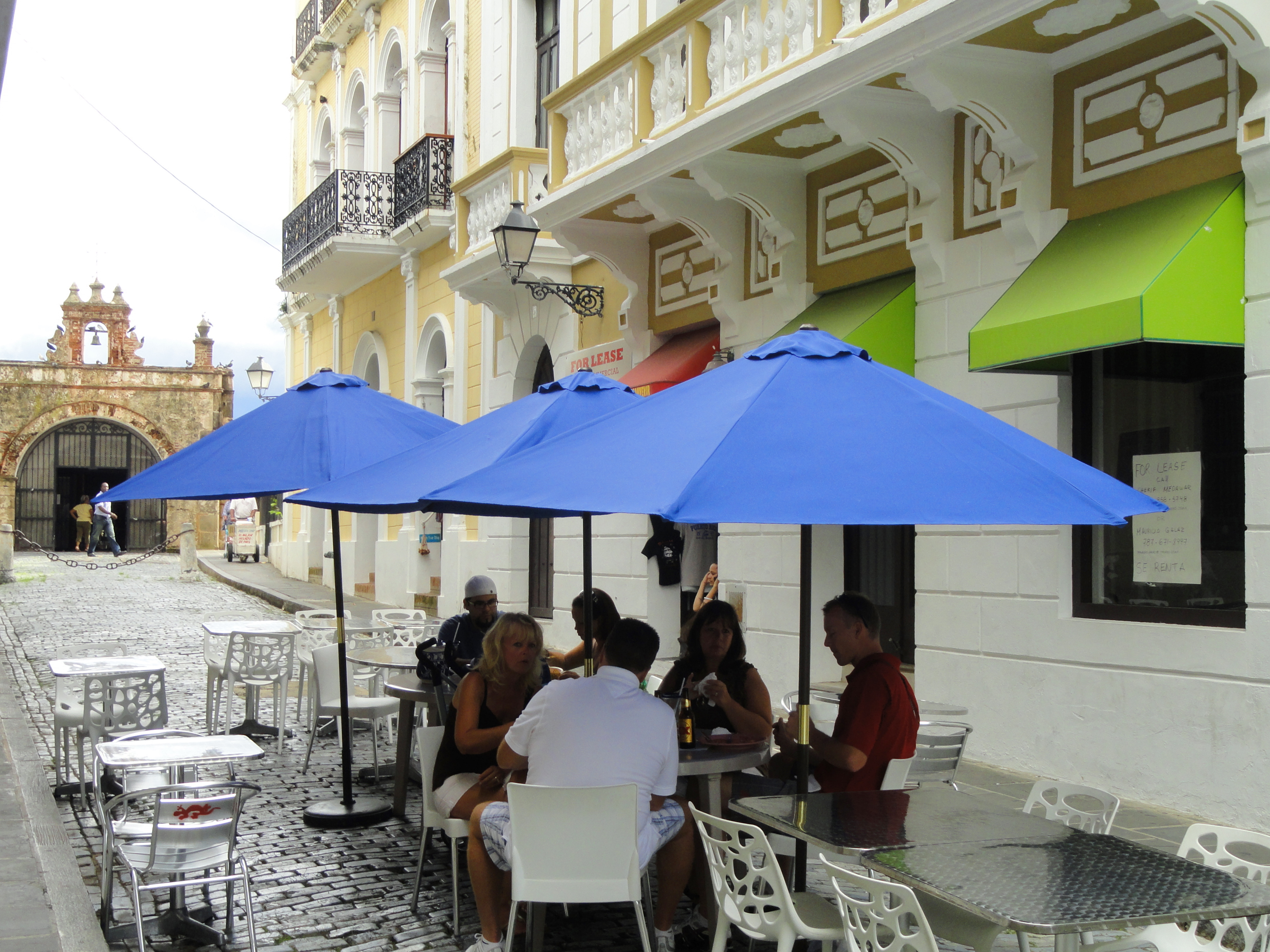
Men sitting at table in front of the chapel

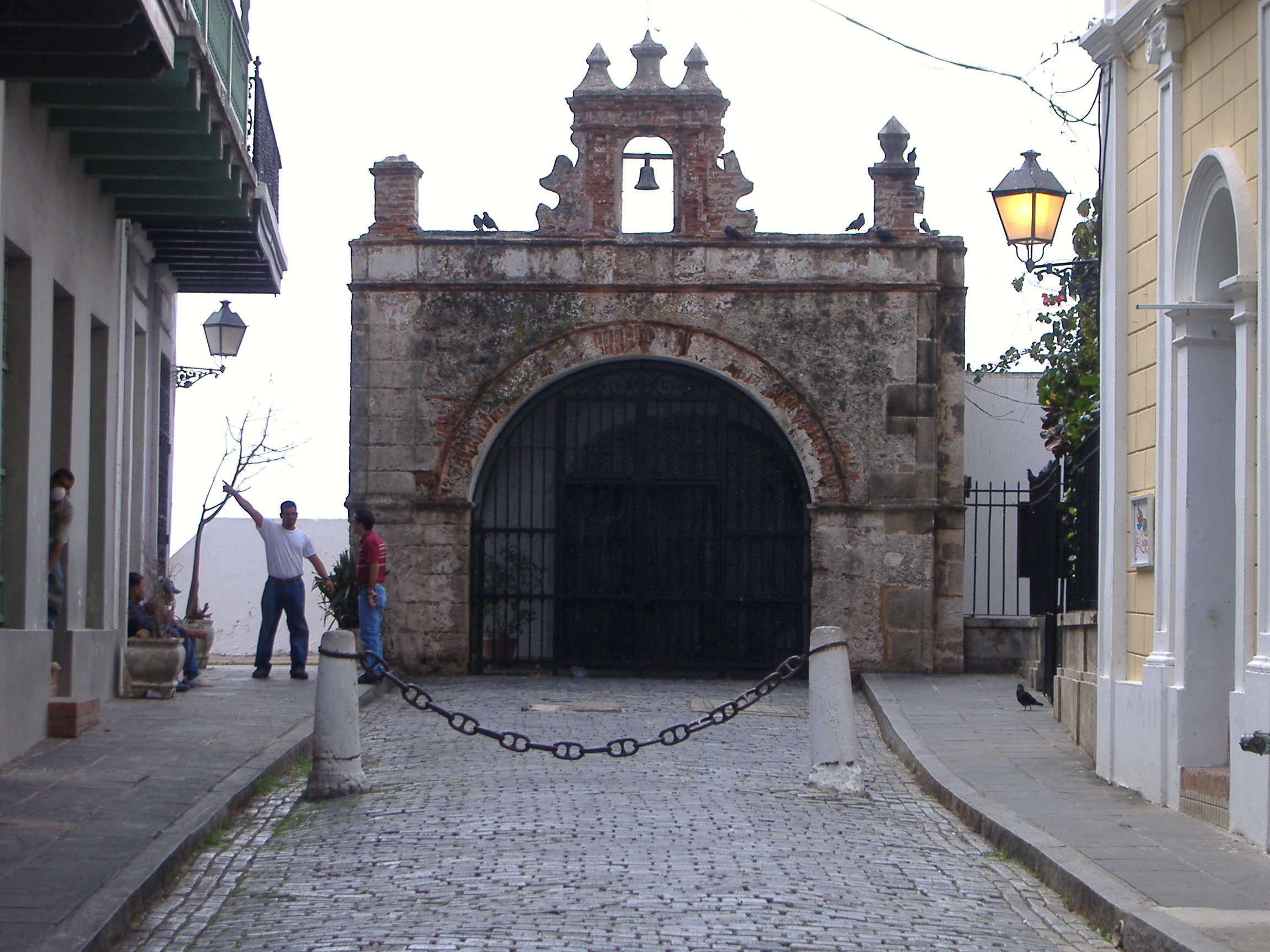
Facade of chapel

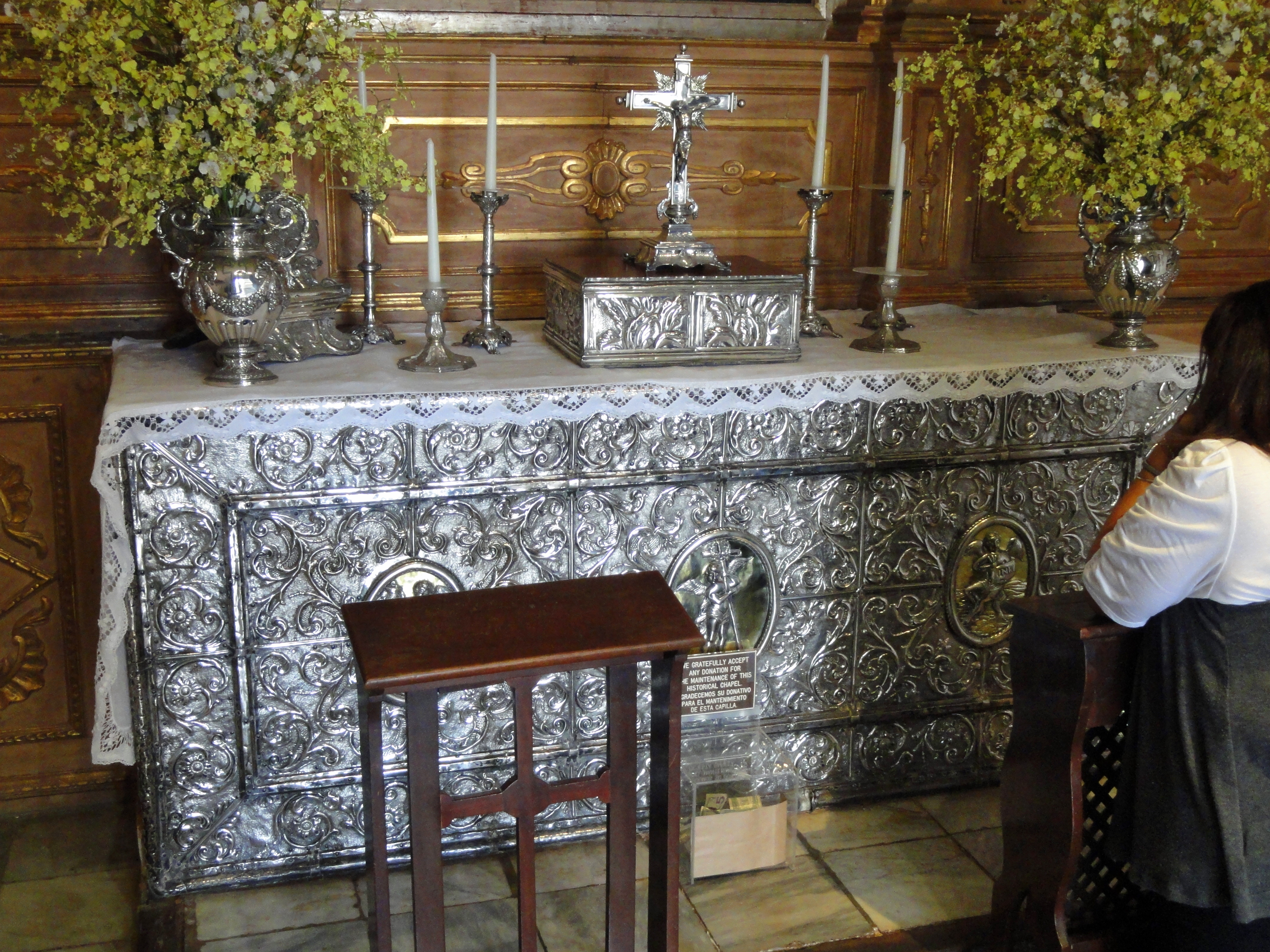
Silver altar inside the chapel

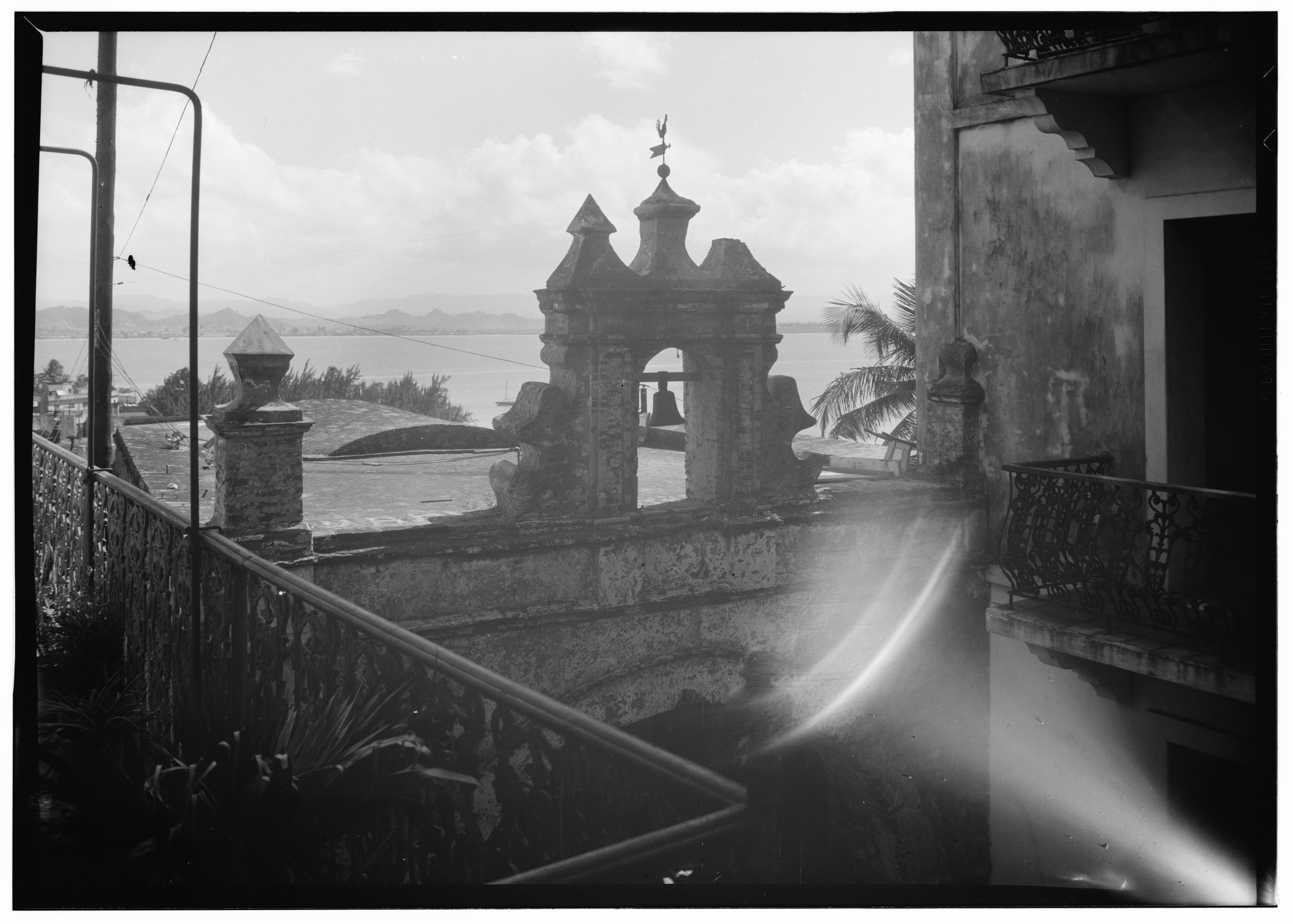
Historic American Buildings surveyed in 1933, photograph of Capilla del Cristo at Calle del Cristo and Tetuan Streets in Old San Juan, Puerto Rico filed in the Library of Congress archives

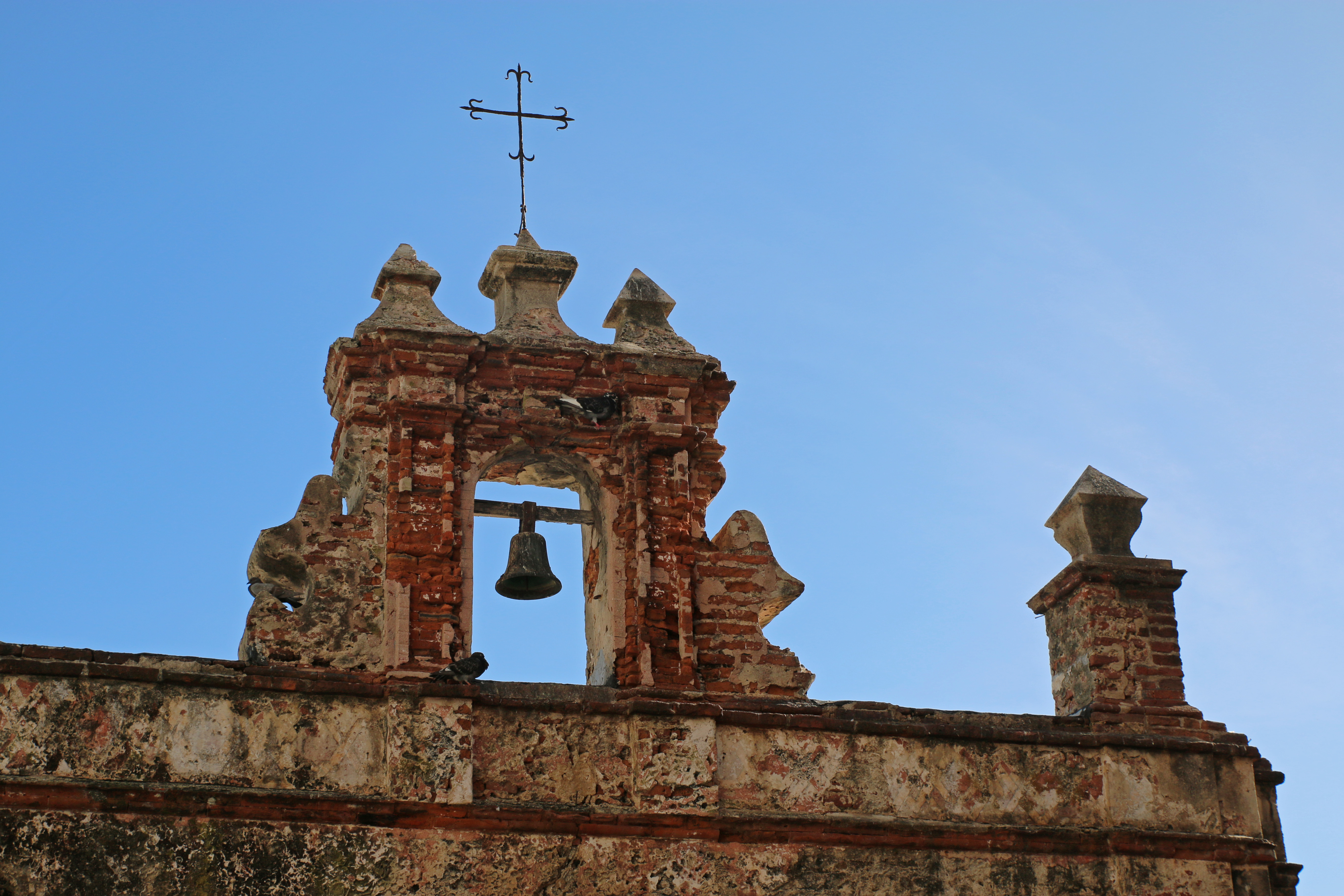
Bell tower

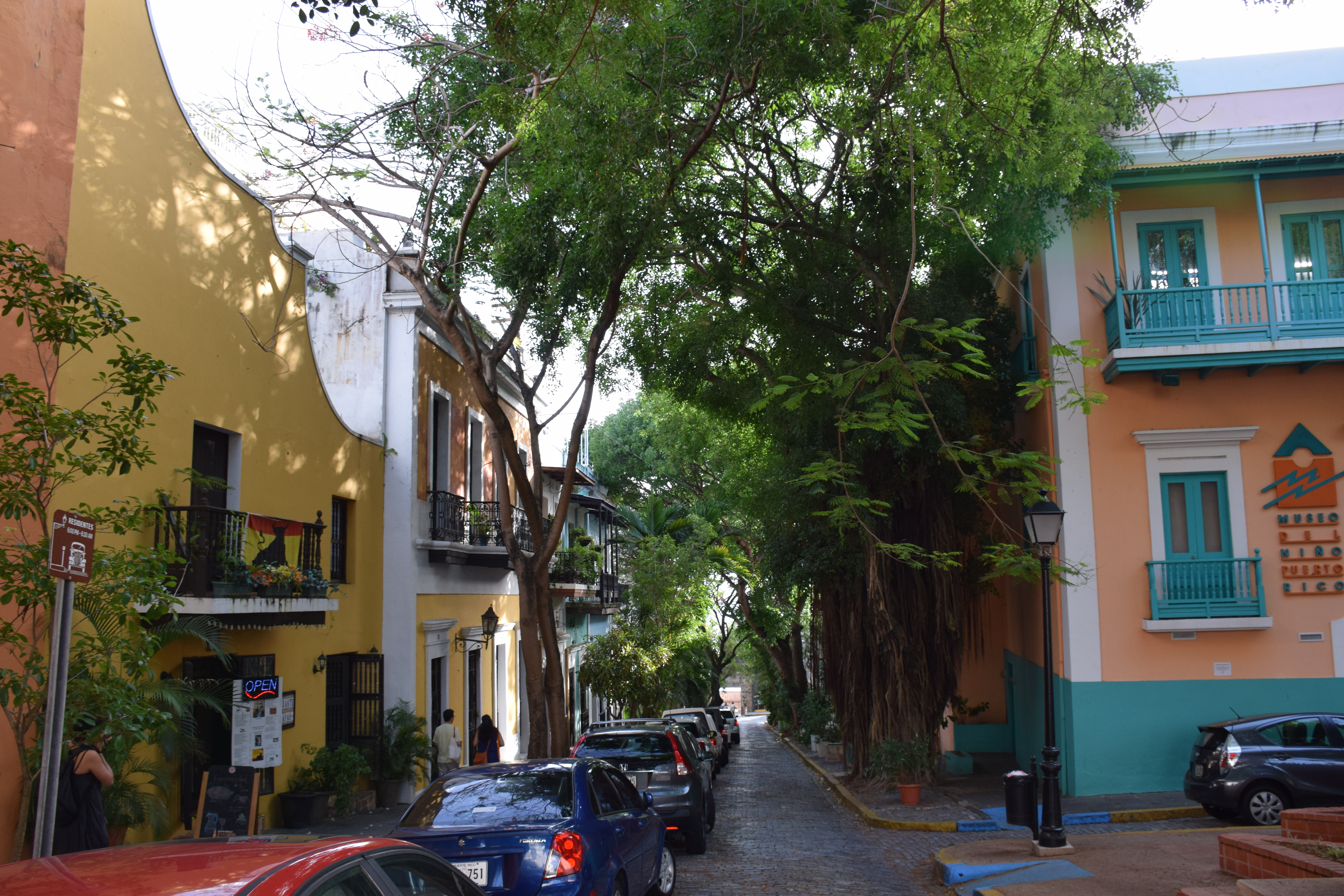
At the other end of Calle del Cristo

== See also ==
- Cathedral of San Juan, Puerto Rico
- San José Church
- Casa Blanca (San Juan)
- Irish immigration to Puerto Rico
