= St. John's Day =

St. John's Day may refer to:

- Nativity of John the Baptist, various dates (24 June in Western Christianity)
- John the Evangelist § Feast day, various dates (27 December in Western Christianity)
- St. John's Day, Masonic feast either John the Baptist or John the Evangelist

== See also ==
- Category:Saint John's Day, events related to the feast of the Nativity of John the Baptist
- Other feast days of saints named John:
  - Beheading of John the Baptist, various dates (29 August in Western Christianity)
  - Saint John (disambiguation)
  - Category:Liturgical calendars
- Saint John's Eve, eve of the feast of the Nativity of Saint John the Baptist
- John Day (disambiguation)
