= Nativity of John the Baptist =

Christian feast day celebrating the birth of John the Baptist

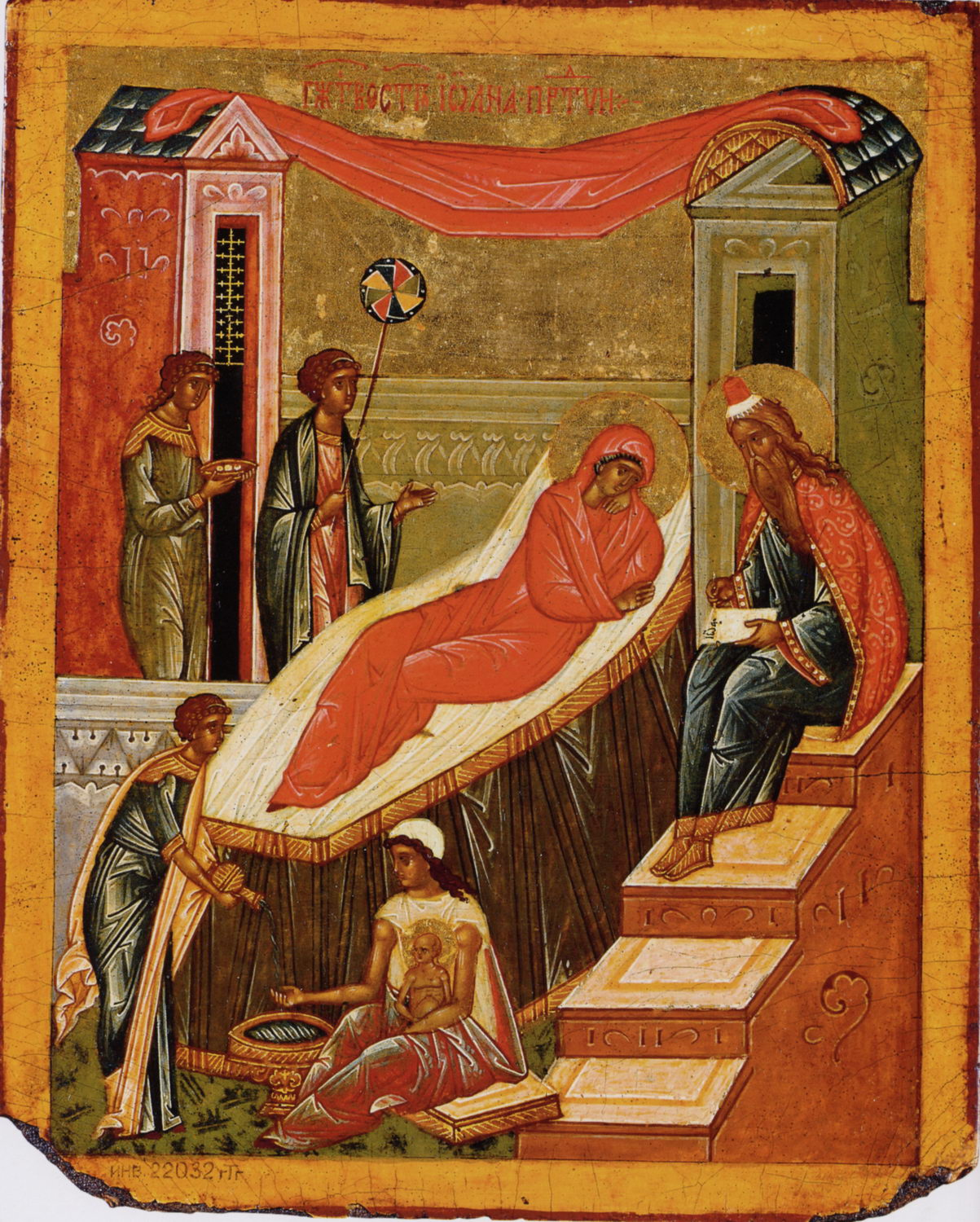
- Russian icon of the Nativity of John the Baptist
- Observed by: Eastern Orthodox Church; Oriental Orthodox Churches; Catholic Church; Lutheran Churches; Anglican Churches
- Type: Christian
- Significance: Celebrates the birth of John the Baptist, Jesus' precursor and relative
- Celebrations: Religious services
- Date: June 24
- Frequency: Annual
- Related to: Christmas; Epiphany the Visitation; Dehwa Daimana; Midsummer

The Nativity of John the Baptist (or Birth of John the Baptist, or Nativity of the Forerunner, or colloquially Johnmas or St. John's Day (in German Johanni or Johannistag) is a Christian feast day. It is observed annually on 24 June. The Nativity of John the Baptist is a high-ranking liturgical feast, kept in the Catholic Church, Eastern Orthodox Church, Anglicanism, and Lutheranism. The sole biblical account of the birth of John the Baptist comes from the Gospel of Luke.

== Significance ==
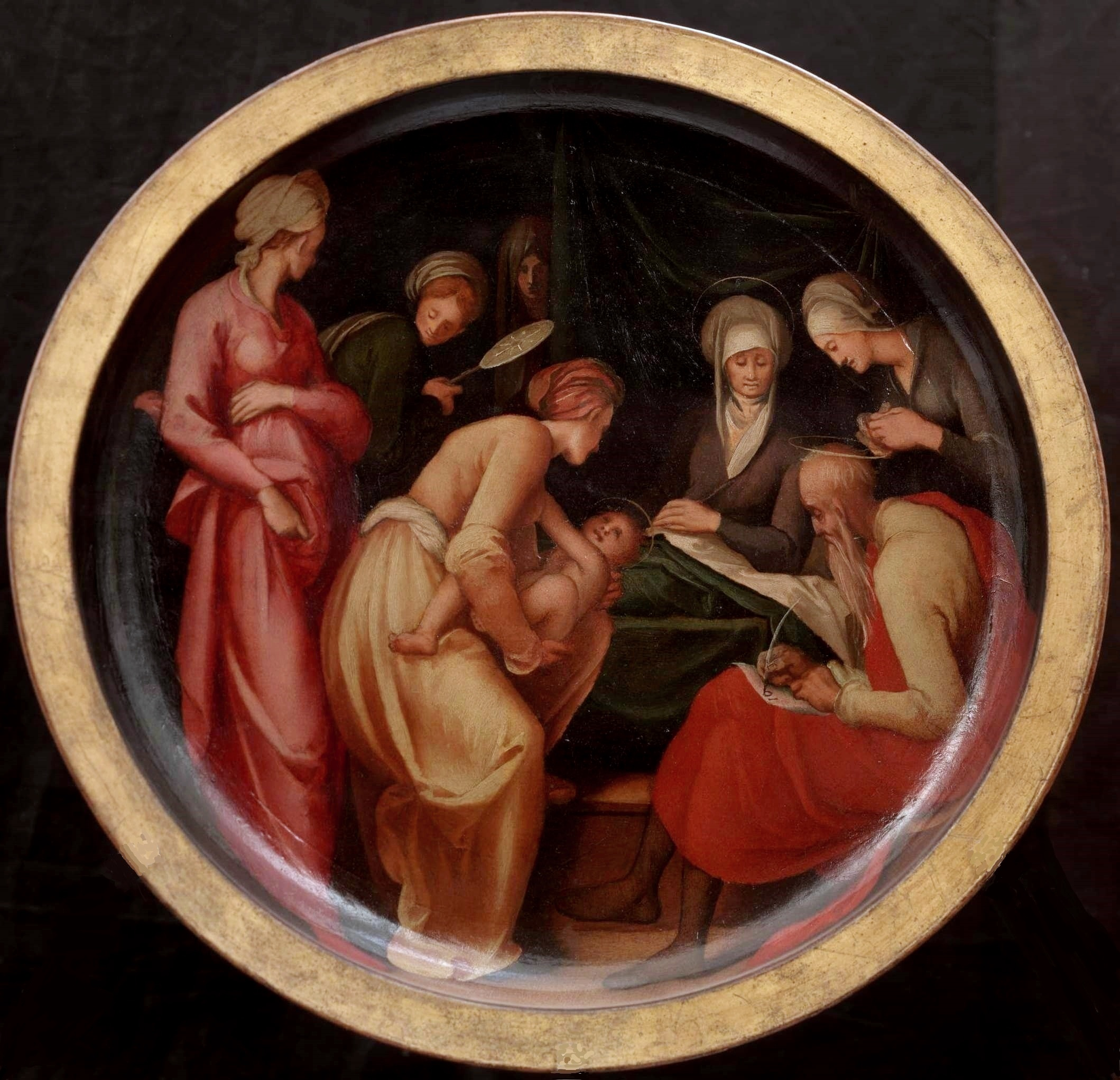
Nativity of Saint John the Baptist, Zechariah writing, "His name is John". Pontormo, on a desco da parto, c. 1526.

Christians have long interpreted the life of John the Baptist as a preparation for the coming of Jesus Christ, and the circumstances of his birth, as recorded in the New Testament, are miraculous. John's pivotal place in the gospel is seen in the emphasis Luke gives to the announcement of his birth and the event itself, both set in parallel to the same occurrences in the life of Jesus.

The sole biblical account of the birth of John the Baptist comes from the Gospel of Luke. John's parents, Zechariah or Zachary—a Jewish priest—and Elizabeth, were without children and both were beyond the age of child-bearing. During Zechariah's rotation to serve in the Temple in Jerusalem, he was chosen by lot to offer incense at the Golden Altar in the Holy of Holies. The Archangel Gabriel appeared to him and announced that he and his wife would give birth to a child, and that they should name him John, a name which was unfamiliar in Zechariah and Elizabeth's families. Acts 4:6 refers to a "John" among the high priests who challenged the apostles' preaching after Pentecost, so the name was not unknown within the wider priestly family. However, because Zechariah did not believe the message of Gabriel, he was rendered speechless until the time of John's birth. At that time, his relatives wanted to name the child after his father, and Zechariah wrote, "His name is John", whereupon he recovered his ability to speak (Luke 1:5–25; 1:57–66). Following Zechariah's obedience to the command of God, he was given the gift of prophecy and foretold the future ministry of Jesus, this prophecy forming the text of the Benedictus canticle.

== Liturgical celebrations ==
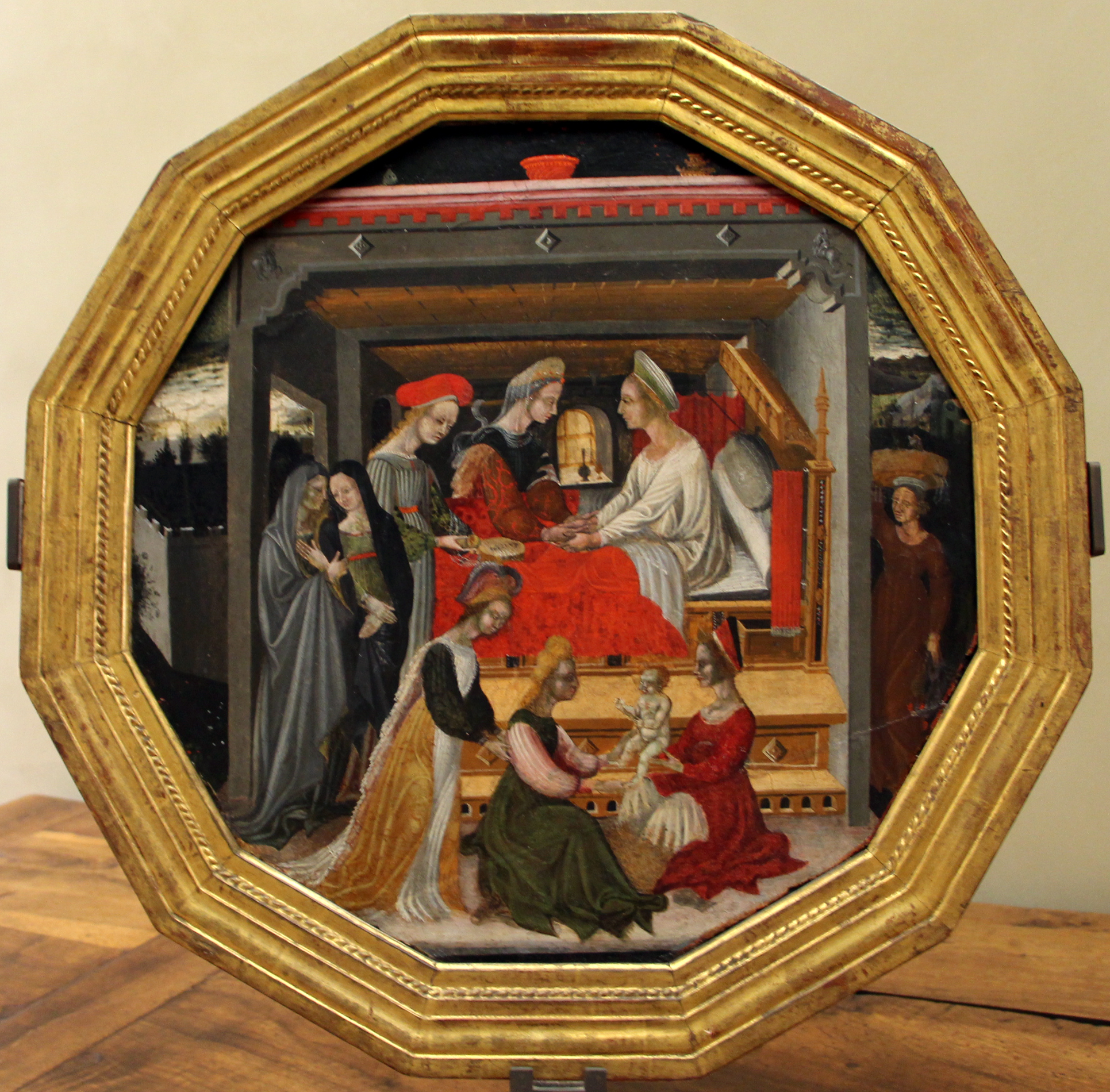
Desco da parto with the birth given a contemporary setting, Siena, c. 1420–1440

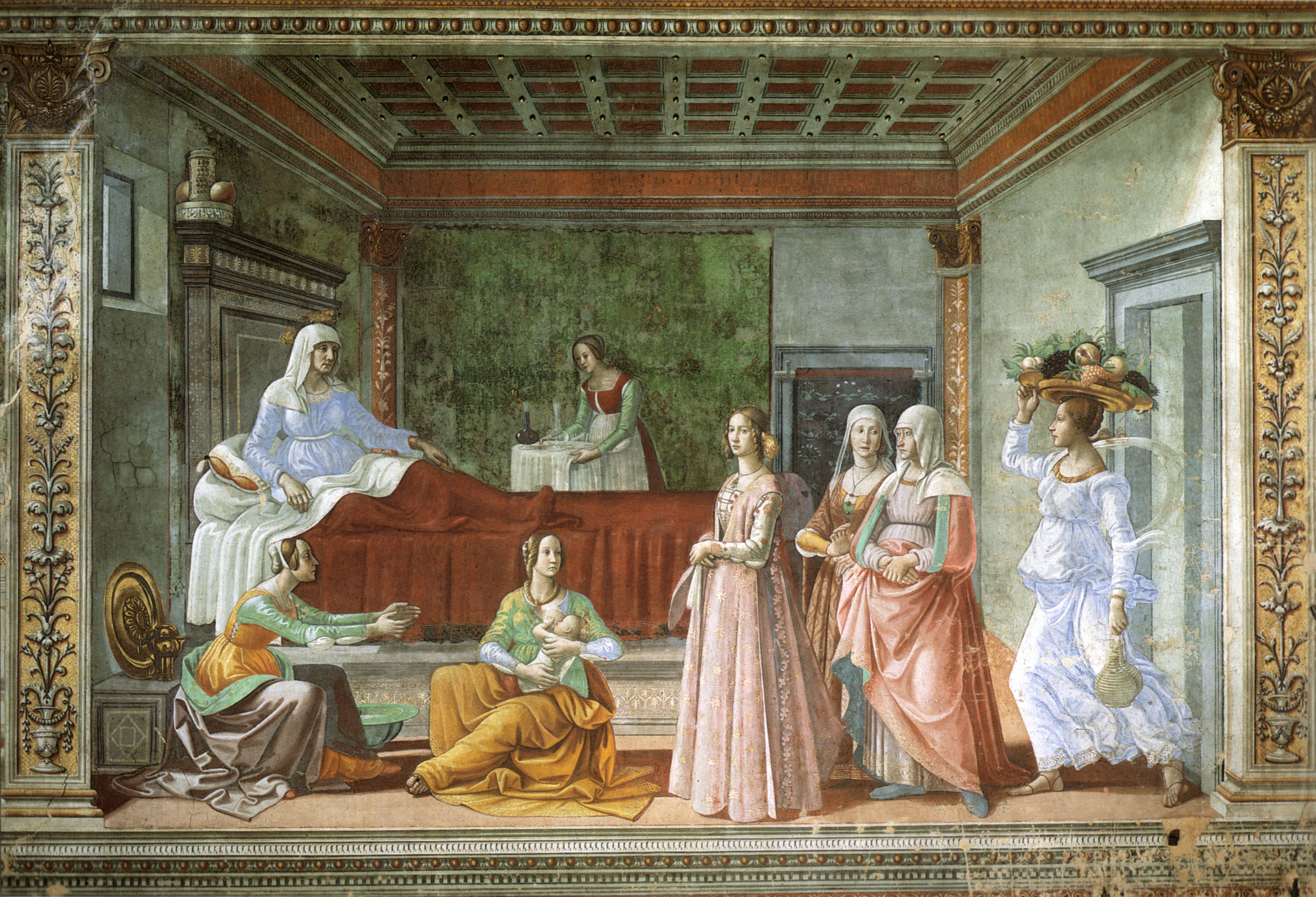
Tornabuoni Chapel by Domenico Ghirlandaio and workshop, 1485–1490

At the Annunciation, when the angel Gabriel appeared to the Virgin Mary to inform her that she would conceive of the Holy Ghost, he also informed her that Elizabeth, her cousin, was already six months pregnant (Luke 1:36). Mary then journeyed to visit Elizabeth. Luke's Gospel recounts that the baby "leapt" in Elizabeth's womb at the greeting of Mary (Luke 1:44).

The Nativity of John the Baptist on June 24 comes three months after the celebration on March 25 of the Annunciation, when the angel Gabriel told Mary that her cousin Elizabeth was in her sixth month of pregnancy, and six months before the Christmas celebration of the birth of Jesus. The purpose of these festivals is not to celebrate the exact dates of these events, but simply to commemorate them in an interlinking way. The Nativity of John the Baptist anticipates the feast of Christmas.

The Nativity of John the Baptist is one of the oldest festivals of the Christian church, being listed by the Council of Agde in 506 as one of that region's principal festivals, where it was a day of rest and, like Christmas, was celebrated with three Masses: a vigil, at dawn, and at midday.

It is one of the patronal feasts of the Order of Malta.

=== In Western Christianity ===
Ordinarily, the day of a saint's death is usually celebrated as their feast day, because it marks their dies natalis, or "birthday", into eternal life. To this rule there are two notable exceptions: the birthday of the Blessed Virgin Mary and that of John the Baptist. According to Roman Catholic tradition and teaching, Mary was free from original sin from the first moment of her existence (her conception itself is commemorated by a separate feast), while John was cleansed of original sin in the womb of his mother (which is not taught in other Western Christian traditions).

The Nativity of John the Baptist, though not a widespread public holiday outside of Quebec, Catalonia, Lithuania, Latvia, and Puerto Rico, is a high-ranking liturgical feast, kept in the Roman Catholic, Anglican and Lutheran churches. In the Roman Rite, it has been celebrated since 1970 as a solemnity; in the 1962 form of that Roman Rite it a first class feast and in still earlier forms as a Double of the First Class with common Octave. Due to its liturgical ranking it takes precedence over a Sunday in Ordinary time on which it happens to fall. However, it does not take precedence over the feasts of the Lord. In this case the feast of the Nativity of John the Baptist is transferred to June 23 in the Roman Rite; in the 1962 rite, the feast is transferred to June 25 instead.

Like the Birth of the Virgin, the subject is often shown in art, especially from Florence, whose patron saint John is. It was often given a prosperous contemporary setting, and often only the presence of a halo or two distinguishes it on a desco da parto or birth tray from a secular depiction of a mother receiving visitors while lying-in. The scene in the fresco cycle of the life of John in the Tornabuoni Chapel in the church of Santa Maria Novella in Florence is probably the most famous, created by Domenico Ghirlandaio and his workshop between 1485 and 1490.

The reformer Martin Luther wrote a hymn about baptism, "Christ unser Herr zum Jordan kam", which became associated with the Baptist's day. The feast was celebrated in Lutheran Leipzig, Johann Sebastian Bach composed three church cantatas for the occasion, especially a chorale cantata on Luther's hymn:

- Ihr Menschen, rühmet Gottes Liebe, BWV 167, 24 June 1723
- Christ unser Herr zum Jordan kam, BWV 7, 24 June 1724
- Freue dich, erlöste Schar, BWV 30, 24 June 1738 or a later year

=== In Eastern Christianity ===
In the Eastern Orthodox Church and other Eastern Christian Churches, St John the Baptist is usually called St John the Forerunner, a title used also in the West ("Πρόδρομος" Pródromos in Greek, "Precursor" in Latin). This title indicates that the purpose of his ministry was to prepare the way for the coming of Jesus Christ. In the Byzantine Rite, the Feast of his Nativity is celebrated on June 24. It is a major feast day and is celebrated with an All-Night Vigil. It has an Afterfeast of one day. The feast usually falls during the Apostles' Fast (in Orthodox Churches that follow the Julian calendar, this feast always falls during the Apostles' Fast).

In addition to the birth of John the Baptist, the Byzantine Rite also has the following commemorations of the life of John the Baptist:

- January 7 – The Synaxis of St John the Forerunner (main feast day, immediately after Theophany (Epiphany) on January 6)
- February 24 – First and Second Finding of the Head of St. John the Forerunner
- May 25 – Third Finding of the Head of St. John the Forerunner
- August 29 – The Beheading of St. John the Forerunner
- September 23 – Conception of St John the Forerunner and the Commemoration of Sts. Zechariah and Elizabeth.

The Armenian Apostolic Church commemorates the "Birth of John the Forerunner" on January 15, and June 7 is the "Commemoration Day of St John the Forerunner". September 1 is the Feast of "Saints John the Forerunner and Job the Righteous".

- In Ukraine Ivan Kupala Day is celebrated on the 24th of June, in Belarus and Russia the holiday is observed on the 7th of July.

== Celebration ==
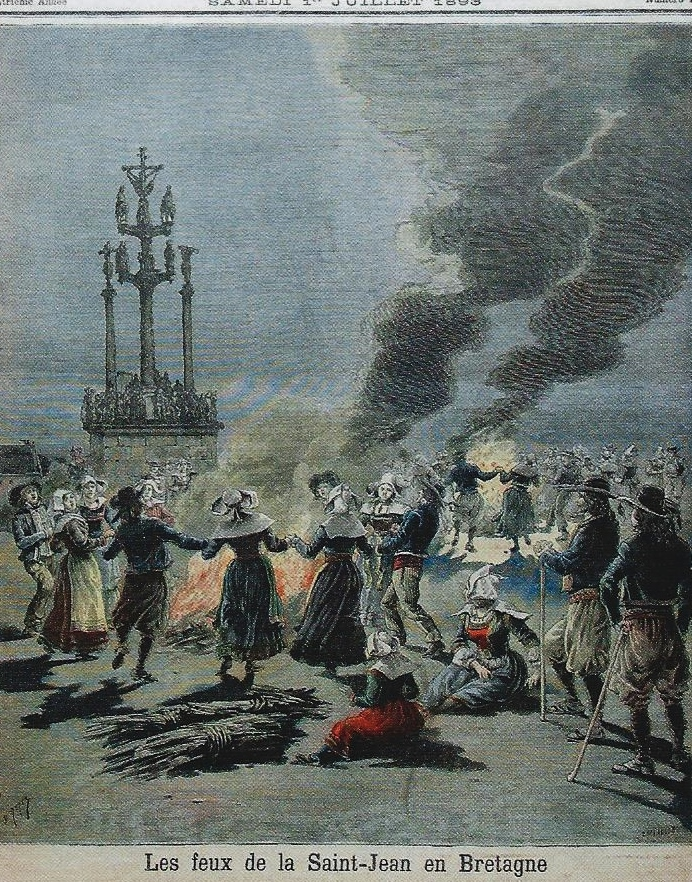
Bonfire with dancing in front of a calvary in Brittany, 1893

The question would naturally arise as to why the celebration falls on June 24 rather than June 25 if the date is to be precisely six months before Christmas. It has often been claimed that the Church authorities wanted to Christianize the pagan solstice celebrations and for this reason advanced Saint John's feast as a substitute. This explanation is questionable because in the Middle Ages the solstice took place around the middle of June due to the inaccuracy of the Julian calendar. It was only in 1582, through the Gregorian calendar reform, that the solstice returned to June 21 as it had been in the fourth century.

Therefore, a more likely reason why the festival falls on June 24 lies in the Roman way of counting, which proceeded backward from the Kalends (first day) of the succeeding month. Christmas was "the eighth day before the Kalends of January" (Octavo Kalendas Januarii). Consequently, Saint John's Nativity was put on the "eighth day before the Kalends of July". However, since June has only thirty days, in our present (Germanic) way of counting, the feast falls on June 24.

Nevertheless, the fact of the feast falling around the time of the solstice is considered by many to be significant, recalling the words of John the Baptist with regard to Jesus: "He must increase, but I must decrease".

=== Customs ===
All over Europe "Saint John's fires" are lit on mountains and hilltops on the eve of his feast. As the first day of summer, Saint John's Day is considered in folklore one of the great "charmed" festivals of the year. Hidden treasures are said to lie open in lonely places, waiting for the lucky finder. Divining rods should be cut on this day. Herbs are given unusual powers of healing, which they retain if they are plucked during the night of the feast. In Germany they call these herbs Johanneskraut (St. John's herbs), and people bring them to church for a special blessing. In Scandinavia and in the Slavic countries it is an ancient superstition that on Saint John's Day witches and demons are allowed to roam the earth. As at Halloween, children go the rounds and demand "treats", straw figures are thrown into the flames, and much noise is made to drive the demons away.

El Dia de San Juan is celebrated in Tucson, Arizona, United States. According to tradition, this day marks the beginning of the monsoon season. There is a legend that the Spanish explorer Francisco Vásquez de Coronado prayed for rain on June 24, 1540. Right after his prayers, it rained. John the Baptist ritually cleansed the faithful of their sins in the Jordan River. So people of Mexico and the American Southwest once followed morning mass on June 24 with a dip fully clothed in the nearest body of water. In the last part of the twentieth century, public celebrations of El Dia de San Juan faded in Tucson. Public fiestas on the nearby Tohono O'odham reservation also disappeared. In 1998, the City of Tucson in partnership with neighborhoods and private organizations revived the tradition of "El Dia de San Juan".

In the seventh century, Saint Eligius warned against midsummer activities and encouraged new converts to avoid them in favor of the celebration of St. John the Baptist's birth.

== In Mandaeism ==
In Mandaeism, the birthday of John the Baptist is celebrated on Dehwa Daimana (written as Dihba ḏ-Yamana, Dihba Daimana, or Dihba Rba ḏ-Daima in Mandaic). Children are baptized for the first time during this festival. It is celebrated on the first day of Hiṭia, which is the 11th month of the Mandaean calendar.

== See also ==
- Ein Karem
- Nativity of Saint John the Baptist, patron saint archive
- Saint John's Eve
- St. John's Day (disambiguation)
- St. John's Day, Masonic feast
- Category:Saint John's Day

Nativity of John the Baptist Life of Jesus
Preceded by Genealogy of Jesus	New Testament; Events	Succeeded by Annunciation
