= El Paseo de Amancaes y prisión de los maricones =

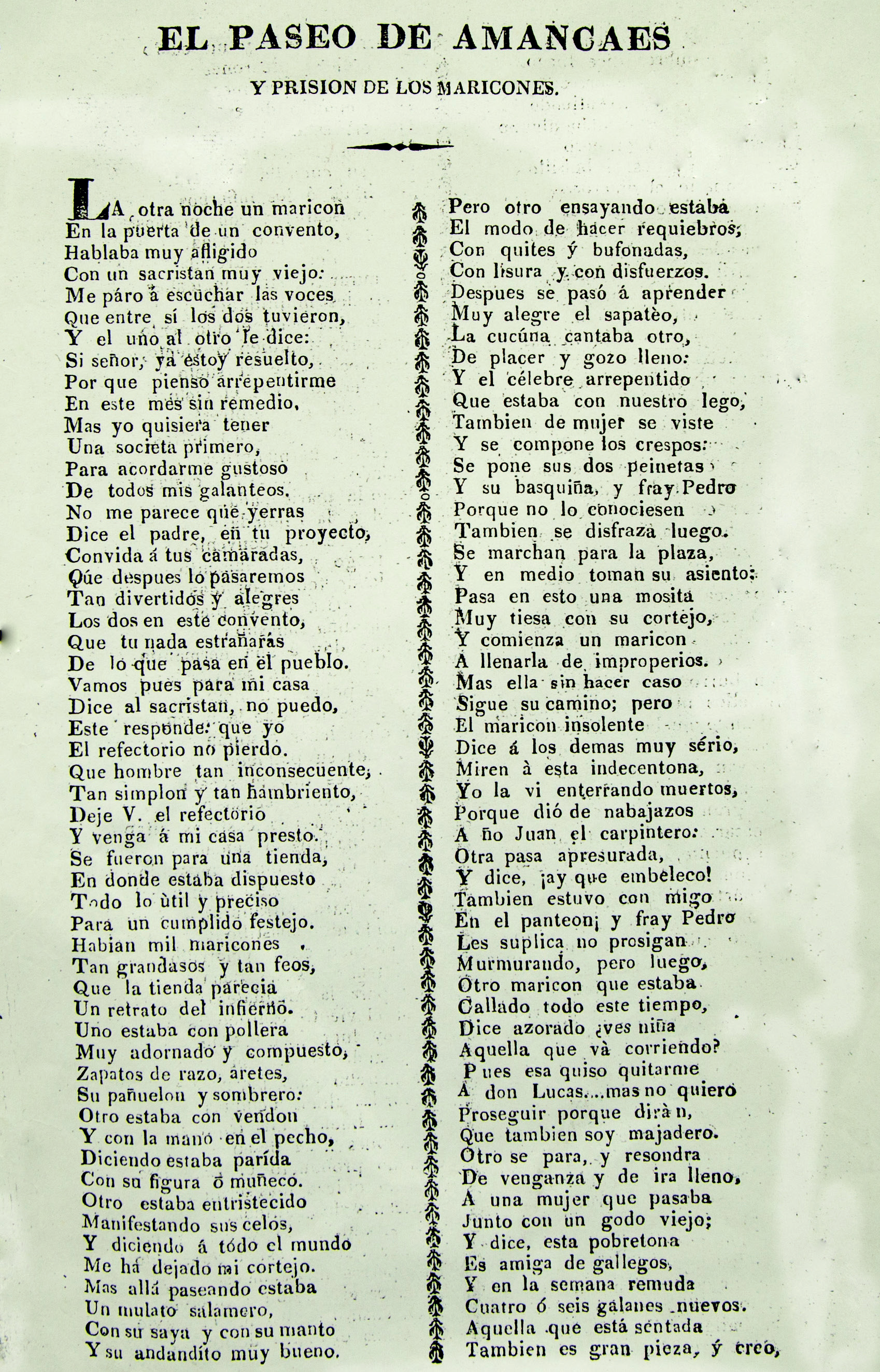
- Created: circa 1830

El Paseo de Amancaes y prisión de los maricones (lit. The Paseo de Amancaes and prison of the faggots) is a document by an anonymous author, published in Peru in the first decades of the 19th century and circulated in the city of Lima as a pamphlet. The document, which recounts a short story in the form of a social satire of a frustrated walk by a group of transvestites, is written in verse, and uses octosyllabic lines and assonant rhyme.

== Content ==
The pamphlet, written during the transition from the Viceroyalty of Peru to the Peruvian Republic, tells a short story as a form of social satire, in which an old sacristan converses with a homosexual. It also recounts the preparations of a group of transvestites to attend the Amancaes festival —a popular celebration held on June 24, Saint John's Eve, in the Amancaes plains near Lima —their criticisms of the women strolling about, their subsequent imprisonment by the authorities, and the sacristan's anger at seeing the group of transvestites' jubilation as they are taken to jail. From the account in the document, it is clear that the protagonists are Afro-Descendants, and are portrayed as ridiculous figures in scandalous clothing.

== Production ==
It is estimated that the document was put into circulation between 1825 and 1835, shortly after Peruvian War of Independence was achieved, because the information preserved in the original is the record of the printing press where it was produced, the JM Concha Republican Printing Press.
