= John Day =

John Day, John Daye or Jon Day may refer to:

== People ==
=== Politicians ===
- John Day (Arkansas politician), state legislator
- John Day (Nova Scotia legislator) (died 1775), merchant and politician in Nova Scotia
- John Day Jr. (died 1792), soldier and political figure in Nova Scotia
- John Day (Liberian judge) (1797–1859), Liberian politician and judge
- John Charles Day (1826–1908), English judge
- John Adam Day (1901–1966), politician in Devon, England
- John Day (Indiana politician) (born 1937), Democratic member of the Indiana House of Representatives
- John Day (Australian politician) (born 1955), Western Australian politician
- John Day, Transport Workers Union of America Local 100 Vice President

=== Sportspeople ===
- John Barham Day (1793–1860), English jockey and trainer
- John Day (cricketer, born 1812), English cricketer
- John Day (horseman) (1819–1883), English jockey and trainer
- John B. Day (1847–1925), manager of the New York Giants in 1899
- John Day (jockey) (1856–1885) Australian champion pedestrian and 1870 Melbourne Cup winner
- John Day (cricketer, born 1881) (1881–1949), English cricketer

=== Other people ===
- John Day (merchant) (fl. 1497–98), English merchant, author of a letter referring to existence of lost book Inventio Fortunata
- John Day (printer) (c. 1522–1584), English Protestant printer, also known as John Daye
- John Day (dramatist) (1574–c. 1638), English dramatist
- John Day (carpenter) (c. 1740–1774), first recorded death in a submarine
- John Day (trapper) (c. 1770–1820), American hunter and trapper
- John Day (architect) (fl. 1798–1802), Irish architect from County Wexford
- John Day (priest) (1802–1879), clergyman in the Church of Ireland
- John Day (botanist) (1824–1888), English orchid collector and illustrator
- John Medway Day (1838–1905), Australian journalist and activist
- John Other Day (fl. 1862–1912), Native American who sought peace between Indian tribes and white settlers
- John H. Day (1909–1989), South African marine biologist and invertebrate zoologist
- John A. Day (1913–2008), American meteorologist, educator and sky-watching evangelist
- John Day (historian) (1924–2003), American historian
- John E. Day Jr. (1929–1959), American war criminal
- John Day (computer scientist) (born 1947), ARPANET pioneer and early RFC contributor
- John Day (RAF officer) (1947–2024), British air marshal
- Johnny Daye (1948–2017), American soul music singer
- John Day (biblical scholar) (born 1948), professor of Old Testament Studies
- Jon Day (born 1954), British civil servant
- Jon Day (born 1962), member of The Charlatans
- Jon Day (writer) (fl. 2010s), British writer, critic and academic

== Places ==
- John Day, Oregon, a city
- John Day River, a tributary of the Columbia River in northeastern Oregon
- John Day River (northwestern Oregon), a different tributary of the Columbia River

== Other uses ==
- John Day (film), a 2013 Indian film
- John Day Company, a New York publisher founded in 1926

== See also ==
- John Day Dam, a dam on the Columbia River
- John Day Fossil Beds National Monument
