= Saint John's Eve =

Evening of June 24, celebration

St. John's Eve Eve of the Feast of Saint John the Baptist
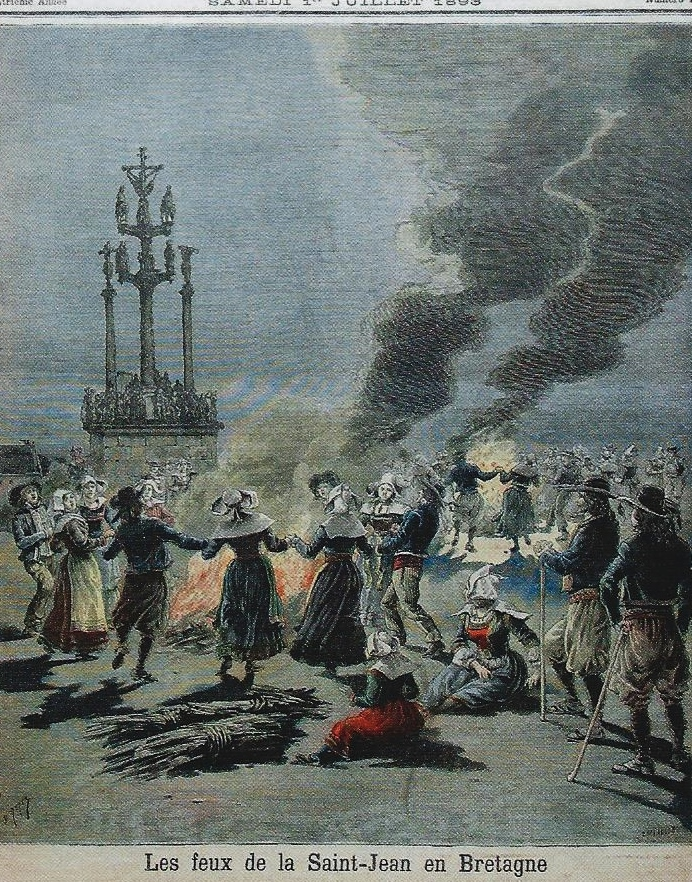
- Saint John's Fire with festivities in front of a Christian calvary shrine in Brittany, 1893
- Official name: Saint John's Eve
- Also called: Eve of the Feast of Saint John the Baptist
- Observed by: Roman Catholic Church; Lutheran Churches; Anglican Communion
- Type: Christian, Cultural
- Significance: The eve of Saint John's Day, which celebrates the Nativity of Saint John the Baptist
- Celebrations: Fireworks, Saint John's bonfires, visiting streams and rivers, watching theatrical dramas related to the life of Saint John the Baptist, and family gatherings
- Observances: Church services, processions, collecting special plants (e.g. Saint John's wort) and having them blessed by a priest/minister
- Ends: 24 June
- Date: 23 June
- Next time: 23 June 2027
- Frequency: Annual
- Related to: Nativity of Saint John the Baptist

Saint John's Eve, starting at sunset on 24 June, is the eve of the feast day of Saint John the Baptist. It is one of only two feast days marking a saint's earthly birth (the other being the nativity of the Blessed Virgin Mary on 8 September); all other saint's days mark their deaths (dies natalis, their "birth" into Heaven), or some other important event. The Gospel of Luke (Luke 1:26–37, 56–57) states that John was born six months before Jesus; thus, the feast of John the Baptist's birth was fixed on 24 June, six months before Christmas. In the Roman calendar, 24 June was the date of the summer solstice, and Saint John's Eve is closely associated with Midsummer festivities in Europe. Traditions are similar to those of May Day, and include bonfires (Saint John's fires), feasting, processions, church services, and gathering wild plants.

== History ==
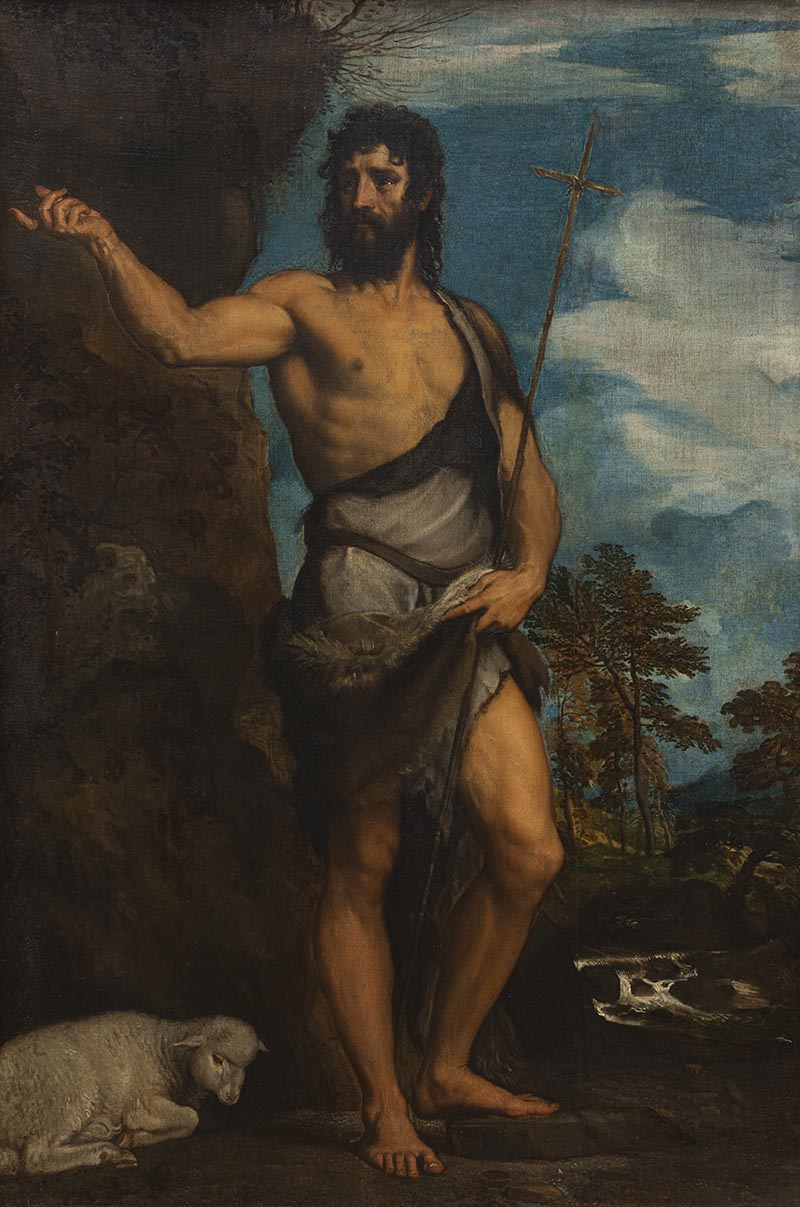
St John the Baptist by Titian

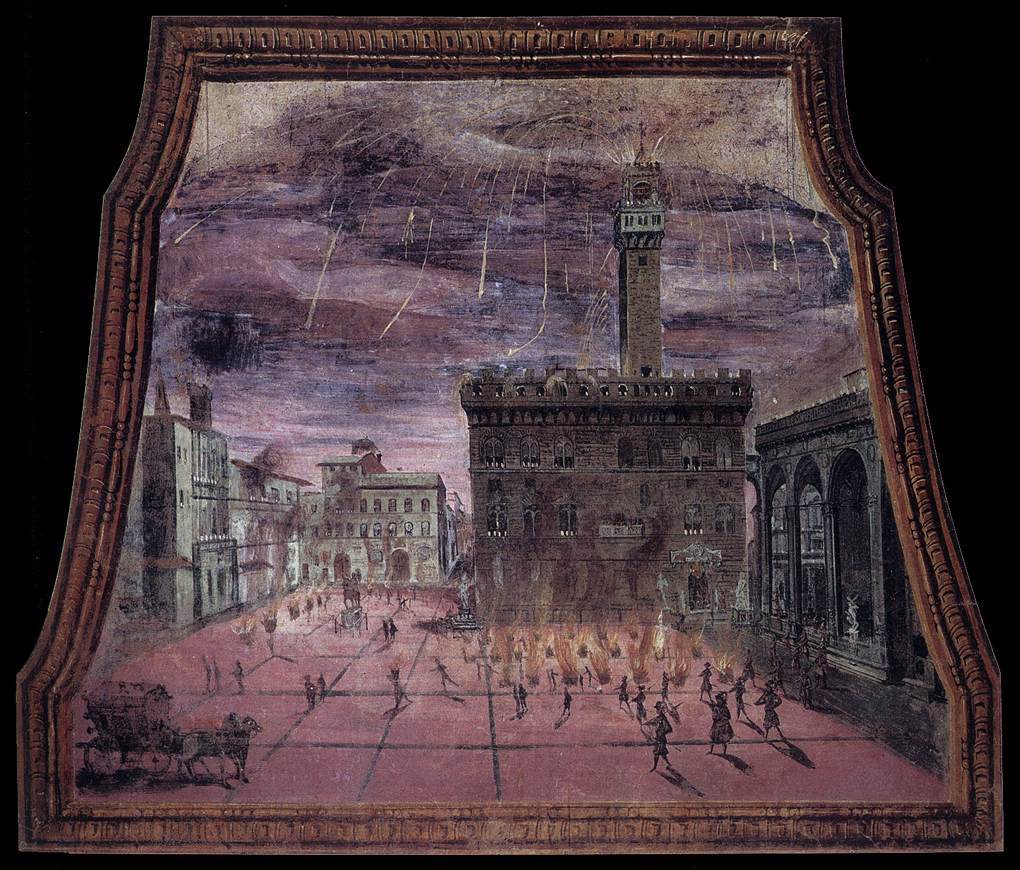
17th century A.D. Saint John's Eve festivities at the Piazza della Signoria.

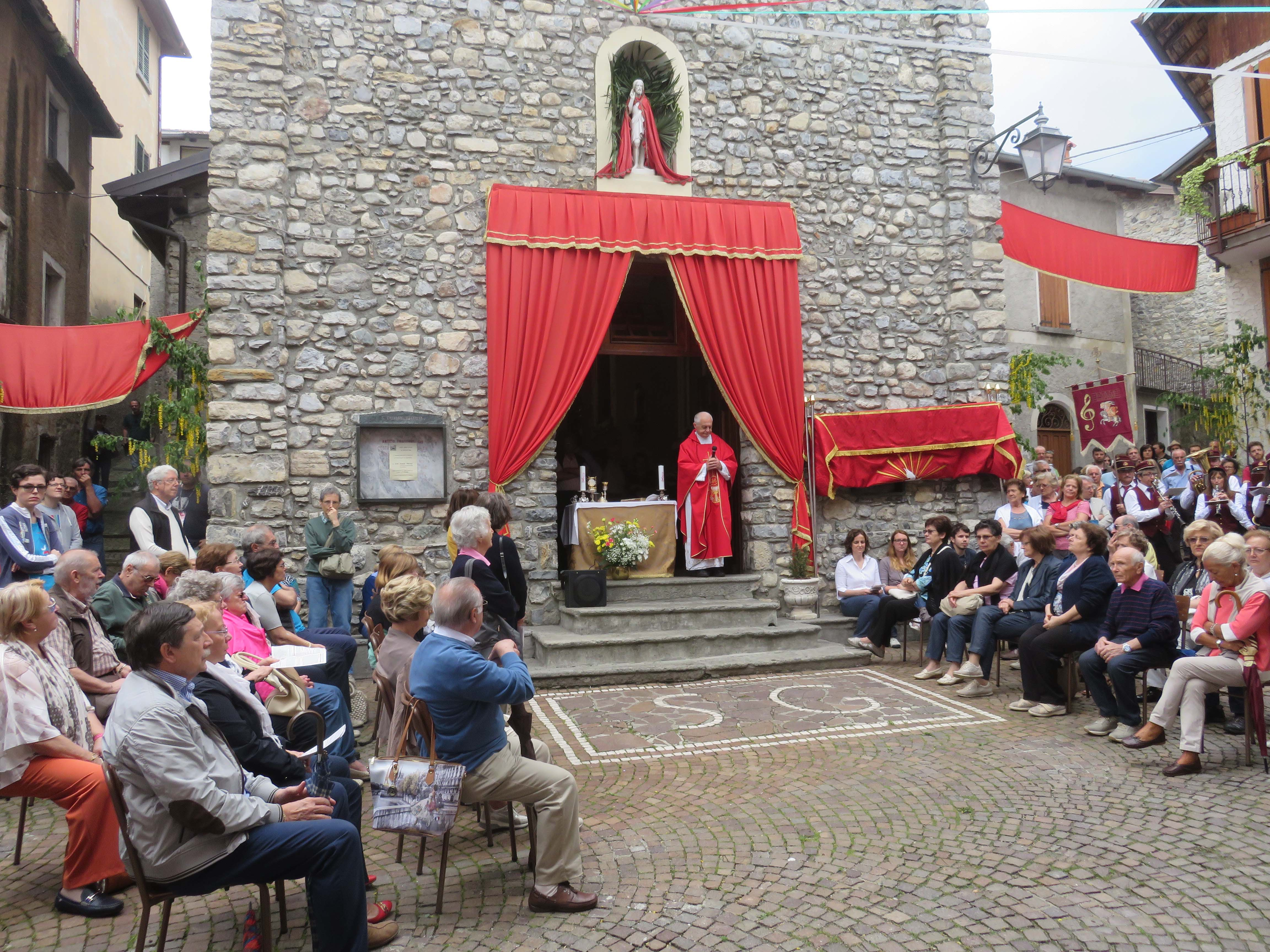
People prepare for a Saint John's Day procession and church service in the comune of Esino Lario, Italy.

Saint John's Day, the feast day of Saint John the Baptist, was established by the undivided Christian Church in the 4th century A.D., in honour of the birth of Saint John the Baptist, which the Christian Bible records as being six months before Jesus. As the Western Christian churches mark the birth of Jesus on 25 December (Christmas), the feast marking the birth of Saint John (Saint John's Day) was set six months before.

In the ancient Roman world, 24 June was the traditional date of the summer solstice and 25 December the date of the winter solstice, both of which were marked by festivals.

Christ's Incarnation was closely tied to the 'growing days' (diebus crescentibus) of the solar cycle around which the Roman year was based. By the sixth century, this solar cycle was completed by balancing Christ's conception and birth against the conception and birth of his cousin, John the Baptist. Such a relationship between Christ and his cousin was amply justified by the imagery of scripture. The Baptist was conceived six months before Christ (Luke 1:76); he was not himself the light, but was to give testimony concerning the light (John 1:8–9). Thus John's conception was celebrated on the eighth kalends of October (24 September: near the autumn equinox) and his birth on the eighth kalends of July (24 June: near the Summer solstice). If Christ's conception and birth took place on the 'growing days', it was fitting that John the Baptist's should take place on the 'lessening days' (diebus decrescentibus), for the Baptist himself had proclaimed that 'he must increase; but I must decrease' (John 3:30). By the late sixth century, the Nativity of John the Baptist (24 June) had become an important feast, counterbalancing at midsummer the midwinter feast of Christmas.

— Professor Éamonn Ó Carragáin, University College Cork

Within Christian theology, John the Baptist "was understood to be preparing the way for Jesus", with John 3:30 stating "He must increase, but I must decrease"; this is symbolized in the fact that the sun's height in the sky and length of the day "begins to diminish" after the summer solstice and begins to increase after the winter solstice. By the 6th century A.D., several churches were dedicated to Saint John the Baptist and a vigil, Saint John's Eve, was added to the feast day. Christian priests held three Masses for the celebration.

The historian Ronald Hutton states that the "lighting of festive fires upon St. John's Eve is first recorded as a popular custom by Jean Belethus, a theologian at the University of Paris, in the early twelfth century", but is undoubtedly much older. In England, the earliest reference to this custom occurs on in the 13th century A.D., in the Liber Memorandum of the parish church at Barnwell in the Nene Valley, which stated that parish youth would gather on the day to light fires, sing songs and play games.

In the 16th century A.D., the English historian John Stow, described the celebration of Saint John's Day:

the wealthier sort also before their doors near to the said bonfires would set out tables on the vigils furnished with sweet bread and good drink, and on the festival days with meats and drinks plentifully, whereunto they would invite their neighbours and passengers also to sit, and to be merry with them in great familiarity, praising God for his benefits bestowed on them. These were called bonfires as well of good amity amongst neighbours that, being before at controversy, were there by the labour of others reconciled, and made of bitter enemies, loving friends, as also for the virtue that a great fire hat to purge the infection of the air. On the vigil of St John Baptist and St Peter and Paul the Apostles, every man's door being shadowed with green birch, long fennel, St John's Wort, Orpin, white lillies and such like, garnished upon with garlands of beautiful flowers, had also lamps of glass, with oil burinin in them all night, some hung branches of iron curiously wrought, containing hundreds of lamps lit at once, which made goodly show.

== Widespread customs ==
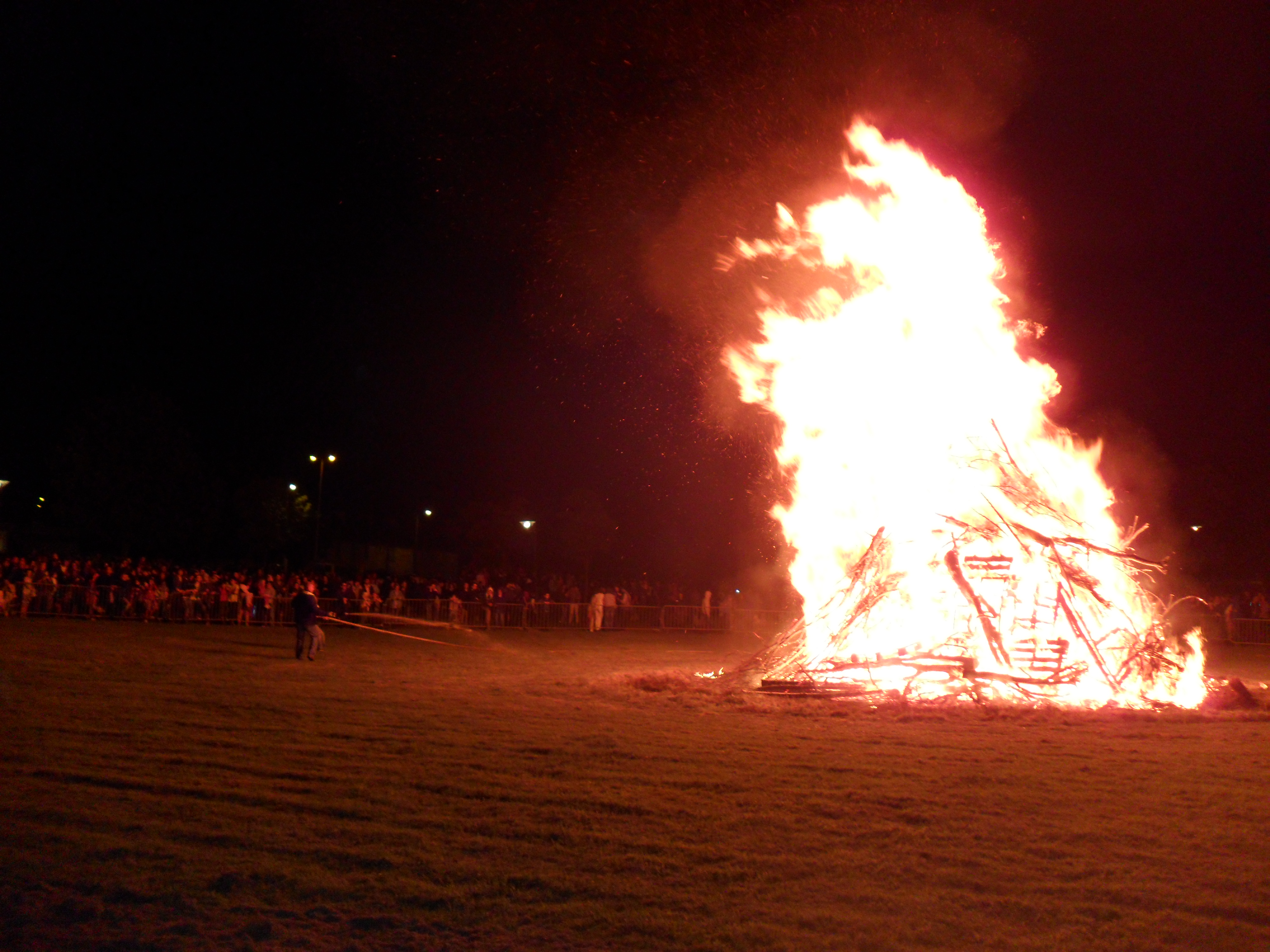
Fire of St John's Eve in Quimper.

Fire is the most typical element associated with Saint John's Eve celebrations. Bonfires (commonly called Saint John's Fires in various languages) were lit in honour of St. John on Saint John's Eve and Saint John's Day, and served to repel witches and evil spirits. A Christian interpretation of carrying lighted torches on St John's Eve is that they are "an emblem of St. John the Baptist, who was 'a burning and shining light,' and the preparer of the way of Christ". These traditions are very similar to those of May Day.

Saint John's Day is also a popular day for infant baptisms and in the 19th century, "baptisms of children who had died 'pagans' were acted out". In Sweden, young people visited holy springs as "a reminder of how John the Baptist baptised Christ in the River Jordan." On Saint John's Eve in Switzerland, goatsbeard and masterwort were fashioned into a cross and then were taken to one's local church, where they were blessed by a Christian priest.

Today, common Saint John's Eve and Saint John's Day traditions include processions, church services, Saint John's bonfires, fireworks, and feasting.

== Night on Bald Mountain ==
Modest Mussorgsky's composition Night on Bald Mountain was originally titled St. John's Night on the Bare Mountain, based on the story "St. John's Eve" by Nikolai Gogol. The first version appeared in 1867 and was revised around 1872 and again in 1880. In this last version he added a hauntingly beautiful quiet ending; in which a church bell announces the dawn, and daybreak chases away the evil spirit. Night on Bald Mountain is in the soundtrack of Walt Disney's movie Fantasia.

== By country ==
=== Brazil ===
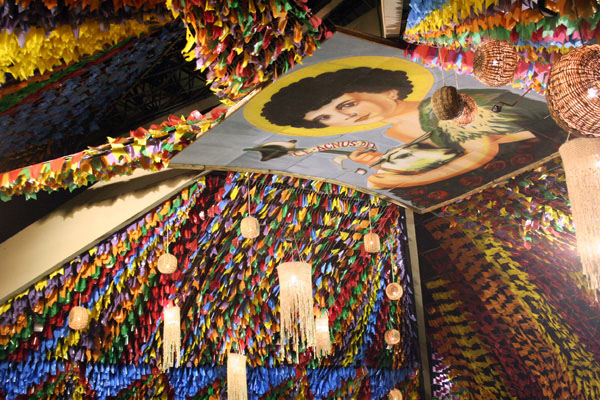
Saint John Festival in Campina Grande, Paraíba, Brazil.

Festas Juninas (June Festivals, "festivities that occur in the month of June"), also known as festas de São João, are the annual Brazilian celebrations adapted from European Midsummer that take place in the southern midwinter. These festivities, which were introduced by the Portuguese during the colonial period (1500–1822), are celebrated during the month of June nationwide. The festival is mainly celebrated on the eves of the Catholic solemnities of Saint Anthony, Saint John the Baptist, and Saint Peter. In many cities in the interior of the country these festivals attract millions of tourists and have a significant impact in the local economy.

=== Canada ===
In Quebec, Canada, the celebration of St John's Day was brought to New France by the first French colonists. Great fires were lit at night. According to the Jesuit Relations, the first celebrations of St John's Day in New France took place around 1638 on the banks of the Saint Lawrence River on the evening of June 23, 1636 with a bonfire and five cannon shots. In 1908, Pope Pius X designated John the Baptist as the patron saint of the French-Canadians.

=== Croatia ===
Croats celebrate Ivanjski krijesovi, also called Ivanjdan or Svitnjak in West Herzegovina and coastal Croatia, is celebrated on June 23 in Croatia. People light large bonfires in honor of Saint John Baptist; the celebration can also be connected to the old Slavic traditions for Kresnik (South Slavic version of Perun), the god of Sun. The locals bring firewood to a designated place and light a bonfire at sunset; young people attempt to jump over as it burns. Rivalries between villages on who makes the bigger bonfire is common, leading to competitions between village folk.

=== Denmark ===
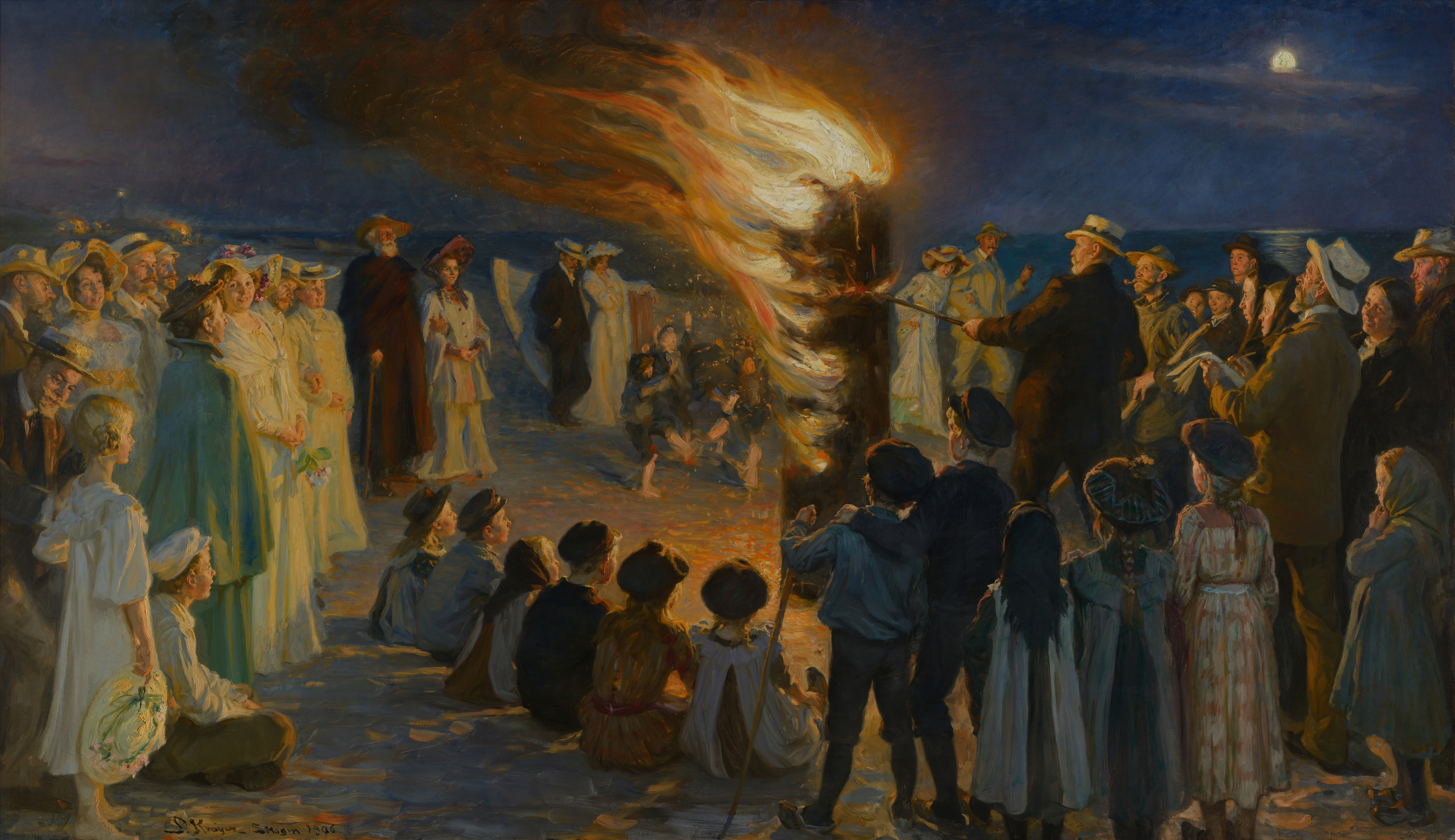
Midsummer Eve Bonfire on Skagen Beach (1906), an artistic depiction of the traditional Danish bonfire.

Saint John's Eve (Sankthansaften) is celebrated in the same manner in Denmark as the Walpurgis Night is in Sweden. At dusk large bonfires are lit all over the country, typically accompanied by communal singing of Midsommervisen by Holger Drachmann. Atop each bonfire often an effigy of a witch is placed (harking back to the days of witch trials, when real women were burned at the stake). Traditionally, the bonfires were lit to fend off witches, but today - when the witch effigy catches fire - she is said to be "flying away to Brocken" (Danish: "Bloksbjerg"), which can be interpreted as helping the witch on her way. On Saint John's Eve and Saint John's Day, churches arrange Saint John's services and family reunions also occur, which are an occasion for drinking and eating.

=== England ===
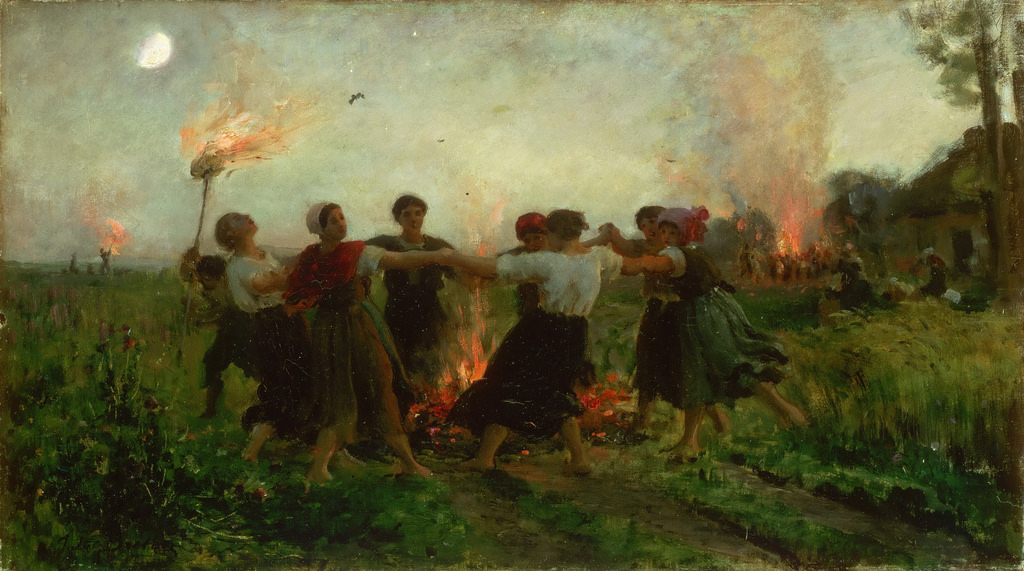
The Feast of Saint John, by Jules Breton (1875).

The feast of St. John the Baptist is one of the quarter days in England. A Christian monk of Lilleshall Abbey, in the 15th century, wrote:

In the worship of St John, men waken at even, and maken three manner of fires: one is clean bones and no wood, and is called a bonfire; another is of clean wood and no bones, and is called a wakefire, for men sitteth and wake by it; the third is made of bones and wood, and is called St John's Fire.

The town of Midsomer Norton, in Somerset, England, is sometimes said to be named after the Feast Day of St John the Baptist, which is also the dedication of the parish church. Wynkyn de Worde (d. 1534) cooked a special soup for the occasion in the manner of his ancestors.

It was the custom in Yorkshire for every family who had come to live in the parish within the last year to put a table outside their house, on St. John's Eve, and place on it bread and cheese and beer and offer this to anyone who passed by. Any of the parish might help themselves and, if the fortunes of the family ran to it, would be invited indoors for a further supper and a festive evening. By this means the newcomers to the parish made many acquaintances and friends, and were helped to see themselves as having a definite place in the local community.

The festival of Golowan in Penzance, Cornwall was created in 1991 to revive the celebration of the Feast of St John. Today it is marked by a torchlit procession, but in the 19th century and earlier the town was the scene of bonfires, burning tar barrels, and homemade fireworks on the principal streets.

=== Estonia ===
Estonians celebrate the eve of the St John (June 23) with bonfires. On the islands of Saaremaa and Hiiumaa, old fishing boats may be burnt in the large pyres set ablaze. Young lovers wander through the forest looking for a lucky fern flower that is said to bloom on only this night. Estonians all around the country will gather with their families, or at larger events to celebrate with singing and dancing. The celebrations carry on usually through the night, they are the largest and most important of the year, and the traditions are almost identical to Finland and similar to neighbours Latvia and Sweden.

=== France ===
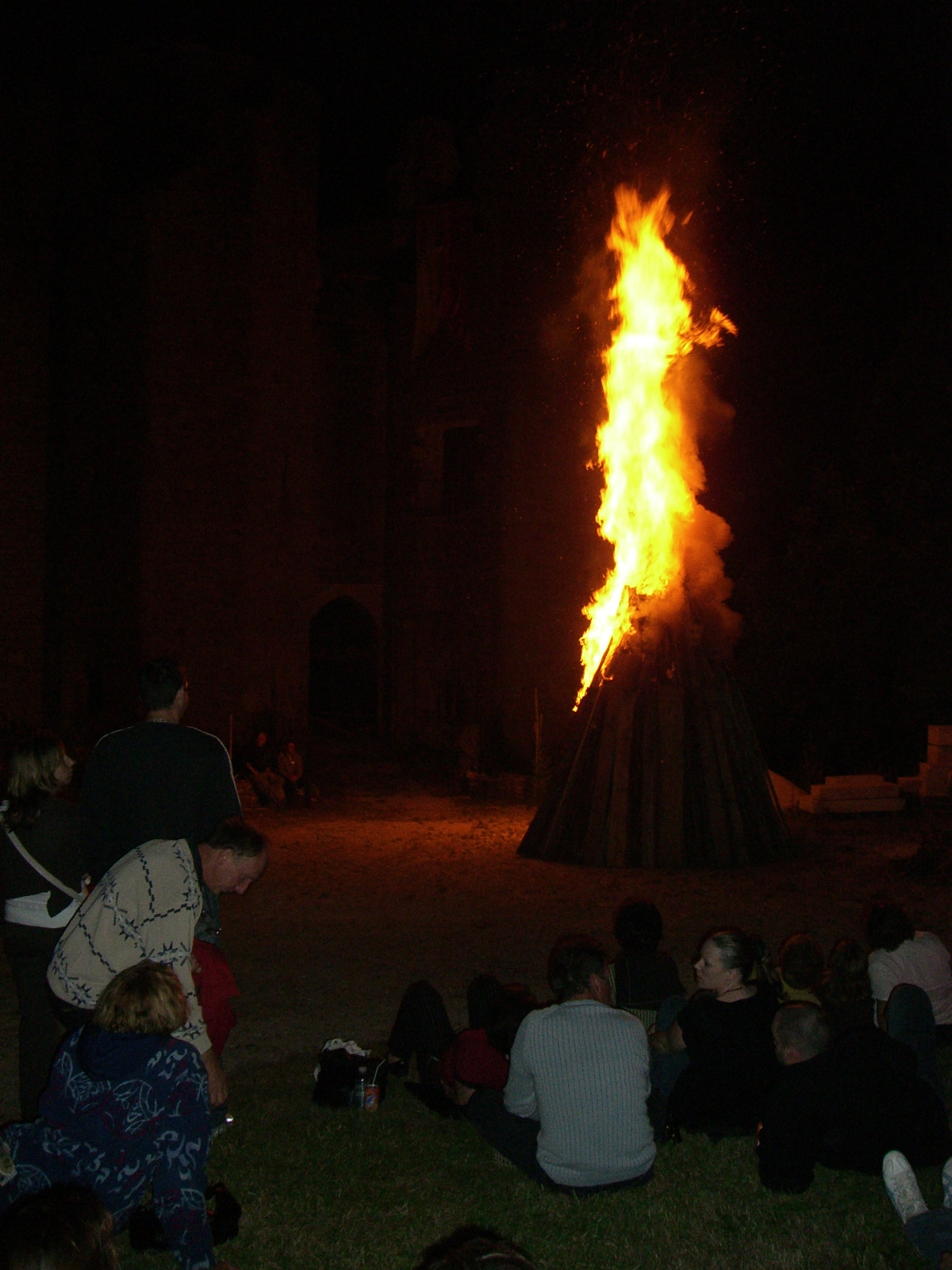
St. John's Eve is typically celebrated with a bonfire called Saint John's Fire, as at the Château de Montfort (Cote-d'Or), France.

In France, the "Fête de la Saint-Jean" (feast of St John), traditionally celebrated with bonfires (le feu de la Saint-Jean) that are reminiscent of Midsummer's pagan rituals, is a Catholic festivity in celebration of Saint John the Baptist. It takes place on June 24, (St John's day). Nowadays it is seldom celebrated. In certain French towns, a tall bonfire is built by the inhabitants in order to be lit on St John's Day. In the Vosges region and in the Southern part of Meurthe-et-Moselle, this huge bonfire is named "chavande".

=== Germany ===
Germany sees a number of Midsummernight festivals around "Johannistag" (St. John's Day, 24 June).

=== Greece ===
The eve of St John's feast is associated with bonfire jumping, the love/ marriage divination ritual of Klidonas and with picking wild oregano before dawn. St John is also known by the epithets Riganas (the oregano bearer) and Lampadiaris (the bonfire bearer). The practice of bonfires was widespread as late as the 1970s but nowadays survives as a revived folk performance.

=== Hungary ===
On June 21 Hungarians celebrate "Saint Ivan's Night" (Szentiván-éj) (derived from the Slavic form of John, translated as Jovános, Ivános, Iván in Hungarian). The whole month of June was once called Month of St. Ivan until the 19th century. Setting fires is a folklore tradition this night. Girls jumped over it, while boys watched the spectacle. Most significant among the customs of the summer is lighting the fire of Midsummer Night (szentiváni tűzgyújtás) on the day of St. John (June 24), when the sun follows the highest course, when the nights are the shortest and the days the longest. In the Middle Ages it was primarily an ecclesiastical festivity, but from the 16th century on the sources recall it as a folk custom.

=== Ireland ===
In some rural parts of Ireland, particularly in the north-west, Bonfire Night is held on St. John's Eve (Irish: Oíche Fhéile Eoin), when bonfires are lit on hilltops. The celebration is also called a "Tine Cnámh", literally Bone Fire. Often lit by the oldest present, the youngest present would throw in a bone as part of the celebrations. As part of some customs after the dancing and celebrations were over, revellers would bring home a spent ember from the fire, this was thrown into a field to bring good fortune in the year to come.

In his poem "The Sisters," published in 1861, Limerick poet Aubrey Thomas de Vere describes "Bonfire Night" or "St. John's Day Eve" in a post-Great-Famine world that still lay in ruins:

At last,
After our home attain'd, we turn'd, and lo!
With festal fires the hills were lit! Thine eve
Saint John, had come once more, and for thy sake
As though but yesterday thy crown were worn,
Amid their ruinous realm uncomforted
The Irish people triumph'd. Gloomy lay
The intermediate space; — thence brightlier burn'd
The circling fires beyond it. 'Lo!' Said I,
Man's life as view'd by Ireland's sons; a vale
With many a pitfall throng'd, and shade, and briar,
Yet overblown by angel-haunted airs,
And by the Light Eternal girdled round.

Irish St. John's Day Eve traditions included: A few days before, children and youth would solicit donations for the bonfires – it was considered bad luck to refuse them. The point of the bonfires was to draw God's blessings on the summer crops. Attendees would leap over the bonfires. Bonfire ashes would be scattered on the crops for good luck. Most troublesome local weeds would be burned in the bonfire to help stave them off. Men would walk through their fields with lit torches and then toss those torches on the bonfire for crop blessing.

People gathering at the bonfires would bring food and drink, with potatoes roasted around the fire. Cattle would be driven through the ashes of the bonfires. At this time of year, St John's Wort and foxgloves would be gathered; the wort was believed to ward off witchcraft and both were used medicinally.

In coastal areas of Ireland, fishermen's boats and nets would be blessed by priests on St John's Eve. A communal salmon dinner was traditionally served on this day in Portballintrae, County Antrim. The sweet milky dish goody was also served, which sometimes would be prepared at the bonfire in a large pot to be served to younger people.

Ballaghkeen, a village in County Wexford, where the church is dedicated to St John the Baptist, holds its Patron day on the first Sunday in July, this Sunday being the closest to the Old Calendar date for St John's Day. In some parts of Ireland, bonfires were lit on the Eve of Saints Peter and Paul (June 28) instead of St John's Eve. The tradition was known as "Little St John's Day".

=== Italy ===
The feast of Saint John the Baptist has been celebrated in Florence from medieval times, with festivals sometimes lasting three days from 21 to 24 June. In medieval Florence, St John's Day was "an occasion for dramatic representations of the Baptist's life and death" and "the feast day was marked by processions, banquets, and plays, culminating in a fireworks show that the entire city attended."

Such celebrations are held nowadays in Cesena from 21 to 24 June also with a special street market. Saint John the Baptist is the patron saint of Genoa, Florence and Turin where a fireworks display takes place during the celebration on the river. In Turin Saint John's cult is also well-established since medieval times when the city stops work for two days and people from the surrounding areas gather to dance around the bonfire in the central square. In Genoa and coastal Liguria it is traditional to light bonfires on the beaches on Saint John's Eve to remember the fires lit to celebrate the arrival of Saint John's relics to Genoa in 1098. Since 1391 on the 24th of June a great procession across Genoa carries the relics to the harbour, where the Archbishop blesses the city, the sea, and those who work on it.

=== Jersey ===
In Jersey most of the former midsummer customs are largely ignored nowadays. The custom known as Les cônes d'la Saint Jean was observed as late as the 1970s - horns or conch shells were blown. Ringing the bachîn (a large brass preserving pan) at midsummer to frighten away evil spirits survived as a custom on some farms until the 1940s and has been revived as a folk performance in the 21st century.

=== Norway ===
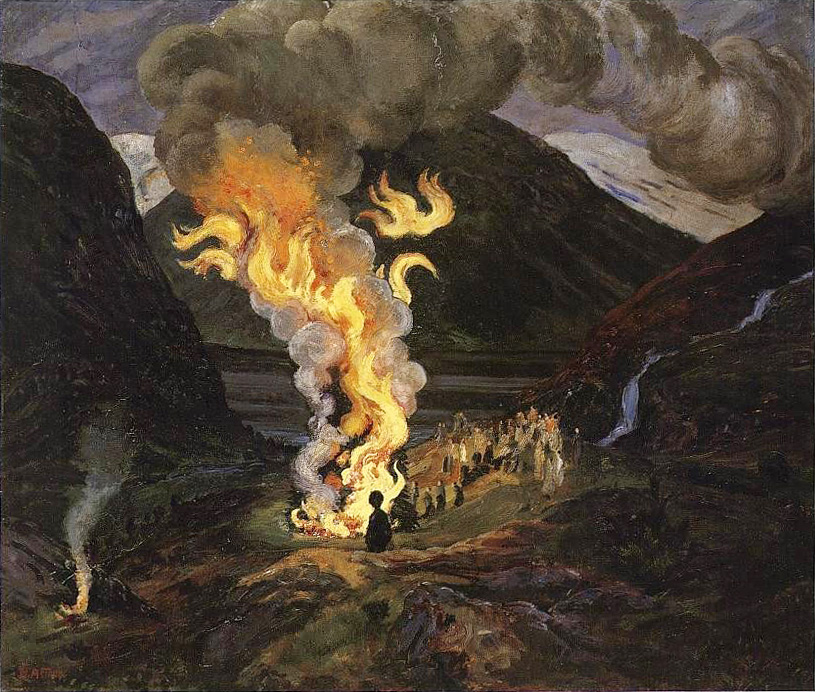
St. John's Fire by Nikolai Astrup, 1912.

In Norway, as elsewhere in Scandinavian countries, this event is celebrated with a communal bonfire. The event is also known as Jonsok, meaning "wake of Saint John".

=== Paraguay ===
The religious festival of San Juan, on June 24, begins the night of the vigil (June 23), with music, songs, dances and games around a large bonfire. An essential element of the festival is fire, an extremely important element for the Guarani culture related to wisdom. Neighbors gather to participate in games and contests that often have traditional Guarani names. The most dangerous of the games is "pelota tata" a rag ball soaked in oil or kerosene. The ball ignites and turns into a ball of fire that circulates among the crowd and is kicked by people to try to scare it away. The "tatá ári jehasa" is also dangerous: It means walking barefoot on a 5-metre (16 ft) bed of coals.

They also play "toro candil", where someone wears a helmet in the shape of a bull's head with flaming horns and runs among the crowd pretending to be a bull. The "yvyra sy'ĩ" (Spanish "árbol resvaloso" English "resplendent tree") is the contest of trying to climb a greased mast, which has some prize hanging from the tip. The "Casamiento Koyguá" (Koyguá Marriage) is a simulated peasant wedding for fun, there is another version that would be the "Casamiento Forzado" (Forced Marriage) where a woman and a man are accused and forced to marry with all the details of a wedding. The "kambuchi jejoká" is a piñata made with a ceramic jar, which has to be broken with a wooden stick while the participant is blindfolded. The festival ends when "el Judas Kai" is lit, a life-size doll filled with explosives and fireworks. Many time it's made to look like a hated or unpopular person in the community.

=== Philippines ===
In the Philippines, the festival is a thanksgiving celebration done through the traditional "basaan" (dousing of water among children and grown-ups) on the streets as a way of sharing Saint John's blessings. Parades, street dance competitions and other activities liven up the annual celebration.

=== Poland ===
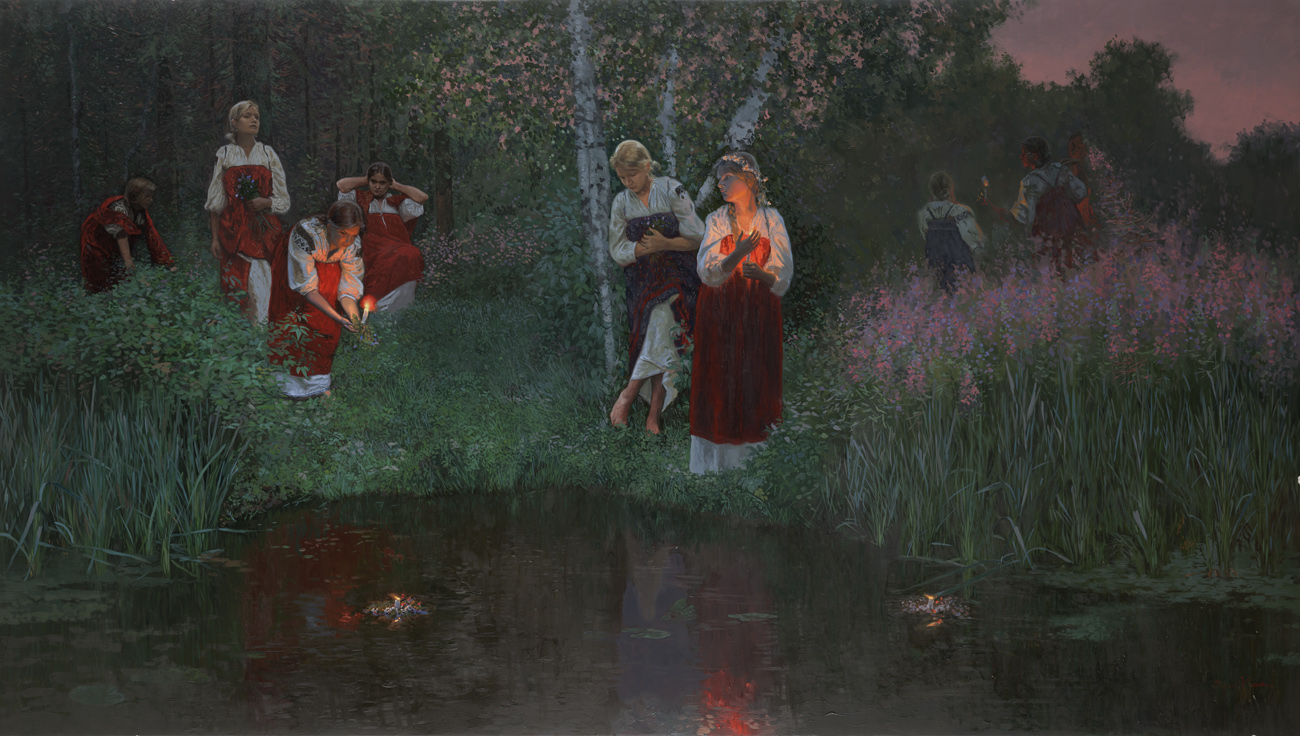
Simon Kozhin. Kupala Night, Divination on the Wreaths (2009).

Conventional Polish celebrations of midsummer are a mix of pagan and Christian influences. In Poland the festival is known as 'noc świętojańska' (Christian) or 'Noc Kupały' (Kupala Night) and 'sobótka' (pagan). Traditional folk rituals include groups of young men and women singing ritual songs to each other. The young women may wear crowns fashioned from wild flowers, which are later thrown into a nearby pond or lake. The boys/young men may then swim out to claim one of the crowns. Bonfires (and bonfire jumping) are also part of the proceedings.

=== Portugal ===
There are St John's street parties in many cities, towns and villages, mainly between the evening on the 23rd and the actual St.John's Day on the 24th of June. St John's night in Porto (Festa de São João do Porto) has been described as "one of Europe's liveliest street festivals, yet it is relatively unknown outside" Portugal. The actual Midsummer, St John's day, is celebrated traditionally more in Porto, Braga, and in the Azores, where it is known as Sanjoaninas and celebrated from the 21st to the 30th of June.

=== Puerto Rico ===
In honor of John the Baptist, a night-long celebration called Noche de San Juan (Saint John's Night) is held in Puerto Rico, which was originally named San Juan Bautista (Saint John Baptist) by Christopher Columbus during his second voyage in 1493. After sunset, Puerto Ricans travel to a beach or any accessible body of water (e.g. river, lake or even bathtub) and, at midnight, plunge backwards into it three, seven, or twelve times. This is done to cleanse the body from bad luck and to gain good luck for the following year. It is also customary to stroll the Old San Juan historic quarter of San Juan, the capital municipality of the archipelago and island that bears the name of the saint.

=== Shetland Isles ===
The Johnsmas Foy festivities in the Shetland Isles, where the people are still proud of their Nordic roots also take place in the week building up to the 23/24 June. Lerwick holds a Midsummer carnival.

=== Spain ===
The traditional midsummer party in Spain is the celebration in honour of Saint John (Spanish: San Juan, Catalan: Sant Joan, Galician: San Xoán) and takes place on the evening of June 23. This midsummer tradition is especially strong in coastal areas of Spain, like in Galicia, where San Xoán festivals take place all over the region; bonfires are lit and a set of firework displays usually takes place. On the Mediterranean coast, especially in Catalonia and the Valencian Community, the celebration includes bonfires too, along very popular dance parties (verbenas), and there are also traditional special foods for the day, such as Coca de Sant Joan. Saint John's Day (June 24) is regarded as the National Day of the Catalan Countries, however, the most relevant celebrations already begin in Saint John's Eve.

Every June 22, a group of hikers from Perpignan (Northern Catalonia, France) take the Flama del Canigó, a fire that remains lit in the Castellet de Perpinyà, and climb to the top of the Canigó mountain, where they light a bonfire. At dawn on June 23, they descend with the renewed Flame, along with many other people gather at the summit to take the flame and thus begin the journey to different locations in the Catalan Countries to make the Flame spread through towns and cities and thus light the Bonfires of Saint John. There is also a large festival in Ciutadella, Menorca, along with many other different cities and towns all across Spain having their own unique traditions associated with the date. In the city of Alicante, the Bonfires of Saint John are the most important local festival, and take place from 20 to 24 June.

Bonfires are also used in the Basque Country to celebrate San Juan Eguna (the feast of St. John the Baptist), which marks the Basque Summer Solstice. In some towns the celebration is supplemented with more festivities and dances.

In Castile and León it is highlighted the Firewalking Festival of San Pedro Manrique (Soria), where barefoot men cross the live coals of a prepared bonfire.

=== Sweden ===
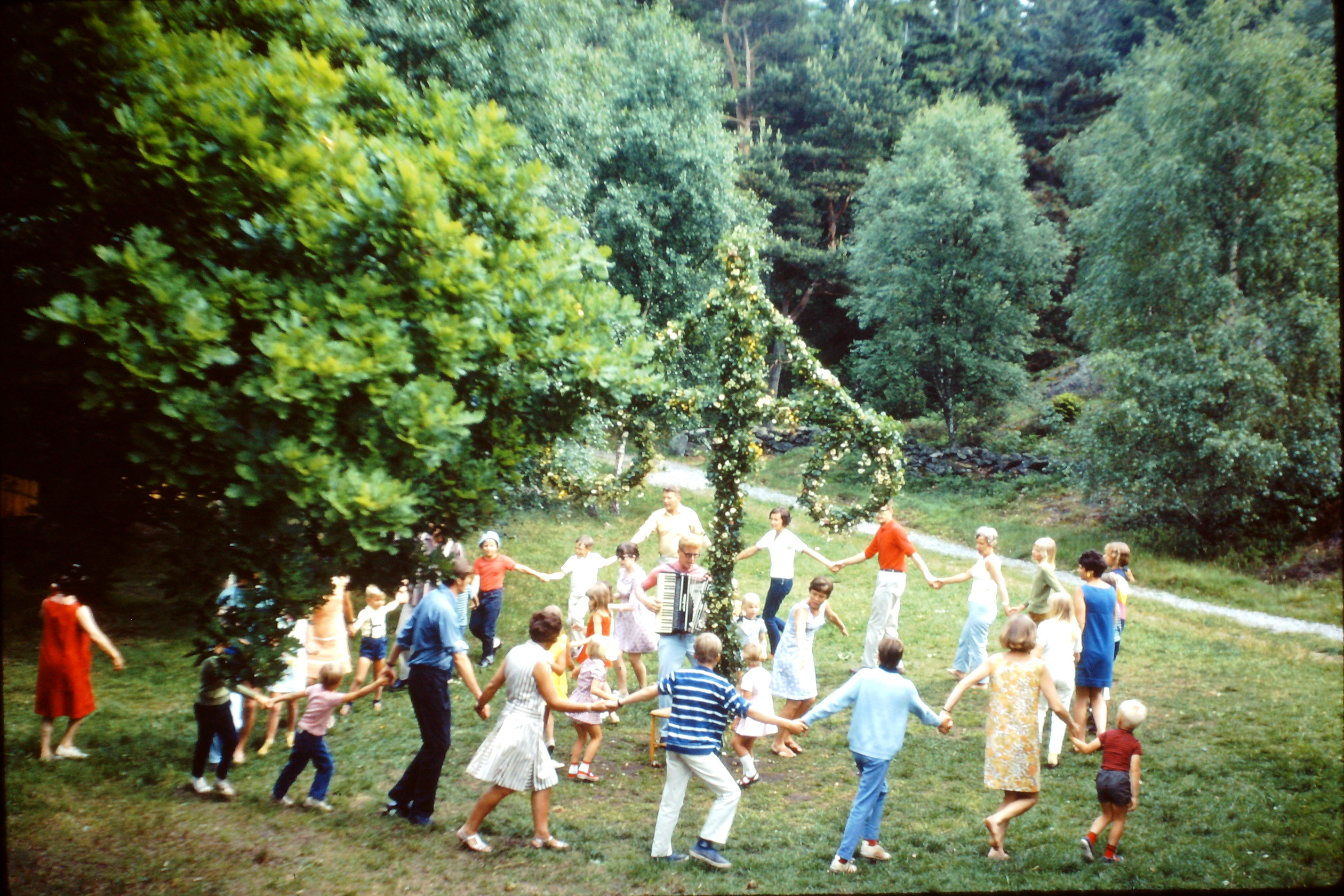
Dancing around the midsummer pole, Årsnäs in Sweden, 1969.

This holiday is normally referred to as 'midsummers eve' or Midsommar in Sweden. Originally a pre-Christian tradition, the holiday has during history been influenced by Christian traditions and the celebration of Saint John, but not as much as to it changing name, as in neighbouring Norway and Denmark. A central symbol nowadays is the 'midsummer pole', a maypole that is risen on the same day as midsummers eve. The pole is a high wooden pole covered in leaves and flowers. Participants dance around the pole and sing songs. Other traditions include eating pickled herring with fresh potatoes, often the first from the seasons harvest, served with sourcream and chives, and often accompanied by drinking snaps. It is the biggest holiday of the year in Sweden besides Christmas, and with Sweden being a part of the vodka belt, getting drunk and feasting all the whole day and night is common.

One Swedish midsummer tradition is that girls should pick seven flowers from seven different fields. The flowers should then be put under the pillow during the midsummer eve night. This night is supposedly magic and the girl is then while sleeping supposed to dream of her future husband.

Another tradition common in Sweden is to make midsummer wreaths of flowers.

=== United States ===
Historically, this date has been venerated in the practice of Louisiana Voodoo. The famous Voodoo priestess Marie Laveau was said to have held ceremonies on the Bayou St. John, in New Orleans, commemorating St John's Eve. Many New Orleans residents still keep the tradition alive.

== See also ==
- Golowan
- Midsummer
- Nativity of St John the Baptist
- St. John's Day
- St. John's Day, Masonic feast
- St. John's Eve, a short story by Gogol
- St Mark's Eve
- True and Untrue
