= John Day (cricketer, born 1881) =

English cricketer

John William Day (15 April 1881 – 9 November 1949) was an English first-class cricketer active 1903–07 who played for Nottinghamshire. He was born in Sutton-on-Trent; died in Saxilby.
