= John A. Day =

John A. Day (May 24, 1913, Salina, Kansas – June 21, 2008, McMinnville, Oregon) was an American meteorologist, educator, and sky-watching evangelist. He charted new Pan American Airways air routes throughout the Asia Pacific region in the era before weather satellites and computer-generated instant data. A photographer of nature and atmospheric phenomenon, he published numerous books, articles, atlases and cloud charts that explained the importance of weather. Popularly known as "The Cloudman" during his decades as both a college professor and lay advocate for cloud appreciation.

== Early life and WWII ==
Day was born on May 24, 1913, in Salina, Kansas, the first child of Lenora (Wilson) and Arthur Cutler Day. He grew up in Colorado Springs, Colorado.

Day graduated from Colorado College in 1936 as a physics/math major. Learning that the Boeing School of Aeronautics in Oakland, California guaranteed its graduates a job in the new field of commercial aviation, he joined Boeing's first class in the emerging field of Aviation Weather Forecasting and then went to work for Pan Am World Airways, helping chart new air routes throughout the Pacific region for the four-engine "California Clipper" flying boats. His assignments took him to Hawaii, New Zealand, Australia, New Caledonia and Japan.

In the early era before weather satellites, Pan Am had to build its own network of weather information and communication facilities using tiny Pacific atolls for bases. Forecasting was often a risky game of guesswork and guts. Day was responsible for providing accurate advance notice of inclement weather such as a rogue hurricane/typhoon or South Pacific cyclone along the 2000-mile over-water routes, ensuring passenger comfort and safety. Even under the best conditions, with plentiful weather information coming in along the routes, this was a demanding job.

When war broke out in 1941, the U.S. Navy took over Pan American Airways and Day became an instant lieutenant j.g. in the USN Transport wing. He took part in several pioneering efforts, including extending flight service to Australia. In 1946, Pan Am sent him from Manila to Tokyo to provide forecasting services for the transport of UNRRA (United Nations Relief and Rehabilitation Administration) personnel from the U.S to China. The chosen route was the previously unflown great circle along the Aleutians to Tokyo through a very weather-active region. Forecasts had to be made from a very sparse network of observing stations in mainland Asia and over the western Pacific Ocean. Today this route is the expressway of flights to the Orient.

== Post-war teaching career ==
In 1946, Day left Pan Am to begin an academic career teaching physics at Oregon State College (OSC). He and fellow professors Fred Decker, Bill Lowry and Russ Lincoln started OSC's new meteorology department.

After earning his Ph.D. in cloud physics from OSC in 1956, he taught at the University of Redlands in California from 1956 to 1958, then returned to Oregon to teach atmospheric sciences at Linfield College in McMinnville. In 1962–63 he received a National Science Foundation Science Faculty Fellowship to study cloud physics at Imperial College of Science and Technology in London, England where he investigated the relationship of bursting water droplets to the production of condensation nuclei. In May 1963 at the International Conference on Cloud Physics in Toulouse, France, he connected with Vincent Schaefer, the discoverer of dry-ice cloud seeding, with whom he would later collaborate on Peterson's Field Guide to the Atmosphere, (published in 1981, and honored for excellence in young science writing by the New York Academy of Sciences in 1982.) Day subsequently published related volume in the introductory series, Peterson's First Guide to Clouds and Weather in 1991. He authored a total of eight meteorological, climate and environmental textbooks starting with Water, the Mirror of Science, (1961, with Kenneth Davis) and most recently in 2002, The Book of Clouds, which featured the best of his photography and easy-to-understand explanations of weather phenomena.

Posthumously, he is listed as coauthor of Peterson's Field Guide to Weather in 2021.

In 1975, Day proposed extending Linfield College's educational mission beyond its campus and established a Division of Continuing Education (DCE)/Adult Degree Program. This partnership with Good Samaritan School of Nursing in Portland provided a means for registered nurses to obtain their BSN (bachelor of science in nursing) degrees. In 1982, the Linfield College/Good Samaritan School of Nursing became a division of Linfield College and the DCE now teaches nearly all of its courses online and enrolls students from all over the world. Though officially retired in 1978, Day continued teaching freshman meteorology as an adjunct professor emeritus until the age of 91. In 2002, Linfield trustees elected him to the Tall Oaks Society in recognition of meritorious service to the college.

== Legacy ==
In the 1970s, acting as "The Cloudman", he wrote a weekly column, "Words on the Weather", for the McMinnville, Oregon News-Register newspaper, that appeared in over 1000 installments from 1978 to 2007. During a 1971 sabbatical in England, he researched the connections between Luke Howard, the 18th-century originator of cloud nomenclature, and J.M.M. Constable, the famous painter of cloudscapes, with the intention of writing a biography of Howard.

He photographed clouds for decades, and his cloud images have been exhibited in public galleries including the Brooks Institute of Photography in Santa Barbara, California and The Hong Kong Science Museum. His pictures served as a basis of the Skywatchers' Cloud Chart, published in conjunction with an educational initiative, For Spacious Skies and was chosen as the official cloud chart for The Weather Channel, the American Meteorological Society and the National Weather Service. He also started several businesses that tapped his vast photo collection: audiovisual cloud slide shows as relaxation therapy for hospital patients; Day Photo, enlarging and framing his pictures for displaying in local institutions; and Quiet Time Art Cards.

After years of lobbying the U.S. Postal Service to feature clouds on their stamps, in 2004 one of his pictures, a cumulus humilis cloud hovering over a local McMinnville red barn, was chosen to be featured in the USPS "Cloudscapes" series. With the advent of the Internet, his evangelism went global. In 1997, he launched the Cloudman.com website where his photographs inspired people all over the world to "Look Up and See the Beauty of the Sky." Day died on June 21, 2008, in McMinnville, Oregon.
