= St. John's Day, Masonic feast =

Two feast days (24 June; 27 December)

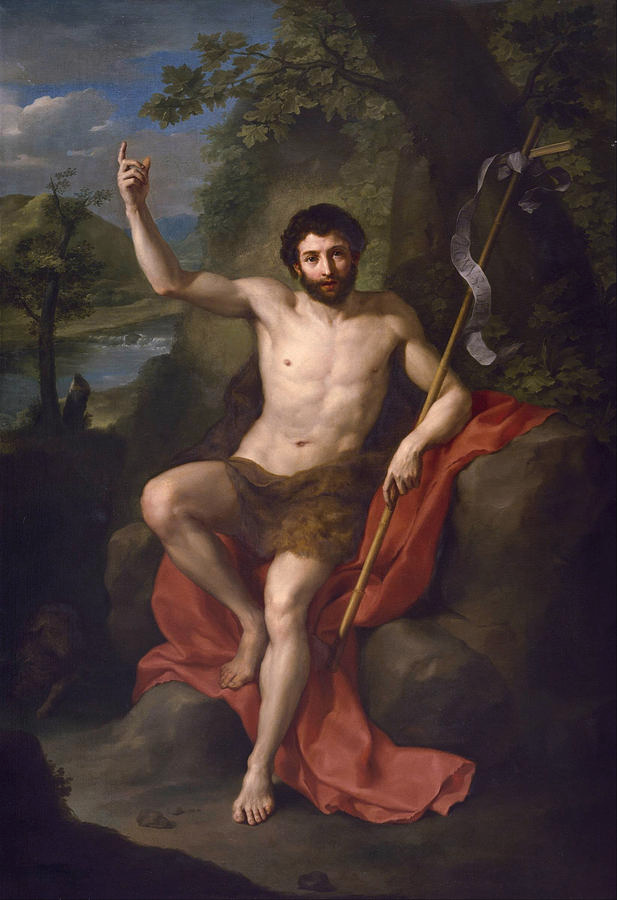
Saint John the Baptist Preaching in the Wilderness by Anton Raphael

Freemasons historically celebrate two feasts of saints who are both named John. The feast of John the Baptist falls on 24 June, and that of John the Evangelist on 27 December, roughly marking mid-summer and mid-winter. During the Eighteenth Century, the Premier Grand Lodge of England and the Grand Lodge of Ireland favoured the day of John the Baptist, while the Grand Lodge of Scotland, the Ancient Grand Lodge of England and the Grand Lodge of All England at York installed their Grand Masters on the feast day of John the Evangelist. The United Grand Lodge of England was formed on 27 December 1813.

== John the Baptist ==
The first Grand Lodge was formed on 24 June the feast day of John the Baptist in 1717. This may arise from an old tradition, as the Baptist appears to have been regarded as the patron of stonemasons in continental Europe during the Middle Ages. The guild of masons and carpenters attached to Cologne Cathedral was known as the Fraternity of St. John the Baptist. The earliest surviving record of Grand Lodge of Ireland installing a Grand Master is dated to 24 June 1725. As records of individual lodges appear in Ireland and in the Antients' in England, it seems many of them met to install a new master twice a year, on the feast days of both the Baptist and the Evangelist.

This date is also a popular day for cornerstone laying ceremonies. The first Masonic Hall in New York City had its cornerstone laid on 24 June 1826.

== John the Evangelist ==
The Evangelist is particularly associated with Scottish lodges. The Lodge of Edinburgh was associated with the aisle of St. John the Evangelist in St. Giles Cathedral from the 15th century. The Grand Lodge of All England, and its predecessor, the Ancient Society of Freemasons in the City of York, elected and installed their president, then from 1725 their Grand Master on the day of the Evangelist, and in London the Ancient Grand Lodge of England elected their new Grand Masters on the same day. When the Ancient and the Moderns (the Premier Grand Lodge) eventually came together in the United Grand Lodge of England, it was on the Feast of the Evangelist in 1813.
