= Freemasonry in Italy =

Freemasonry in Italy (Italian: Massoneria) dates to the first half of the eighteenth century. Its success largely depended on the lack of enthusiasm with which Papal bans on the order were enforced in the various states. After the end of the Napoleonic regime, Freemasonry was suppressed in most of the peninsula. The start of the unification process in 1859 saw a revival in Freemasonry. Giuseppe Garibaldi, a leader of Italian unification, was an active Mason and a keen supporter of the craft. In the 1920s, Freemasonry was again suppressed under Italian fascism but revived again after the fall of Benito Mussolini. In the 1980s the Propaganda Due scandal attracted national attention, damaging Masonry's image. Into the 21st century, Italy contains a wide variety of Masonic observances, regular, liberal, male, female and mixed.

== History ==
=== Origins ===
Italy in 1796

The early history of Freemasonry in the Italian peninsula precedes the unification of the country in 1859–60, and must be dealt with as it occurs in separate states. A minute of 1845 records a lodge called Fidelitas being founded at Girifalco in Calabria in 1723. In spite of the lack of earlier records, this is often cited as the first Masonic Lodge in Italy. Lack of documentation is a major problem in tracing the history of Italian Freemasonry. Many documents were burned by Fascists in the 1920s, often assisted by Freemasons who wished to destroy any record of their own participation.

==== Tuscany ====
Sometime before August 1732, Lord Charles Sackville, then Earl of Middlesex, later the second Duke of Dorset, founded a lodge in Florence which later attracted Italian noblemen and intellectuals. It also attracted the interest of the Inquisition, and its Italian secretary, Tommaso Crudeli, was imprisoned and tortured, later dying as a result. Two lodges were formed in Livorno in 1763 and 1765 under the Antient Grand Lodge of England, and the Premier Grand Lodge of England produced two more in the same city in 1771. Lodges were also formed when French troops were quartered in Livorno in 1796–97, but all were closed by the Grand Duke in 1800. Lodges were again formed in Florence and Livorno in 1807-09 after annexation by France, but the end of French rule in 1814 meant the end of Freemasonry until Tuscany became part of the Italian State in 1859.

==== Rome and the Papal States ====
The Gormogons arrived in Rome before the Freemasons, setting up a lodge in 1724 which may have survived until 1735. The purpose of the lodge may have been the advocacy of Jacobitism. Freemasonry arrived in 1733 in the form of an English-speaking lodge (often called the Jacobite Lodge of Rome) which admitted the exiled George Seton, 5th Earl of Winton. In 1737, the lodge officers were arrested by the Inquisition, and the lodge closed down. Pope Clement XII issued the first papal bull against Freemasonry (In eminenti) the following year, making it illegal in the Papal States. Foreign masons, however, continued to meet in secret, issuing a medal honouring Martin Folkes in 1742. A permanent lodge was established in 1787, but erased by the Inquisition two years later, the same day that Cagliostro was captured. Freemasonry flourished in Rome after the French invasion of 1809, but suppression returned with the Pope in 1814. Although the Grand Orient of Turin managed to establish a lodge in 1861, it was not until 1870 and the incorporation of the Papal States into the Kingdom of Italy that Freemasonry was again permitted.

==== Naples and the Two Sicilies ====
A masonic seal dated to 1728 in Naples appears to belong to a lodge named "Perfect Union", about which nothing else is known. No trace, likewise, can be found of the lodge patented in London in 1731 to be formed in Naples. In 1750, a Neapolitan lodge was established by a Greek, but after the publication, on 28 May 1751, of the Bull Providas Romanorum Pontificum issued by Pope Benedict XIV to reiterate the papal condemnation of 1738, Charles VII of Bourbon (who later became King Charles III of Spain) issued an edict (10 July 1751) that prohibited Freemasonry in the Kingdom of Naples. He changed his mind the next year, entrusting his son's education to a Mason and a priest. In 1764 a national Grand Lodge was established, and Freemasonry seemed firmly established in the Kingdom of the Two Sicilies. However, in 1775 Tannuci, a minister of Ferdinand IV, persuaded him to ban Freemasonry again. Using Agents provocateurs Tannuci induced some masons to meet illegally, which allowed him to make arrests. Queen Caroline then intervened on the mason's behalf, convincing her husband to revoke the edict and dismiss Tannuci. In 1781 the ban was renewed, and its revocation two years later came with such restrictions that Freemasonry in the Two Sicilies died out. Flourishing briefly during the French occupation from 1804 to 1814, the ban was again imposed on their expulsion. Freemasonry in the Two Sicilies had a fitful, clandestine existence, last recorded in Palermo in 1848.

==== Sicily ====
Two Masonic lodges were founded in Sicily: in 1762 the "San Giovanni di Scozia" in Palermo and in 1764 the "Saint Jean d'Ecosse du Secret et de l'Harmonie" in Malta.

==== Genoa and Liguria ====
In Liguria between 1745 and 1749 there were at least two lodges in Bordighera and Genoa, connected with the presence of French troops defending the Republic. Towards the end of the century, two other lodges were formed in Genoa. In 1780 one arose adhering to the Rectified Scottish Rite and another, in 1782, obtained a charter from the Premier Grand Lodge of England as the Old British and Ligurian Lodge. Two came into existence under the Grand Orient of France when Liguria was annexed by Napoleon, but in 1814 the region was given to Sardinia and Freemasonry ceased to exist.

==== Republic of Venice ====
In 1746 a lodge was founded in Venice, which became associated with Giacomo Casanova, Carlo Goldoni, and Francesco Griselini. It survived until 1755 when the intervention of the Inquisition led to the arrest of Casanova and the dissolution of the lodge. New lodges were founded in 1772, with warrants from the Premier Grand Lodge of England, in Venice and Verona, on the initiative of the Secretary of the Senate, Peter Gratarol, which remained active until 1777. The Rite of Strict Observance established a chapter in Padua in 1781, which opened another in Vicenza shortly afterwards. All Freemasonry was suppressed in 1785.

==== Milan and Lombardy ====
The lodge founded in Milan in 1756 was quickly discovered by the Austrian authorities, which led to an edict (6 May 1757), whereby the governor, Francesco III d'Este, Duke of Modena, banned Masonic meetings throughout Lombardy. However, the lodge continued to exist and in 1783 joined the Grand Lodge of Vienna. The following year Earl Wilczeck, minister plenipotentiary imperial Milan, assumed the office of Provincial Grand Master for the Austrian Lombardy. In 1776 a lodge was added in Cremona.

==== Cisalpine Republic ====
In 1797, most of Northern Italy east of Piedmont and north of the Papal States became the Cisalpine Republic. In 1801 it became the Italian Republic and in 1805 the Kingdom of Italy, with Napoleon as King. The Grand Orient of France formed the new state's first lodge in Milan in 1801, and in 1805 Milan also hosted a Supreme Council of the Ancient and Accepted Scottish Rite. The Grand Orient of Naples amalgamated with the new body, and a new Grand Orient was born, recognised by Paris. Freemasonry briefly flourished, until the new state was broken up and Freemasonry was suppressed in 1814.

==== The Kingdom of Sardinia, Savoy and Piedmont ====
During the period when Freemasonry was first established in Italy, Savoy and Piedmont were part of the Kingdom of Sardinia. In 1749 in Chambery, a lodge was founded on the basis of a license from the provincial grand master for Savoy and Piedmont issued by the Grand Lodge of London in 1739 to the Marquis de Bellegarde François Noyel. In 1752, the same lodge took the name of the Mother Grand Lodge, with the power to create other lodges in all the territories of the Kingdom of Sardinia and, in fact, in 1765 three of them were created, including one in Turin. The latter assumed such importance as to be accorded, in 1773, autonomy from the Grand Lodge at Chambery. In Piedmont, a lodge was also present in Novi Ligure. After French domination, the regions were handed back to Sardinia in 1814, and Freemasonry repressed.

=== Re-establishment in the Risorgimento ===
The Risorgimento, or unification of Italy, is generally taken to have commenced with the acquisition of most of Northern Italy by Victor Emmanuel II of Sardinia, and unfolded over several years as diplomacy and Giuseppe Garibaldi's conquests extended the new kingdom. The resurgence of Freemasonry dates from the same year, as a new lodge was formed in Turin, followed by other cities, including Rome. Twenty-two of these lodges met on 26 December 1861 and proclaimed the Grand Orient of Italy on 1 January 1862. The diplomat Costantino Nigra was elected Grand Master, and Garibaldi was named as honorary Past Grand Master. The new Grand Orient only claimed jurisdiction over the three basic degrees of craft masonry. However, four other bodies had already arisen claiming to govern the Ancient and Accepted Scottish rite (of 33 degrees) for their part of Italy. These were at Palermo (where Garibaldi had been elected Grand Master), Naples, Turin and Livorno. Opposition to the Grand Orient centred on Naples, while the Grand Orient refused to recognise any of the Scottish Rite bodies. While the Grand Orient continued to grow, it was only recognised in Belgium and France. In 1863, internal dissension led to all but one of the Grand officers resigning, and their places being taken by Scottish Rite masons. The new arrangement merely led to a re-alignment of the divisions in Italian Freemasonry. Between 1864 and 1867 there were four Grand Bodies in Italy, By 1867 the Grand Orient was based in Florence, and had about 150 lodges. Two Scottish Rite Councils existed in Palermo and one in Milan. Garibaldi personally intervened. His Masonic congress in Naples in 1867 started a process of unification of the grand bodies, which was completed in 1873 when the Supreme Council of Palermo amalgamated with the Grand Orient.

On 21 April 1901, the Grand Orient opened its new headquarters in Palazzo Giustiniani in Rome. A disagreement over secularism in elementary schools led in 1908 to the secession of the Supreme Council of Ancient and Accepted Scottish Rite. The stated reason for dissension was the increasing politicisation of the Grand Orient. On 21 March 1910, this body established the Grand Lodge of Italy, with Protestant pastor Saverio Fera, a former adherent of Garibaldi, as Grand Master. From its headquarters it became known as the Grand Lodge of Piazza del Gesù.

In 1904 the first lodge of Le Droit Humain was installed in Rome by Annie Besant. The subsequent lodges were organized into a Federation in 1916. Le Droit Humain is the oldest Freemasonry for Men and Women in Italy.

In 1914, at the fourteenth national congress of the Italian Socialist Party, held in Ancona, Mussolini managed to impose his motion for the incompatibility between party membership and Freemasonry, winning over that of the freemason Alfredo Poggi who was instead in favor.

=== Repression under Fascism ===
As Benito Mussolini rose to power, many of Italy's Freemasons became ardent fascists, and some helped organise Mussolini's March on Rome. However, in 1923 Freemasonry was declared incompatible with Fascism, and in spite of protestations of loyalty from the Grand Lodge, was banned outright in 1925. General Luigi Capello was expelled from the party in 1923 for refusing to leave his lodge, and the next year was accused of plotting to assassinate Mussolini. He was sentenced to 30 years' imprisonment. In the wake of the verdict, the Grand Master of the Grand Orient and 44 other masons were sent, without trial, into exile in the Lipari Islands. Italian Freemasonry continued in exile, with Italian masons contributing to the Republican cause in the Spanish Civil War. Freemasonry did not return to Italy until the fall of Fascism towards the end of the Second World War.

=== Rebuilding after fascism ===
On 4 December 1943, in the house of Salvatore Farina in Rome, members of the Grand Lodge of Italy reconstituted the Supreme Council of the Scottish Rite, electing Carlo de Cantellis as Sovereign Grand Commander. There followed years of schism and confusion, as different groups attempted to revive their own brand of Freemasonry.

The Grand Orient of Italy was recognised by the United Grand Lodge of England on 13 September 1972 (the recognition was transferred to the Regular Grand Lodge of Italy in 1993, although many other regular Grand Lodges continue to recognise the Grand Orient). In 1973, attempts to unite the Grand Orient and the Grand Lodge failed due to the Grand Lodge's acceptance of female initiation. Nevertheless, 200 lodges of the Grand Lodge transferred their allegiance to the Grand Orient. The Grand Lodge, under Giovanni Ghinazzi, continued in its own tradition and continued to prosper.

=== Propaganda Due ===
A major scandal affecting the Grand Orient arose in the 1980s from the exposure of illegal activity in a lodge called Propaganda Due (P2). The lodge was originally formed in 1877 as Propaganda massonica. Its purpose was to ensure privacy for masons of national importance, both within and outside the organization. Refounded after World War II (hence P2), it was under the direct control of the Grand Master of the Grand Orient until the advent of Licio Gelli. After Gelli's appointment as master in 1975, he was able to gather together in secret at least a thousand prominent individuals, mainly politicians and State administrators, and the publication of his subversive program of socio-political and institutional structure caused one of the worst political scandals in the history of the Italian Republic.

On 31 October 1981, seven months after the discovery of the lists of affiliates of P2, the central court of the Grand Orient of Italy, presided over by the new grandmaster Armando Corona, expelled Gelli to avoid further scandals. They stated that P2 had been suspended in 1976. A Parliamentary Commission of Inquiry, chaired by Tina Anselmi, concluded that the lodge was subversive, and a "criminal organization". The lodge was legally dissolved on 25 January 1982.

The P2 scandal seriously damaged the image of Freemasonry in Italy, damaging all the various Italian Masonic movements, and not just the Grand Orient of Italy, of which P2 was a part. In 1993, in the aftermath of a further judicial inquiry, the so-called Cordova investigation (after the Public Prosecutor of Palmi, Agostino Cordova), the then Grand Master of the Grand Orient of Italy, Giuliano Di Bernardo (it), elected to distance himself from the organisation, founding the Regular Grand Lodge of Italy (it), which immediately gained (and still retains) the recognition of the United Grand Lodge of England.

=== Holidays ===
The feast of Italian Freemasonry is celebrated on 20 September each year, on occasion of the anniversary of the breach of Porta Pia.

== Main masonic obediences ==
- Grande Oriente d'Italia (Grand Orient of Italy)
- Gran Loggia d’Italia (Grand Lodge of Italy; the "Piazza del Gesú" or "Palazzo Vitelleschi" Obedience)
- Regular Grand Lodge of Italy
- Supremo Consiglio d'Italia e San Marino
- Gran Loggia Italiana
- Ordine Massonico Tradizionale Italiano
- Gran Loggia Massonica Femminile d’Italia
- Gran Loggia Nazionale dei Liberi Muratori d'Italia
- Gran Loggia Italiana dei Riti Egizi
- The International Order of Freemasonry for Men and Women, LE DROIT HUMAIN - Italian Federation
