= Judah Leon Templo =

Jewish Dutch scholar and translator

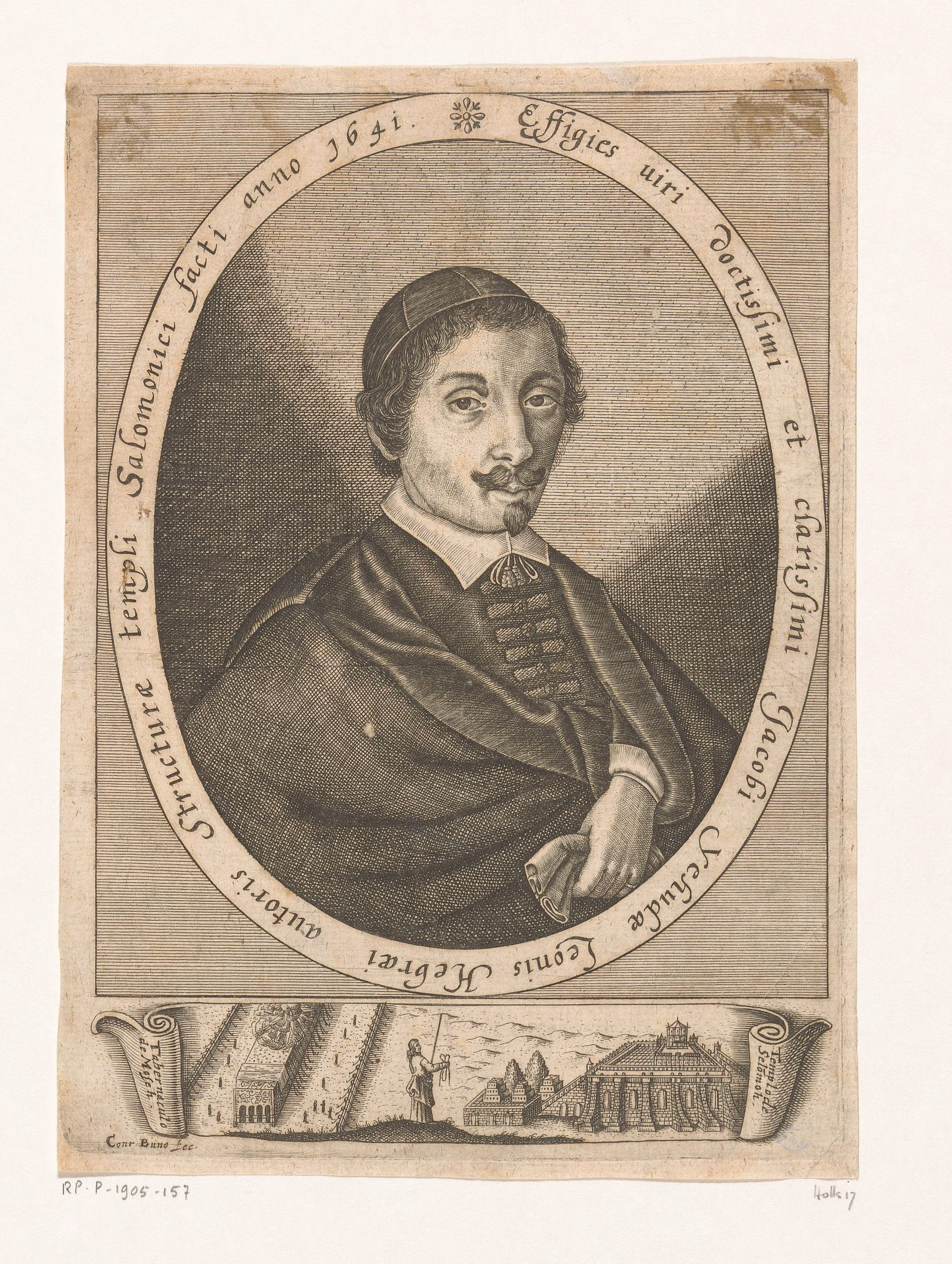
- Jacob Judah Leon, Engraving by Salom Italia, 1641

Personal life
- Born: 1603 Buarcos, Portugal
- Died: after 1675

Religious life
- Religion: Judaism

Jacob Judah Leon Templo (1603 – after 1675) was a Jewish Dutch scholar, translator of the Psalms, and expert on heraldry, of Sephardic descent.

== Biography ==
Jaco Judah Leon was the son of the Portuguese Jews Abraham de Leão and Felipa de Fonseca. He became a ḥakham in Middelburg, Zeeland and, after 1643, practiced in Amsterdam, where he was also a teacher in the Talmud Torah. He vocalized the entire Mishnah, which was printed in 1646 at the establishment of Menasseh Ben Israel, with the anonymous collaboration of Adam Boreel.

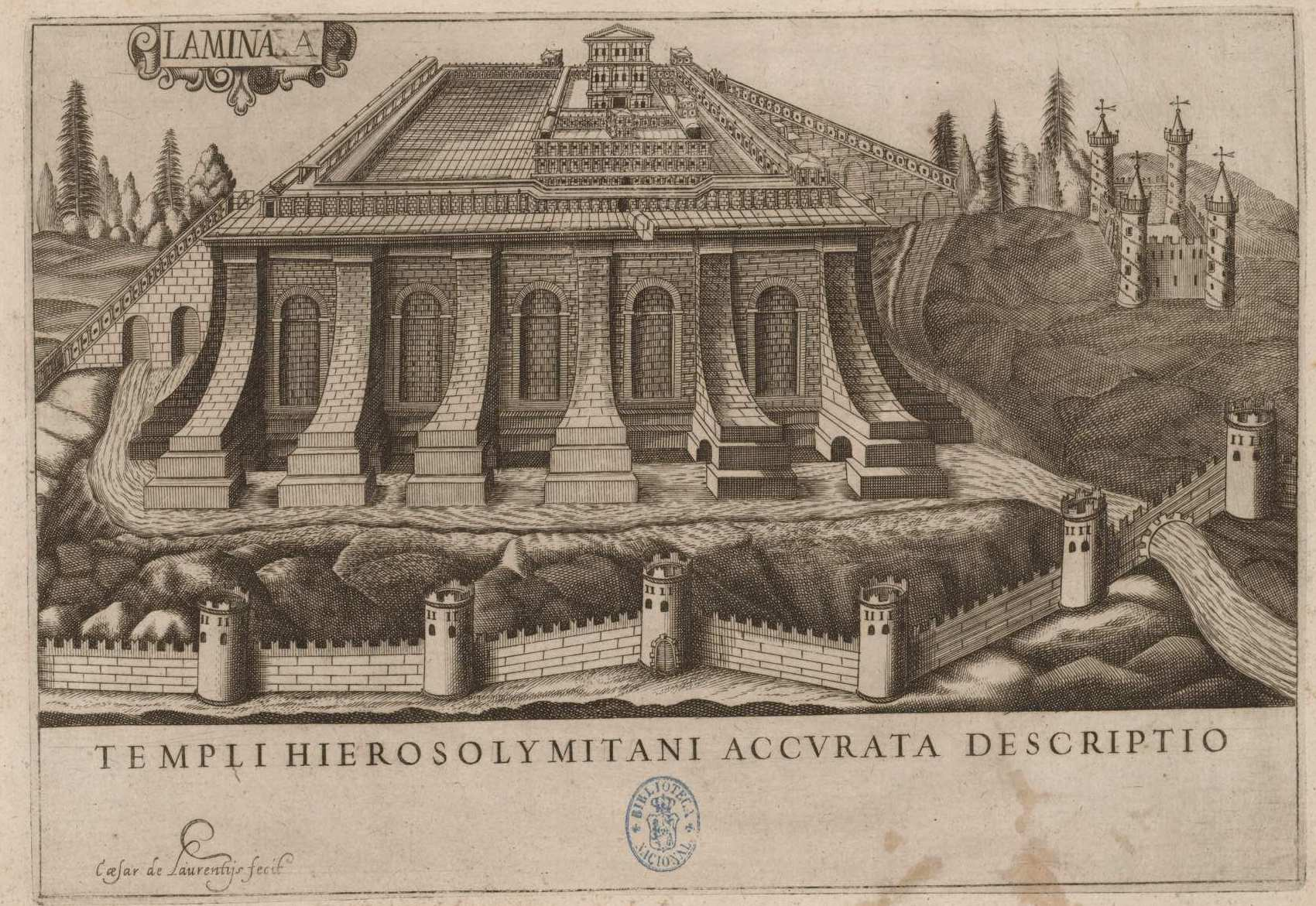
Reconstruction of Solomon's Temple based on Jacob Judah’s description, from Juan Caramuel y Lobkowitz, Architectura civil recta y obliqua, Vol. III. Part I, Plate A.

Jacob caused a great stir with a plan he drew of Solomon's Temple. It was exhibited before Charles II of England. The author published a concise, comprehensive Spanish description entitled Retrato del Templo de Selomoh (Portrait of the Temple of Solomon) in Middelburg in 1642. This was translated into Dutch in the same year, into French in 1643, and by himself into Hebrew in 1650, with the title Tavnith Hekhal. Augustus II, Duke of Brunswick, and more particularly his wife Elizabeth, wished a German translation of this description and entrusted the task to Johann Saubert of Helmstedt. Someone else published such a translation in 1665, and Saubert wrote a Latin translation in that year. An English version appeared in 1778, done by Moses Pereira de Castro, his great-grandson, the son of Isaac Pereira de Castro and Lea DeLeon, the daughter of his son Abraham, and in whose possession the plan was then held.

In 1647 Jacob wrote Tratado de la Arca del Testamento (Amsterdam, 1653). His treatise on the cherubim, their form and nature, written in Latin in 1647, appeared in Spanish under the title Tratado de los Cherubim (Amsterdam, 1654); and his description of Moses' tabernacle, written in 1647 in Dutch, was published under the title Retrato del Tabernaculo de Moseh (Amsterdam, 1654), and in English (1675). His last work was a Spanish paraphrase of the Psalms, which was printed with the text under the title Las Alabanças de Santitad (Amsterdam, 1671) and, as stated in the introduction, was written in seven months. The work was dedicated to Isaac Senior Teixéyra, a financial agent in Hamburg of Queen Christina of Sweden. Many ḥakhamim, scholars, and poets in Hebrew, Latin, and Spanish verses praised it.

Jacob also wrote a dialogue (Colloquium Middelburgense) between a rabbi and a Christian scholar on the value of Christian dogmas, and he left in a manuscript Disputaciones con Diferentes Theologos de la Cristiandad.

He was a skilful draftsman. The coat of arms of the Antient Grand Lodge of England with the motto, now "Holiness to the Lord," is the work of Judah Leon accord to Laurence Dermott, the first Grand Secretary, who in his book Ahiman Rezon attributes it to the "famous and learned Hebrewist, architect, and brother, Rabi Jacob Jehudah Leon." A version of this still exists as the arms of the United Grand Lodge of England and the Grand Lodge of Ireland. Although referred to as a "brother" in the text, Judah preceded the popular rise of freemasonry in England and is not known to have been personally initiated into a lodge. Judah also drew more than 200 figures and vignettes to illustrate Talmudical subjects, which his son Solomon gave to Willem Surenhuis for his Latin translation of the Mishnah.
