= Freemasonry in the United Kingdom =

Freemasonry in the United Kingdom is an initiatory society that developed independently in medieval Scotland and England. Freemasons were originally stonemasons that formed individual lodges across the country. The first manuscript constitution derives from 1352 in York. During the 17th century the organisation began to take on a more familiar form as it increased in membership in the aftermath of the Great Fire of London. The organisation split into opposing factions in the 18th century but reunited to form the United Grand Lodge of England in 1813. During the 20th and 21st centuries, accusations were made that the Freemasons have undue influence over the police.

== History ==
Freemasonry has existed in the United Kingdom in a recognisable form since the early 17th century, but with distinct origins in medieval England and Scotland. The Masonic lodges originated as groups of stonemasons who developed a hierarchical and traditionalist initiatory organisation that makes heavy use of symbolism from religion and the traditional craft of masonry. The Gould Thesis, proposed by Masonic historian Robert Freke Gould in the late 19th century, speculated that the Masons had their origin in the workers' lodges of stonecutters who later admitted gentlemen members. These gentlemen members then introduced the 'speculative' aspect of Freemasonry. Scholars of religious studies Henrik Bogdan and Jan Snoek consider this incorrect, and that gentlemen Masons were attracted to the organisation because of an already-present speculative element.

The 'Old Manuscript Constitutions' that are associated with Freemasonry originate from 1352 in York, 1356 in London, and 1375 in Norwich. By the beginning of the 17th century in Scotland, there were three principal lodges, in Edinburgh, Kilwinning and Stirling. The two lodges at Edinburgh and Kilwinning could not decide which was founded first; they were later both given the status 'time immemorial' when there were no members left alive who could have remembered the timeline. The London lodges increased in membership following the Great Fire of London in 1666 as workers came to rebuild the city. Christopher Wren was elected Grand Master in 1685 but neglected the London lodges. When the building activity in London had finished by the early 18th century, the Masons went elsewhere. Facing difficulties, the London lodges assembled and formed the Grand Lodge of London and Westminster in 1717, with Anthony Sayer elected the Grand Master. Since 1721 when John, Duke of Montague became the first aristocratic Grand Master, all Grand Masters have been aristocrats.

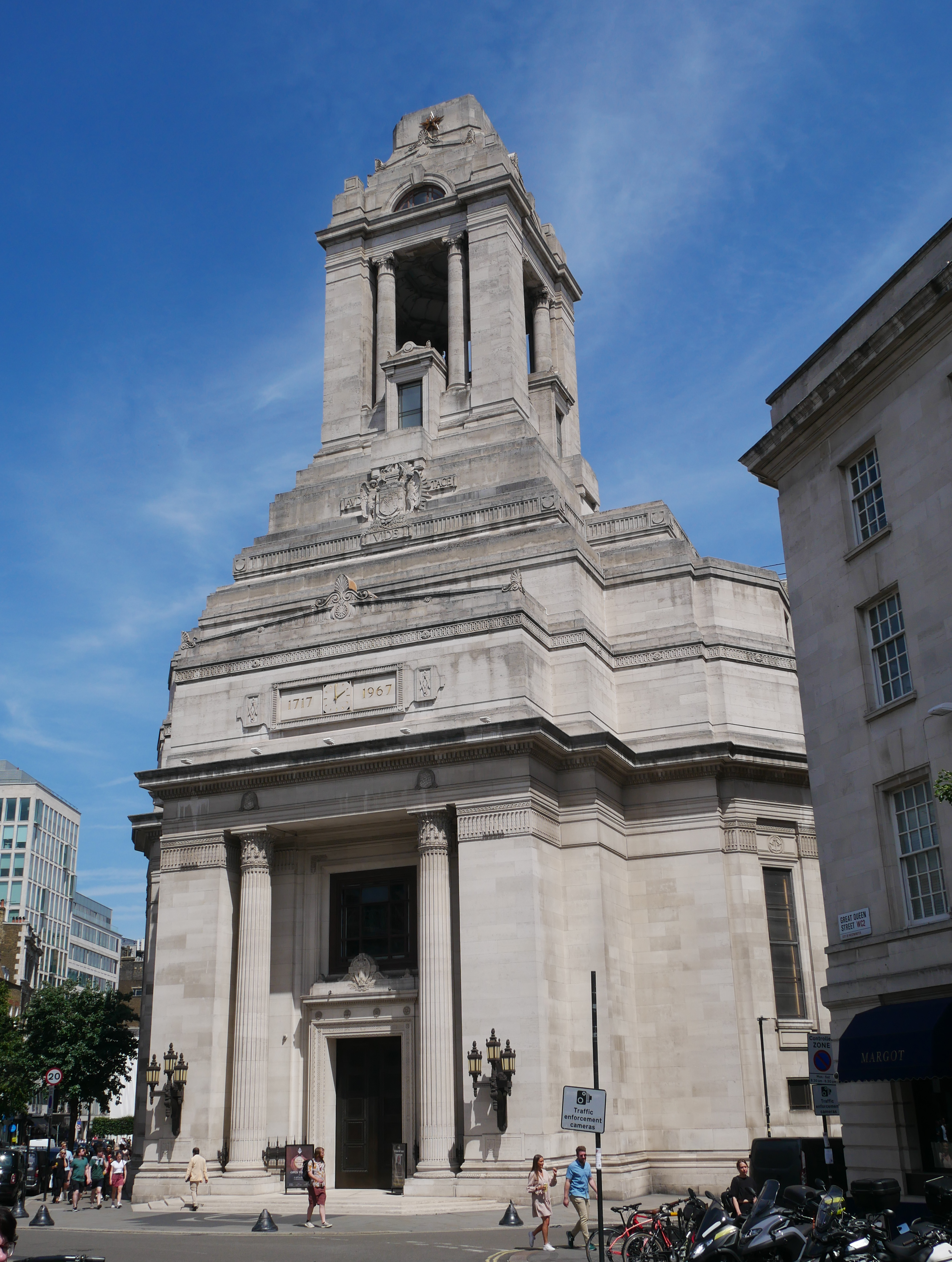
West Entrance of the Freemasons' Hall in London

From 1732 lodges became attached to military regiments. The Grand Lodge of Scotland was formed in 1736. During the 18th century, the lodges split into 'Modern' and 'Ancient' factions. Then in 1813, the two factions merged into the United Grand Lodge of England (UGLE).

== Practices ==
In 16th century Scotland, the candidate for membership paid an entrance fee to finance dinner, and gave a gift of gloves to the members. In 17th–18th century England, the 'Old Manuscript Constitutions' were read aloud during the acceptance of a new member of the lodge. The Masonic rituals changed dramatically in 1816. For example, when initiated during the 18th century, a candidate would be identified with Hiram Abiff, the architect of the Temple of Solomon who was murdered just prior to its completion. Masonic tradition had identified Hiram as God, but the 19th century ritual changes in the UGLE altered the story to reflect the model behaviour of a human, as Hiram refuses to give up his master's teachings to his murderers. In 1964 the masonic oath was declared no longer obligatory.

== Police service ==
The accusation of Masonic influence over the police service in the United Kingdom has been circulating since the 1890s. An 1894 article in Police Review alleged that promotion within the police was impossible if the officer was not a Mason. In 1988 Chief Inspector Brian Woollard alleged that the Freemasons were influencing corruption investigations into Islington Borough Council, and that the police, the council, and the director of public prosecutions' office had a Masonic bias. A 1998 Home Affairs Select Committee concluded that there was no definitive evidence in favour or against the idea that there was undue Masonic influence on the police. In 2026 police officers in the Metropolitan Police were required to reveal their membership of the Freemasons, of which over 300 did so.
