= Eduardo Di Giovanni =

Italian politician (1875–1979)

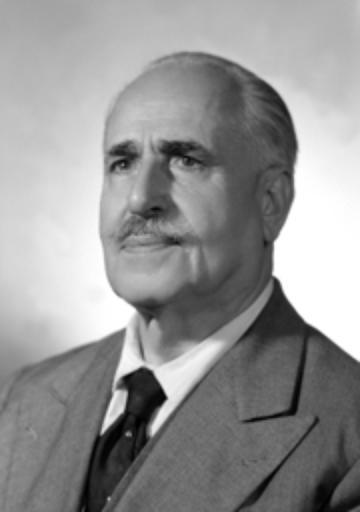
Eduardo Di Giovanni

Eduardo Di Giovanni (Syracuse, 7 November 1875 – Rome, 16 March 1979) was an Italian politician.

He was Deputy in the XXV and XXVI legislature of the Kingdom of Italy. After the World War II he represented the Italian Socialist Party (1946–1947) and the Socialist Party of Italian Workers (1947–1948) in the Constituent Assembly of Italy. Subsequently, he served as Senator from 1948 to 1953, as Undersecretary for Industry and Commerce from 1949 to 1951 and as delegate of the Senate to the Assembly of the Council of Europe (1948–1951).

Started in Freemasonry in the Archimedes Lodge of Syracuse on 29 April 1912, he became Mason Master on 24 June 1913, after the war he was also a member of the Universe Lodge of Rome, belonging to the Grand Orient of Italy, of which he was appointed honorary Grand Master on 9 January 1954. He died aged 103 in 1979.
