= Regular Grand Lodge of Italy =

The Regular Grand Lodge of Italy (Gran Loggia Regolare degli Antichi, Liberi e Accettati Muratori d'Italia - GLRI) is an Italian regular Masonic body and is one of the two Masonic communions currently recognized by the United Grand Lodge of England in Italy.

== History ==
It was founded in 1993 by Giuliano Di Bernardo, a university professor of philosophy of science and former Grand Master of the Grand Orient of Italy (GOI). Following controversies arising from the scandal of the submerged P2 lodge within the Grand Orient of Italy and the subsequent withdrawal of recognition of that obedience by the United Grand Lodge of England, Di Bernardo left the GOI and established a new Masonic communion. This new body, strictly adhering to the principles of Masonic regularity, was named the Regular Grand Lodge of Italy. It quickly obtained recognition from the British regular Grand Lodges—namely, the United Grand Lodge of England, the Grand Lodge of Scotland, and the Grand Lodge of Ireland. In December 2001, the university professor and sociologist Fabio Venzi was elected Grand Master of the GLRI, a position he still holds, while Giuliano Di Bernardo eventually departed from the Regular Grand Lodge of Italy. Subsequently, the Grand Orient of Italy and the Regular Grand Lodge of Italy vied for recognition of the regular Masonic communions of the world, with the Regular Grand Lodge of Italy remaining, for thirty years, the only Italian Masonic obedience recognized by the United Grand Lodge of England. It was only in March 2023 that the Grand Orient of Italy regained recognition from the United Grand Lodge of England, which now acknowledges two Masonic bodies in Italy — the GLRI and the GOI— with the consent of both Masonic bodies.

== Current Situation ==
Today, the Regular Grand Lodge of Italy maintains mutual recognition with regular Grand Lodges from all five continents. It is a member of the European Conference of Grand Masters, the European Conference of Grand Secretaries and Grand Chancellors, and an ex officio member of the World Conference of Regular Grand Lodges. Notably, the Regular Grand Lodge of Italy remains the only Italian Masonic body recognized by the Grand Lodge of Scotland, the Grand Lodge of Ireland and the regular Masonic Orders of Scandinavia. Additionally, it possesses a Supreme Grand Chapter of the Free Masons of the Royal Arch of Italy along with the associated Masonic Mark degree. Nearly all lodges within the Regular Grand Lodge of Italy operate using the Emulation ritual.

== Regularity ==
The Regular Grand Lodge of Italy is recognised as a regular Grand Lodge by many regular Grand Lodges all over the world, including the United Grand Lodge of England.

It adheres to the rules for Recognition (based on Regularity) given by the United Grand Lodge of England in 1929:

- The Grand Lodge should be established by an existing regular Grand Lodge, or by at least three regular Lodges.
- A belief in a supreme being and scripture is a condition of membership.
- Initiates should take their vows on that scripture.
- Only men can be admitted, and no relationship exists with mixed Lodges.
- The Grand Lodge has complete control over the first three degrees and is not subject to another body.
- All Lodges shall display a volume of scripture with the square and compasses while in session.
- There is no discussion of politics or religion.
- "Ancient landmarks, customs and usages" observed.

== See also ==
- Freemasonry
- Freemasonry in Italy
- Grand Orient of Italy
