= Salom Italia =

Italian engraver

- Born: c. 1619 possibly Mantua, Duchy of Mantua
- Died: c. 1655 (aged 35–36) possibly Amsterdam, Dutch Republic
- Known for: engraving

Salom Italia or Salomo d'Italia (c. 1619 – c. 1655) was an Italian copper engraver who worked in Amsterdam. He became known particularly for his illustrations for the Book of Esther, which merged ideas about the Jewish diaspora with those of Dutch liberation after the Eighty Years' War.

== Biography ==
Salom Italia was likely born ca. 1619 in Mantua, Duchy of Mantua, where his father Mordechai operated a printing house. Earlier suggestions, that he had been born in Castel Branco, were denied by Narkiss in 1957. Narkiss argues that he left Mantua after the Austrians invaded, and left for the Republic of Venice, and settled in Amsterdam at the latest in 1641, where he began working as an artist and where he likely stayed until his death.

He was one of only a few Jewish artists working in Amsterdam. Of the ten known works he signed, two are dated. Most of his copper engravings pertain to the Book of Esther. He is known also for his portraits of the rabbis Jacob Judah Leon (1641, and another in 1647) and Menasse ben Israel (1642), and for the Jewish marriage contracts he illustrated.

=== Esther scrolls ===
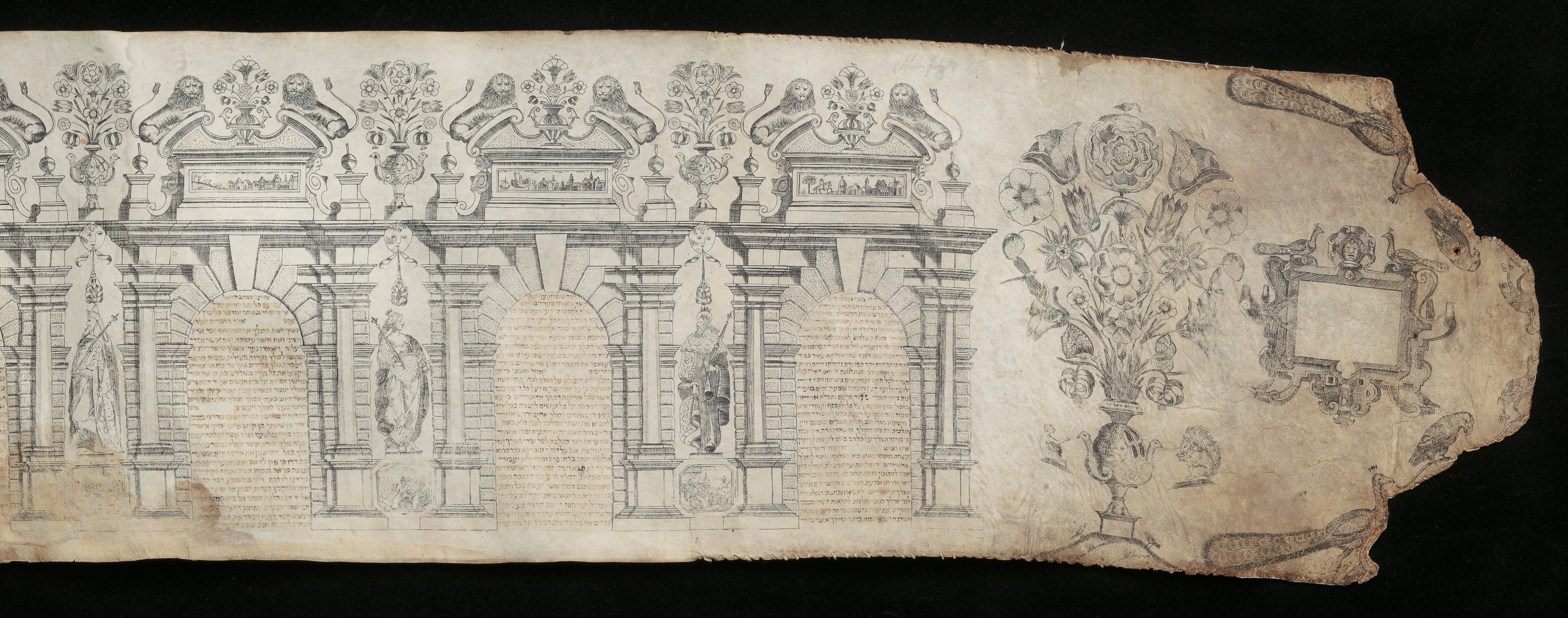
Esther scroll, Jewish Museum (Manhattan)

In Amsterdam, Italia developed a new way of illustrating the parchment scrolls that contained the Book of Esther, scrolls which were used during Purim—during those services, the text was read out loud, while congregants read along with their own copies. Italia's illustrations included triumphal arches, portraits of the main characters, and narrative scenes and vignettes against the backdrop of Dutch landscapes. They merged the Jewish diaspora and Jews' integration in the Dutch Republic with the (recent) Dutch experience of liberation from their Spanish overlords after the Eighty Years' War. Italia's scrolls were very popular at a time when the Esther story held considerable importance in the Netherlands; six of them were gathered for a 2011 exhibition in the Joods Historisch Museum in Amsterdam.

== Gallery ==
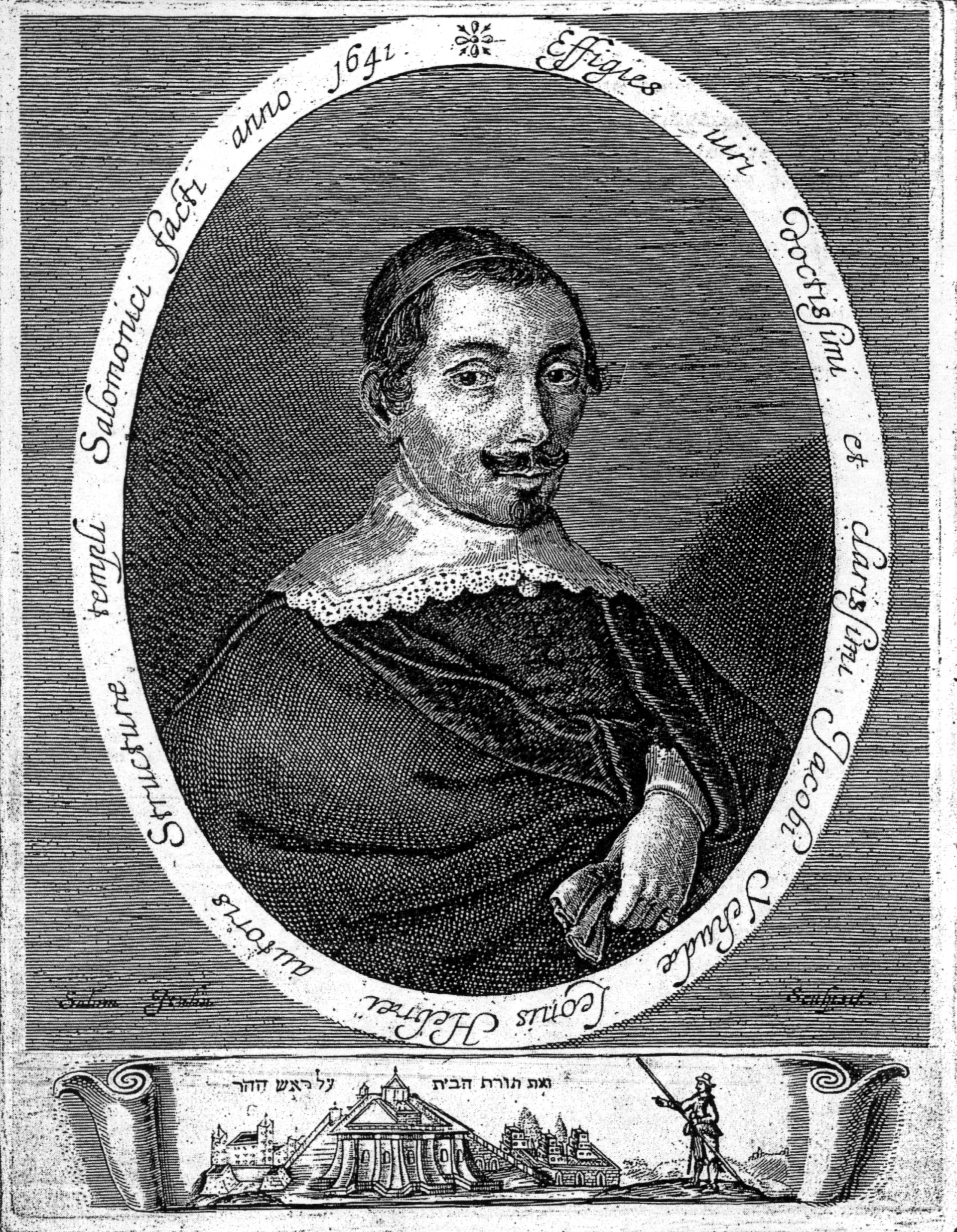
Jacob Judah Leon

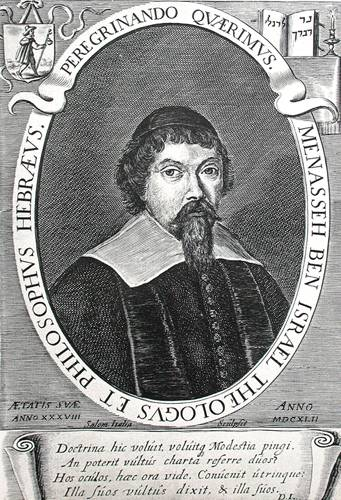
Menasseh ben Israel

== Sources ==
- Narkiss, Mordechai (1956–57). "The Oeuvre of the Jewish Engraver Salom Italia (1619–1655?)". Tarbiẕ (25, 26): 441–451, 87–101. JSTOR 23588702.
- Kirschenstein, Salli (1918). Juedische Graphiker aus der Zeit von 1625–1825 (in German). Berlin.
- Narkiss, Bezalel (2007). "Italia, Shalom". Encyclopaedia Judaica. Vol. 10 (2 ed.). Detroit/New York. p. 787. ISBN 978-0-02-865938-1.
- Assaf, Sharon; Bilski, Emily D., eds. (2011). Salom Italia's Esther scrolls and the Dutch Golden Age. Essay Series in Jewish Culture and Art. Vol. 1. Amsterdam: Joods Historisch Museum. ISBN 978-90-81586-03-0.
- Sabar, Shalom (2012). "A New Discovery: The Earliest Illustrated Esther Scroll by Shalom Italia". Ars Judaica (8): 119–136.
