= Ahiman Rezon =

Book by Laurence Dermott

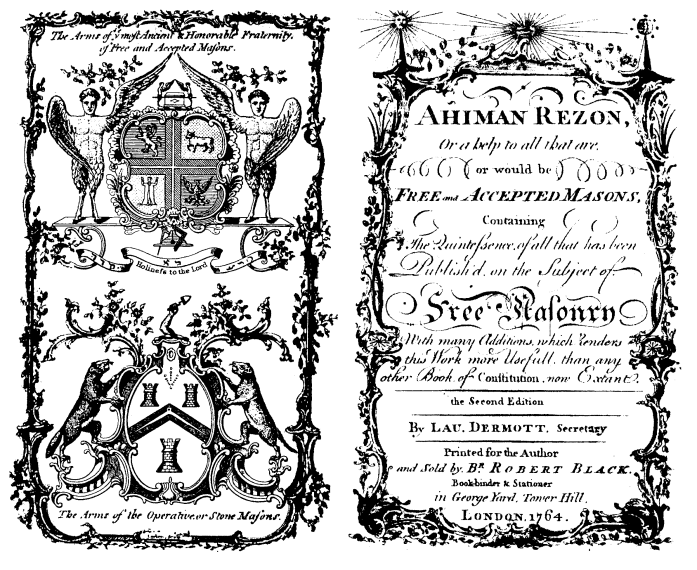
The Ahiman Rezon, an edition from 1756

The Book of Constitutions of this Grand Lodge or Ahiman Rezon was a constitution written by Laurence Dermott for the Ancient Grand Lodge of England which was formed in 1751. The formation of the Ancient Grand Lodge brought together lodges and Masons who, believing themselves to be part of an older, original Masonic tradition, had chosen not to ally themselves with the previously formed Moderns Grand Lodge of 1717.

== Title ==
The title Ahiman Rezon has been often said to be based on the Hebrew language and to variously mean "to help a brother", "will of selected brethren", "The secrets of prepared brethren", "Royal Builders" and "Brother Secretary". Upon more inspection however, the words Ahriman and Rezon represent two Biblical figures.

It is generally accepted that the title was based on the Hebrew language. The explanation below and the names mentioned have no logical bearing on Freemasonry as such and are in no way related to Biblical figures. The main proof is the written word of Dermott who for the latter name wrote in Hebrew רצון not רזון. The correct translation when separated into three separate Hebrew words is MY BROTHER IS WILLING which in Hebrew reads אחי מן רצון. When this meaning is added to the words of his frontispiece it then becomes the phrase "My brother is willing to help / assist brother freemasons..". Dermott, when writing his own name in Hebrew script, made three obvious errors of script.

Ahiman is depicted in 1 Chronicles 9. He was one of four Levite gatekeepers appointed by King David. The others gatekeepers were Shallum, Akkub, and Talmon. They jointly guarded the Holy of Holies, the inner sanctuary of the Tabernacle.

Rezon is depicted in 1 Kings 11. He was a fallen prince, who eventually came to lead a group of marauders (bandits) to seize Syria. He became a king in Syria and was constantly entangled in feuds against King Solomon.

The reason why Laurence Dermott used these Biblical names, and what they meant to him, remains a mystery. Scholars and experts have speculated that Dermott chose these names to convey how Ancient Freemasons felt in relation to Modern Freemasons. Ancient Freemasons sought to retain a purist form of Freemasonry, which they viewed as having older rituals from medieval stone mason guilds. The Modern Freemasons sought to change Freemasonry with updated and standardized rituals that were more akin to business meetings. Dermott likened the Ancients to Ahiman, guarding the Holiest of Holies, and therefore Freemasonry. He viewed the Ancients as likewise akin to Rezon as their movement (the Ancient Freemasons) were rivaling the Modernist movement, much like Rezon's rivalry with King Solomon who had become unclean in the eyes of the Lord.

The Ahiman Rezon prepared by Smith in 1781, and used by the Grand Lodge of Pennsylvania, as well as Daicho's edition of 1807, used by the Grand Lodge of Ancient York Masons of South Carolina, are both based on the original text written by Laurence Dermott, which was first published in A.D. 1756 or the year of Masonry A.L. 5756.

== History ==
The first edition of the Ahiman Rezon was published in 1756, a second one in 1764. By the time the Ancients and Moderns united in 1813, eight editions had been published.

The original edition, written by Laurence Dermott which is the text Grand Secretary of the Ancient Grand Lodge, contains a parody of the histories of Freemasonry such as that in Anderson's 'Constitutions', in which Dermott resolves to write a history of the Craft by purchasing all the previous histories and then throwing them 'under the table'. He then describes a fabled meeting with four 'sojourners from Jerusalem' who were present at the building of Solomon's Temple, making them at least two thousand years old, whose 'memories' were possibly failing them.

This satire continues the tradition of the Scald Miserable Masons who staged mock processions and disrupted the Grand Lodge's annual procession. Dermott's political purpose in writing the Ahiman Rezon is revealed in his short history of famous leaders of the ancient world who were of 'mean extraction, that is poor, such as Tamerlane the son of a herdsman, and on the cover which shows the arms of the Worshipful Company of Masons as well as those of the Freemasons, possibly in an attempt to re-connect Freemasonry to its operative and artisan roots.

The Grand Lodges of Pennsylvania and South Carolina are the only two jurisdictions in the U.S. that continue to call their Constitution by this name. In Section 12 of the Pennsylvania Ahiman Rezon, under Historical Notes, it states the following:

The first Book of Masonic law published by the Grand Lodge of Pennsylvania was entitled: "Ahiman Rezon abridged and digested" as a help to all that are or would be Free and Accepted Masons." It was prepared by the Grand Secretary, Rev. Brother William Smith, D.D., Provost of the University of Pennsylvania, and was almost entirely a reprint of Dermott’s work; it was approved by the Grand Lodge 22 November 1781, published in 1783, and dedicated to Brother George Washington.

== Ahiman Rezon of 1764 ==
"C H A R G E I.

Concerning GOD and Religion
A MASON is obliged by his tenure to observe the moral law as a true Noachida*; and if he rightly understands the craft, he will never be a stupid atheist nor an irreligious libertine, nor act against conscience.
In antient times, the christian masons were charged to comply with the christian usages of each country where they traveled or worked; being found in all nations, even of divers religions.
They are generally charged to adhere to that religion in which all men agree (leaving each brother to his own particular opinion; ) that is, to be good men and true, men of honour and honesty, by whatever names, religions, or persuasions they may be distinguished; for they all agree in the three great articles of Noah, enough to preserve the cement of the lodge.
Thus masonry is the center of their union, and the happy means of conciliating persons that otherwise must have remained at a perpetual distance.
- Sons of Noah, the first name of Free-Masons."

== See also ==
- Anderson's Constitutions
- Masonic manuscripts
