= Grand Orient of Italy =

Italian masonic grand lodge

Coordinates: 41.8992°N 12.4753°E

Grande Oriente d'Italia
- Formation: 1805; 221 years ago
- Type: Masonic Grand Lodge
- Headquarters: Il Vascello, Via San Pancrazio 8, 00152 Rome
- Location: Italy
- Grand Master: Antonio Seminario
- Website: grandeoriente.it

The Grand Orient of Italy (GOI) (Italian: Grande Oriente d'Italia) is an Italian masonic grand lodge founded in 1805; the viceroy Eugène de Beauharnais was instrumental in its establishment. It was based at the Palazzo Giustiniani, Rome, Italy from 1901 until 1985 and is now located at the Villa del Vascello. Its current Grand Master is Stefano Bisi.

As of September 2015 the Grand Orient had 22,675 members in 842 lodges, a significant growth over the preceding three-year period.

== History ==
The Grand Orient of Italy was founded in 1805, during the Napoleonic Kingdom of Italy; the viceroy Eugene of Beauharnais was instrumental in its establishment.

Past Grand Masters have included:

- Giuseppe Garibaldi,
- Adriano Lemmi, 1885–96
- Sculptor Ettore Ferrari,
- Mayor of Rome Ernesto Nathan

Freemasonry was suppressed by Mussolini in 1925, being restarted after the Second World War. Nevertheless, many people connected with the Italian Fascism were Freemasons: Edmondo Rossoni, Araldo di Crollalanza, Alfredo De Marsico, Peppino Caradonna, Bernardo Barbiellini Amidei, Aldo Finzi, Balbino Giuliano e Costanzo Ciano, father of Galeazzo, Alberto Beneduce, Giacomo Acerbo, Ezio Maria Gray, and Armando Casalini, among others.

In 2013, Gustavo Raffi, the then Gran Master of the Grand Orient of Italy, addressed special warm greetings to Pope Francis for his election, signing a new period of reconciliation between Freemasonry and the Roman Catholic Church.

== Regularity ==
Recognition by the United Grand Lodge of England (UGLE) is a key factor in maintaining the status of a Regular Masonic jurisdiction. The Grand Orient of Italy was once a significant player within international Freemasonry, and in 1972 it was recognised as regular by UGLE. However, this recognition was withdrawn in 1993, due to accusations of corruption and Mafia involvement. For thirty years, the Regular Grand Lodge of Italy was the only Italian Grand Lodge recognised by UGLE or the other home constitutions of Ireland and Scotland. However, the Grand Orient continued to be recognised by a large majority of the other regular masonic jurisdictions, both in Europe and worldwide.

This situation was highly unusual, in that most regular authorities recognised the Grand Orient, but its status was complicated by the lack of recognition from the three most senior jurisdictions, which normally give a lead in terms of international recognition. To further complicate the situation, the United Grand Lodge of England publicly stated that the Grand Orient of Italy was regular in both origins and practices, but that it must (at that time) remain unrecognised due to the issues surrounding alleged corruption.

However, this position was rectified in March 2023, when the United Grand Lodge of England agreed to re-recognise the Grand Orient of Italy alongside the Regular Grand Lodge of Italy.

Propaganda Due, the lodge that investigative journalists have identified as being implicated in the murder of Roberto Calvi, was originally chartered by the Grand Orient, although the Grand Orient revoked its charter in 1974.

== List of grand masters ==
Prior to Gustavo Raffi's grand mastership, two terms of five years was the maximum tenure for a grand master. This, however, was changed during Raffi's time, and his three-term grand mastership which began in 1999 ended in 2014.

#	Name (Birth-Death)	Term		Origin	Occupation
1	Eugène de Beauharnais (1781–1824)	1805	1814	Paris, France	Viceroy of Italy (1805–1814)
Lodge suppressed
2	Filippo Delpino (1779–1860)	20 December 1859	20 May 1860 †	Genoa, Piedmont-Sardinia	Patriot
3	Livio Zambeccari (1802–1862)	21 May 1860	3 October 1861	Bologna, Papal States	Naturalist, patriot
4	Costantino Nigra (1828–1907)	8 October 1861	31 January 1862	Castelnuovo, Piedmont-Sardinia	Italian Ambassador to Austria-Hungary (1885–1887)
5	Filippo Cordova (1811–1868)	1 March 1862	6 August 1863	Aidone, Kingdom of Naples	Minister of Justice (1862)
6	Celestino Peroglio (1824–1909)	6 August 1863	24 May 1864	Palestro, Lombardy–Venetia	Teacher
7	Giuseppe Garibaldi (1807–1882)	24 May 1864	8 August 1864	Nice, Piedmont-Sardinia	Member of the Chamber of Deputies (1861–1882)
8	Francesco De Luca (1811–1875)	September 1864	20 June 1867	Cardinale, Kingdom of Naples	Member of the Chamber of Deputies (1861–1874)
	Filippo Cordova (1811–1868)	21 June 1867	2 August 1867	Aidone, Kingdom of Naples	Minister of Justice (1867)
9	Lodovico Frapolli (1815–1878)	2 August 1867	7 September 1870	Milan, Lombardy–Venetia	Member of the Chamber of Deputies (1860–1874)
10	Giuseppe Mazzoni (1808–1880)	7 September 1870	11 May 1880 †	Prato, Tuscany	Founder of P2; Senator of the Kingdom (1876–1880)
11	Giuseppe Petroni (1812–1888)	12 May 1880	16 January 1885	Bologna, Papal States	Lawyer
12	Adriano Lemmi (1822–1906)	17 January 1885	31 May 1896	Livorno, Tuscany	Banker, businessman
13	Ernesto Nathan (1845–1921)	1 June 1896	14 February 1904	London, UK	Co-founder of Dante Alighieri Society; later Mayor of Rome (1907–1913)
14	Ettore Ferrari (1845–1929)	15 February 1904	25 November 1917	Rome, Papal States	Sculptor
	Ernesto Nathan (1845–1921)	26 November 1917	22 June 1919	London, UK	Co-founder of Dante Alighieri Society; later Mayor of Rome (1907–1913)
15	Domizio Torrigiani (1876–1932)	23 June 1919	23 April 1927	Lamporecchio, Italy	Lawyer
/	Eugenio Chiesa (1863–1930)	12 January 1930	22 June 1930 †	Milan, Italy	Member of the Chamber of Deputies (1904–1929)
/	Arturo Labriola (1873–1959)	23 June 1930	29 November 1931	Naples, Italy	Member of the Chamber of Deputies (1913–1929)
16	Alessandro Tedeschi (1867–1940)	32 August 1932	19 August 1940 †	Livorno, Italy	Surgeon
17	Davide Augusto Albarin (1881–1959)	19 August 1940	10 June 1944	Paris, French Empire	Anti-fascist activist
18	Guido Laj (1880–1948)	18 September 1945	5 November 1948 †	Messina, Italy	Journalist, politician
19	Ugo Lenzi (1875–1953)	19 March 1949	21 April 1953 †	Bologna, Italy	Lawyer
20	Publio Cortini (1895–1969)	4 October 1953	27 September 1956	Rome, Italy	Businessman, engineer
21	Umberto Cipollone (1883–1960)	30 November 1957	28 May 1960 †	Lanciano, Italy	Lawyer
22	Giorgio Tron (1884–1963)	29 May 1960	28 April 1961	Villar Pellice, Italy	Surgeon
23	Giordano Gamberini (1915–2003)	17 July 1961	21 March 1970	Ravenna, Italy	Writer, politician
24	Lino Salvini (1925–1982)	22 March 1970	18 November 1978	Florence, Italy	Writer, politician
25	Ennio Battelli (1919–1984)	18 November 1978	27 March 1982	Urbino, Italy	Businessman, military officer
26	Armando Corona (1921–2009)	28 March 1982	10 March 1990	Villaputzu, Italy	Businessman, politician
27	Giuliano Di Bernardo (1939–)	11 March 1990	16 April 1993	Penne, Italy	Philosopher, writer
28	Virgilio Gaito (1930–)	18 December 1993	21 March 1999	Naples, Italy	Lawyer
29	Gustavo Raffi (1944–)	21 March 1999	6 April 2014	Bagnacavallo, Italy	Lawyer
30	Stefano Bisi (1957–)	6 April 2014	6 April 2024	Siena, Italy	Journalist, writer
31	Antonio Seminario (1958–)	6 April 2024	"incumbent"	Crosia, Italy	Businessman

== Bibliography ==
- Enrico Simoni, Bibliografia della Massoneria in Italia, Foggia, Edizioni Bastogi, 1° volume 1992 (3471 schede), 2° volume 1993 (indici sistematici degli articoli delle Riviste massoniche del dopoguerra; 3762 schede), 1° volume di aggiornamento 1997 (schede da 3472 a 4584), 3° volume 2006 (indici sistematici degli articoli della "Rivista della Massoneria Italiana" e della "Rivista Massonica"; 1870–1926; 6478 schede), 2° volume di aggiornamento 2010 (schede da 4585 a 6648)

== Awards and recognitions ==
On 22 February 2020, the Grand Orient of Italy received the International Award "Leonardo The Immortal Light" in the Semiotics section, a recognition promoted by the International Committee Leonardo da Vinci. The award was presented during an official ceremony held in Sesto San Giovanni.
