= Antient Grand Lodge of England =

Type of grand lodge

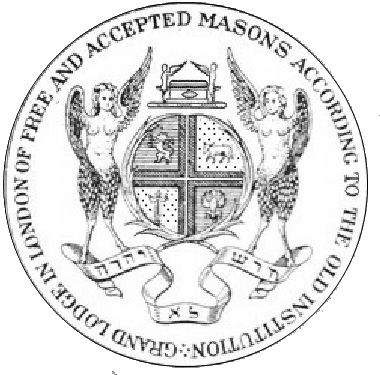
Seal of the "Antients" Grand Lodge, based on a drawing by Judah Leon Templo.

The Antient Grand Lodge of England, as it is known today, or The Grand Lodge of the Most Antient and Honourable Fraternity of Free and Accepted Masons (according to the Old Constitutions granted by His Royal Highness Prince Edwin, at York, Anno Domini nine hundred and twenty six, and in the year of Masonry four thousand nine hundred and twenty six) as they described themselves on their warrants, was a rival Grand Lodge to the Premier Grand Lodge of England. It existed from 1751 until 1813 when the United Grand Lodge of England was created from the two Grand Lodges. They are now called the Antients, in contrast to the Moderns, the original Grand Lodge which its critics, notably Laurence Dermott, said had moved away from the ritual of Scotland, Ireland, and now the Antient Grand Lodge. This Grand Lodge was also informally called the Atholl Grand Lodge because the Third and Fourth Dukes of Atholl presided over it as Grand Masters for half of its 62-year existence.

The Antients were founded on the same religious and class tensions that underpinned Methodism's success in challenging the Church of England. In addition, the Antient Grand Lodge forged closer links than the Premier Grand Lodge with the Grand Lodges of Scotland and Ireland, and the sought to recruit members from the lower classes in the English provinces unlike the more metropolitan and elite Premier Grand Lodge. The Premier Grand Lodge was Whig and rationalist, while the Antient Grand Lodge has been seen reflecting counter-enlightenment tendencies.

Although the Grand Lodge never spelled Antient with a "t", the convention was followed by the Moderns, and continues to be used by United Grand Lodge. Some confusion arises from the Ancients' own documentation. Their seals are inscribed Grand Lodge in London of Free and Accepted Masons According to the Old Institution(s), while in their masonic certificates, issued to new members, they called themselves the Grand Lodge of Free and Accepted Masons of England according to the Old Constitutions.

== History ==
From about 1721, the new Grand Lodge which had been formed in London in 1717, and would soon spread to the rest of England, Wales, and abroad, pursued a policy of self-publicity and expansion that did not always sit well with other Freemasons. They abandoned the old methods of "drawing" lodges with chalk, (erased with a mop) in favour of tape and portable metal letters. In 1735 they refused admission to the Master and Wardens of an Irish lodge who claimed to be a deputation from Lord Kingston, then Grand Master of Ireland and past Grand Master of the English Grand Lodge. The Irish masons were offered admission if they would accept the English constitution, which they refused. In the 1730s the English Grand Lodge had changed their ritual to stay ahead of public exposures. During this period, London absorbed many economic migrants from Ireland. Those who were already masons were often repelled by the changes introduced by the English Grand Lodge, and either formed their own lodges, or joined one of the many unaffiliated lodges in the capital. In 1751, five of these, and a sixth that had just been formed, united to form a rival Grand Lodge, which quickly became an umbrella organisation for the other unaffiliated lodges in England.

This success must be seen as a triumph of the energy, wit, and sheer belligerence of their second Grand Secretary, Laurence Dermott. Most of what we know of him comes from the minutes of Grand Lodge and from his book of constitutions. The Grand Committee met on the first Wednesday of every month, and on 5 February 1752, Dermott replaced John Morgan as Grand Secretary. The next month he dealt with the "Leg of Mutton" masons, two men who had initiated masons into the Royal Arch for the price of a leg of mutton, but on examination by Dermott, knew nothing of the degree. They also claimed to teach a masonic method of achieving invisibility. In April he persuaded his brethren to replace Morgan's bye-laws with those of his own lodge in Dublin. June saw Dermott installing the Grand Officers. The lodge met as usual on Wednesday 2 September, and were treated to a lecture on their ritual by Dermott. Due to the change that year from the Julian to the Gregorian Calendar, the next day was Thursday 14 September, losing 11 days. The actual business of the lodge was conducted at an "emergency" meeting on the 14th, ensuring both dates appeared in the minutes.

Dermott gave them a book of constitutions, inexplicably entitled "Ahiman Rezon, or a Help to a Brother". It was modeled on Spratt's Irish Constitutions, which in turn were modeled on Anderson's constitutions. The introductory history was replaced by a satirical account of Dermott's attempt to write a better one (which would trace Freemasonry to before the Creation). The publication of the first edition, in 1756, may have been delayed until the society had found a noble sponsor to act as Grand Master. He arrived in the form of the Earl of Blessington, who had already served as Grand Master in Ireland. The second edition, in 1764, compared the ancient practices of the new Grand Lodge with the works of the "Moderns". The older Grand Lodge had been castigated as the "Moderns" since the 1720s, and the term is still used today. Dermott's characterisation of the Moderns is scathing and satirical, and with each succeeding edition during his lifetime, more scorn is heaped on the society that deviated from the established landmarks of the order, and whose greatest masonic symbols were the knife and fork. After his death, in 1791, successive editors of Ahiman Rezon progressively excised the insults.

The Ahiman Rezon, although divisive, proved popular, and the Ancients flourished. They were recognised by the Grand Lodges of Ireland and Scotland, who continued to view the innovations of the Moderns with suspicion. A low point in relations between the two Grand Lodges was reached in the 1770s, when William Preston, then assistant Grand Secretary of the Moderns, attempted to poison the relationship between the Ancients and the Grand Lodge of Scotland.

After Dermott's death, the two Grand Lodges moved slowly towards union. The need for unity was underlined during the Napoleonic wars, when the leaders of the Ancients, Moderns, and the Grand Lodge of Scotland acted together to prevent their lodges becoming proscribed organisations. However, the actual process of unification did not start until 1811, when the Moderns started the administrative process of returning their ritual to a form acceptable to the other British Grand Lodges. The final union was in the hands of two sons of the King, the Duke of Sussex, the Grand Master of the Moderns, and the Duke of Kent. Kent had already effected a union in Canada by simply abolishing the Moderns, and merging their lodges with those of the Ancients. The new Grand Lodge, the United Grand Lodge of England, retained the infrastructure of the Moderns, and the ritual of the Ancients.

== Revival in Lancashire ==
In 1823, the mishandling of grievances of a few Lancastrian masons led to an attempt to revive the Ancients in what has come to be known as the Wigan Grand Lodge. Mistrust of the new Grand Lodge was already simmering when the Provincial Grand Lodge meeting at Manchester in 1818 asked that the book of constitutions be amended to state that a lodge must hand back its warrant if membership falls below 7, instead of the 5 stated. Further concern was shown when some masons in Bath were told that it was "not desirable to make the Number of (Royal Arch) Chapters in any place equal to the Number of Lodges." The low minimum implied that it was possible to run a lodge without Deacons, in the manner of the Moderns ritual, and the Ancients had looked on the Royal Arch as the fourth degree, making the formation of a Chapter the duty of every lodge. These queries, prompted by a concern as to a creeping return, or even imposition, of Modernism on old Ancient's lodges, were ignored by Grand Lodge. This led to a more strongly worded remonstrance in 1820. As the local province failed to deal with increasing animosity, in 1822 the 34 masons who signed the last document were suspended by Grand Lodge, and one Liverpool lodge was erased. Although many of the rebels returned to the fold or left masonry altogether, the harshness of their treatment drew support from other lodges in the North West of England. A new Grand Lodge was formed in Liverpool in 1823, calling itself the Grand Lodge of Free and Accepted Masons of England according to the Old Constitutions. From 1825, it met only in Wigan. As the original dispute was gradually forgotten, its twelve or more lodges were re-absorbed by UGLE, although the last did not rejoin until 1913. It ceased to function as a Grand Lodge in 1866.

== Grand Masters ==
- 1753, Robert Turner
- 1754–1756, Edward Vaughan
- 1756–1760, William Stewart, 1st Earl of Blessington
- 1760–1766, Thomas Erskine, 6th Earl of Kellie
- 1766–1770, Hon. Thomas Mathew
- 1771–1774, John Murray, 3rd Duke of Atholl
- 1775–1781, John Murray, 4th Duke of Atholl
- 1783–1791, Randal MacDonnell, 6th Earl of Antrim
- 1791–1812, John Murray, 4th Duke of Atholl
- 1813, Prince Edward Augustus, Duke of Kent and Strathearn

== Grand Secretaries ==
- 1751, John Morgan
- 1752–1770, Laurence Dermott
- 1771–1776, William Dickey
- 1777–1778, James Jones
- 1779–1782, Charles Bearblock
- 1783–1784, Robert Leslie
- 1785–1789, John McCormick
- 1790–1813, Robert Leslie

== See also ==
- History of Freemasonry
- Masonic Manuscripts
- Swedenborg Society
