= Laurence Dermott =

Irish merchant and freemason

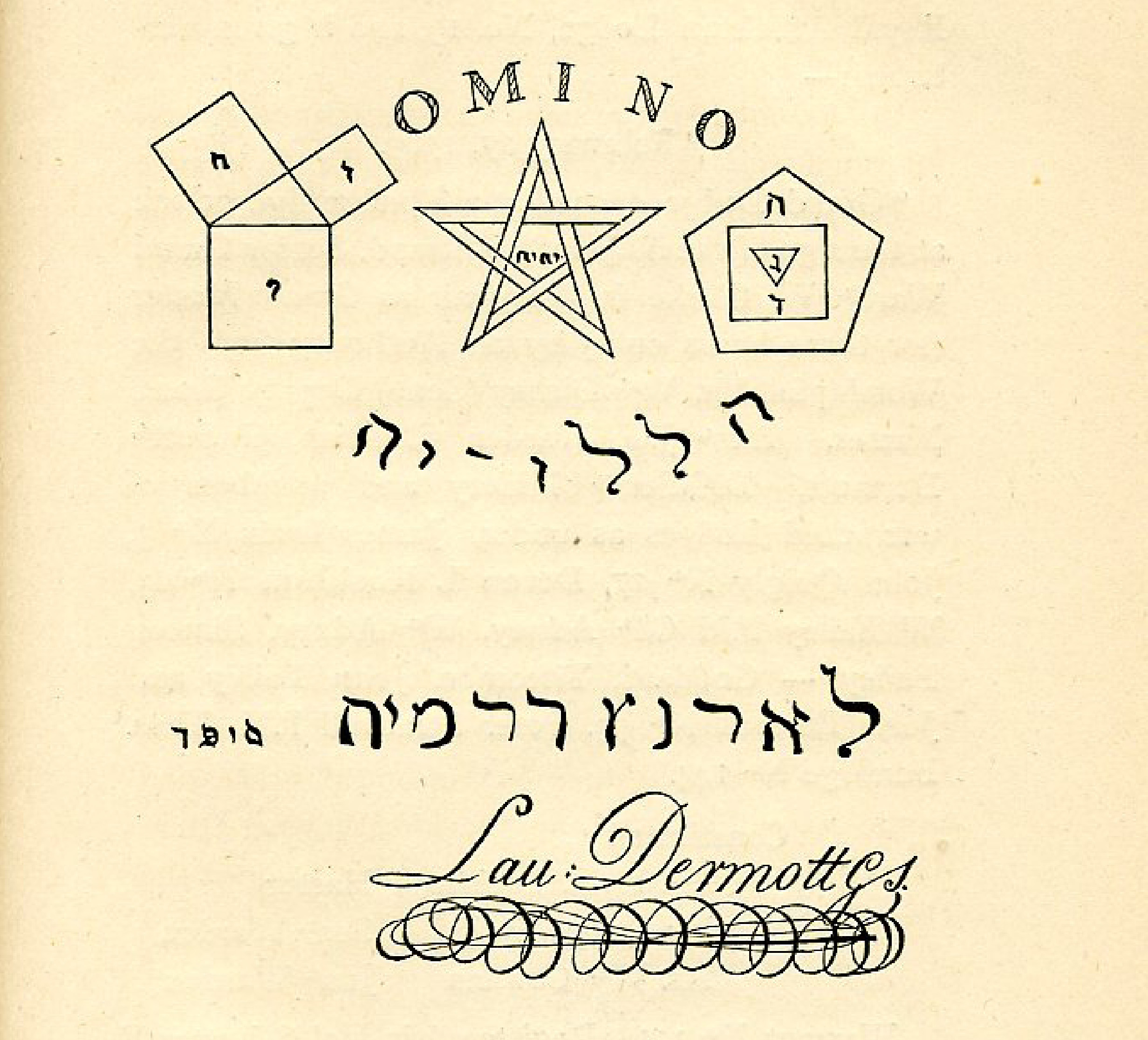
Page from the Minute Book of the Ancient's Grand Lodge in Dermott's Hand

Laurence Dermott (/ˈdɜːrmət/; 1720 – June 1791) was born in Ireland and became a Freemason in 1741. He held various offices before being installed as Worshipful Master of Lodge No. 26 in Dublin on 24 June 1746. He moved to London in 1748, possibly working as a journeyman painter, and possibly with a view to expanding his father's business. He would later work as a wine merchant, like his father.

He married his first wife, Susanna Neale, a widow, in 1759. She died in 1764. He married his second wife, Mary Windell, also a widow, in 1765 but she died after just three months of marriage in February 1766. Dermott married his third wife Elizabeth Merryman, another widow on 13 November 1766. She had two daughters by her first husband, John Merryman, who had died in 1760. She and Dermott had a son named Laurence after his father in 1767 but he did not survive infancy.

Dermott lived in Aldgate, Mile End and Stepney. He served as Grand Secretary of the Ancient Grand Lodge of England from 1752 to 1771. He wrote and published the Book of Constitutions of this Grand Lodge for the Ancient Grand Lodge of England, which he titled the Ahiman Rezon. Dermott is credited with playing a key role in transforming an association of six London lodges, established in 1751, into the Ancient Grand Lodge of England, which later expanded to include lodges throughout England and the colonies.

== Early life ==
Laurence Dermott was born sometime during 1720, the son of a successful merchant, Thomas Dermott. Thomas and his brother Anthony traded in a variety of goods, and were also wine merchants and ship owners. Although the family traded from Dublin, Laurence was probably born in the family home near Strokestown, County Roscommon. He was initiated into Freemasonry on 14 January 1740–41, according to official records. (New Year still occurred on 25 March, and this method of writing the year was employed to disambiguate the period between 1 January and 24 March.) He became Master of Lodge 26 in Dublin in 1746. His early initiation may indicate that he was following a family tradition by becoming a Freemason. Also in 1746, he became a Royal Arch mason, which would later significantly affect English Freemasonry. He moved to London in 1748, most histories giving his occupation as "Journeyman Painter". Given that he was later a successful wine merchant, he may have moved to England on family business.

== Dermott and Grand Lodge ==
Dermott joined a lodge affiliated to the Premier Grand Lodge of England (the Moderns) on his arrival in London, but he quickly found a home in one of the unaffiliated Irish lodges. His arrival in the history of masonry occurred on 5 February 1752, at the Griffin, a tavern in Holborn, when the Grand Committee of the new Grand Lodge elected him as their second Grand Secretary.

At the next meeting, it was Dermott who examined the "Leg of Mutton Masons", Thomas Phealon and John Mackey. He found that they initiated Freemasons for the price of a leg of mutton, pretended to teach the secrets of the Royal Arch (which they evidently thought was a rainbow), and claimed to teach a masonic ritual for making men invisible. On 1 April, he succeeded in persuading the committee to replace the bye-laws written by the first secretary, John Morgan, with the bye-laws of his own lodge in Dublin.

In 1756, Dermott finally printed the constitutions of the new Grand Lodge, entitled Ahiman Rezon. He probably finished them two years earlier, but delayed publication until the society should find a noble patron to act as Grand Master. After several false starts, the Earl of Blessington agreed to undertake the role, and the volume was then dedicated to him. The constitutions themselves were based on, if not copied from, Spratt's Irish Constitutions, which in turn were based on Anderson's Constitutions, written for the Moderns some three decades earlier. Like Anderson's book, a section of songs was appended, many written by Dermott himself. At the beginning, in place of Anderson's incredible history of the craft, is a humorous account of his own attempt to write a better one, the vision that halted him, and the puppy that ate the manuscript. There is also an explanation of the difference between his own Grand Lodge and the earlier Grand Lodge of England, or "the Moderns", a name which was coined before Dermott, and sticks to them up to present day. In the following three editions published during Dermott's lifetime, there is a reasoned argument that a man contemplating becoming a Freemason should not join the Moderns, because the changes in their ritual meant that he could not be recognised in any other jurisdiction. There is also an increasing amount of sarcasm, parody, and outright scorn directed at the Moderns, whose greatest masonic symbols are the knife and fork. This was gradually edited out in the editions published after his death. The book sold well, and raised the profile of the new Grand Lodge, enabling it to become a truly national phenomenon, warranting lodges abroad and in the Army.

A curious entry in the minutes of July 1753 reads, "The Grand Secretary humbly begged that the lodge would please to appoint some certain person to deliver the summons's for the future, that he the said secretary was under the necessity of delivering or paying for delivery for some months past, as he was obliged to work twelve hours in the day for the Master Painter who employed him." Gould, in his history of Freemasonry, took this as evidence of poverty. The "Master Painter" may have been James Hagarty, who presided over the lodge meeting that employed Dermott as Grand Secretary. The Grand Tyler and the Grand Pursuivant were accordingly saddled with the summonses. In October, Dermott was delegated to "attend and regulate all processions, and at Funerals take particular care that all persons walk in proper rotation". He made no objection to this charge on his time.

Dermott remained Grand Secretary until 1771, at which time he was made Deputy Grand Master. As the Grand Master was at the time little more than a figurehead, it was Dermott who presided at meetings, and effectively ruled Grand Lodge. At the end of his tenure as secretary, he had been absent on several occasions due to being laid low with gout. His last appearance in lodge was in 1789, evidently in failing health. He died in 1791. The location of his grave is unknown.

== Legacy ==
Laurence Dermott had a presence that made many enemies. On one occasion he had to defend himself in Grand Lodge from a charge of not being a regularly initiated Freemason. He was the administrator who was credited with preserving and leading the Ancients through most of their history as an independent Grand Lodge. He is viewed as the reason behind why the United Grand Lodge, as it currently stands, inherits the infrastructure of the Moderns, but takes its ritual from the Ancients.

== Sources ==
- Laurence Dermott
- Albert Mackey, Encyclopedia of Freemasonry, pp. 275–276.
- W. M. Bywater, Notes on Laurence Dermott G. S. and His Work', Kessinger reprint (originally London 1884)
