= George Payne (Freemason) =

English Freemason (1687–1757)

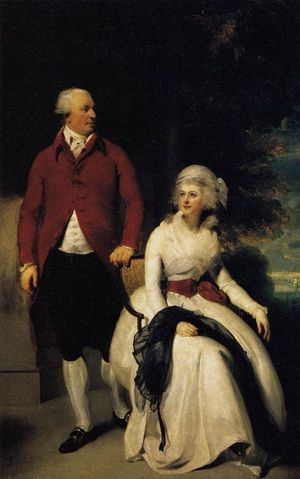
Mr & Mrs John Julius Angerstein by Sir Thomas Lawrence. Mrs Angerstein née Elizabeth Payne was god-daughter and a great-niece of George Payne

George Payne (bap.12 May 1687; 23 January 1757) was an English official of the Exchequer and Freemason.

== Life ==
He was the son of Samuel Payne of Chester and Frances Kendrick or Kenrick. (Note: baptised Holy Trinity, Chester, 12 May 1687) He was appointed Secretary to the Tax Office 20 July 1732, Head Secretary 8 April 1743

Payne became the second Grand Master of the Premier Grand Lodge of England in 1718. After being succeeded by John Desaguliers in 1719, he was again Grand Master in 1720. During this time he compiled The Regulations of the Free-masons, which was printed in 1722 or 1723. He was deputy Master in 1725, when the Duke of Richmond was both Master of the Lodge and Grand Master.

== Family ==
Payne and his wife Anne Martha Batson lived in St Stephen's Court, New Palace Yard, Westminster.

Payne's brother Thomas Payne (23 December 1689 – 1744) was rector of Holme Lacy Herefordshire for Frances Scudamore wife of Henry Scudamore, 3rd Duke of Beaufort and later the wife of Charles FitzRoy-Scudamore. Thomas's nine recorded children included Frances Compton (later Amyand) Countess of Northampton and Catherine Seymour, wife of Lord Francis Seymour, Dean of Wells.

== Sources ==
- The First Grand Lodge
- 10,000 Famous Freemasons; W R Denslow
- History of the Grand Lodge of England 1723-1760

Masonic offices
Preceded by Anthony Sayer	Grand Master of the Premier; Grand Lodge of England; 1718–1719	Succeeded by John Desaguliers
Preceded by John Desaguliers	Grand Master of the Premier; Grand Lodge of England; 1720–1721	Succeeded by The Duke of Montagu
