= Premier Grand Lodge of England =

Masonic Grand Lodge in London, England (1717–1813)

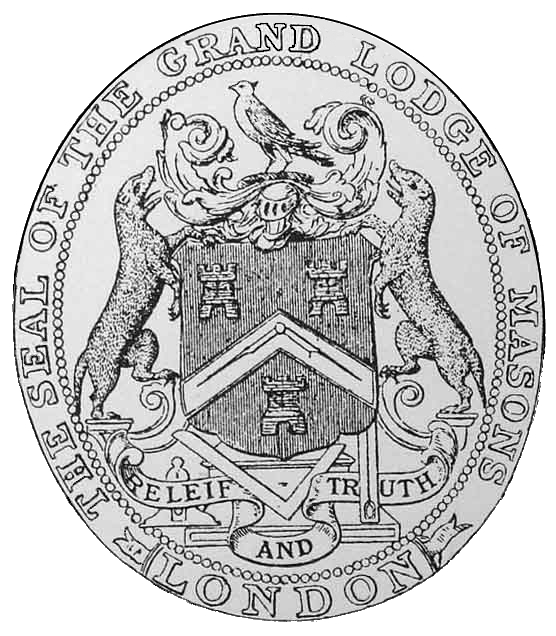
- Seal
- Successor: United Grand Lodge of England
- Formation: 24 June 1717
- Dissolved: 27 December 1813
- Type: Freemasonic Grand Lodge
- Headquarters: London, England
- Location: England and Wales
- Grand Master: Anthony Sayer (first); Duke of Sussex (last)

The Premier Grand Lodge of England (formerly known as the Grand Lodge of London and Westminster) was a Masonic grand lodge formed on 24 June 1717 in London, England. Originally concerned with the practice of Freemasonry in London and Westminster, it soon became known as the Grand Lodge of England. Because it was the first Masonic grand lodge to be created, modern convention now calls it the Premier Grand Lodge of England in order to distinguish it from the Most Ancient and Honourable Society of Free and Accepted Masons according to the Old Constitutions, usually referred to as the Ancient Grand Lodge of England, and the Grand Lodge of All England Meeting at York. It existed until 1813, when it united with the Ancient Grand Lodge of England to create the United Grand Lodge of England.

The basic principles of the Grand Lodge of England were inspired by the ideal of tolerance and universal understanding of the Enlightenment and by the Scientific Revolution of the 17th century.

== Foundation ==
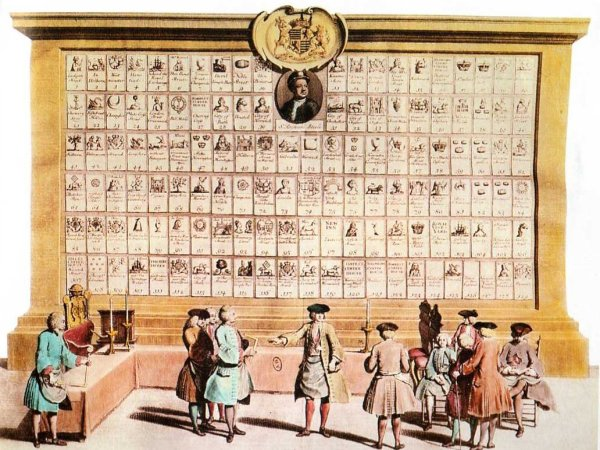
Table of lodges affiliated to the Grand Lodge, 1735.

The Grand Lodge was founded shortly after George I, the first Hanoverian king of the Kingdom of Great Britain, ascended to the throne on 1 August 1714 and the end of the first Jacobite rising of 1715.

Officially, the Grand Lodge of England was founded in London on St. John the Baptist's day, 24 June 1717, when four existing Lodges gathered at the Goose and Gridiron Ale-house in St. Paul's Church-yard in London and constituted themselves a Grand Lodge. The four lodges had previously met together in 1716 at the Apple-Tree Tavern, "and having put into the Chair the oldest Master Mason (now the Master of a Lodge), they constituted themselves a Grand Lodge pro Tempore in due form." It was at that meeting in 1716 that they resolved to hold the Annual Assembly and Feast and then choose a Grand Master from among themselves, which they did the following year. All four lodges were simply named after the public houses where they were accustomed to meet, at the Goose and Gridiron Ale-house in St. Paul's Church-yard (Lodge now called Lodge of Antiquity No. 2); the Crown Ale-house in Parker's Lane off Drury Lane; the Apple-Tree Tavern in Charles Street, Covent Garden (Lodge now called Lodge of Fortitude and Old Cumberland No. 12); and the Rummer and Grapes Tavern in Channel Row, Westminster (Lodge now called Royal Somerset House and Inverness Lodge No. IV).

While the three London lodges were mainly operative lodges, the Rummer and Grapes, by the Palace of Westminster, appears to have been primarily a lodge of accepted and speculative gentlemen masons.

Little is known of Anthony Sayer, the first Grand Master, but the next, George Payne, rose to a high position within the Commissioners of Taxes. Payne served as Grand Master twice, in 1718–19, and 1720–21. The year in between was taken by John Theophilus Desaguliers, a scientist, clergyman, and a pupil of Newton. Thereafter, every Grand Master was a member of the nobility, although in these early years, it is unlikely that they were anything more than figureheads. The intention was to raise the public profile of the society, which evidently succeeded. In 1725, aside from London Lodges, the minutes of Grand Lodge show lodges at Bath, Bristol, Norwich, Chichester, Chester, Reading, Gosport, Carmarthen, Salford, and Warwick, and embryonic Provincial Grand Lodges in Cheshire and South Wales. The Grand Lodge was outgrowing London.

== The Book of Constitutions ==
George Payne took it upon himself to write the General Regulations of a Free Mason [sic], which were recited at his second installation as Grand Master in 1720. Very little is known of the period from 1717 to 1721, due to lack of minutes and written material, but sometime during this period the Revd. Dr. James Anderson was either commissioned or took it upon himself to write The Constitutions of the Free-Masons containing the History, Charges, Regulations, & of that most Ancient and Right Worshipful Fraternity: For use of the Lodges. According to Anderson, he was commissioned to digest the old Gothic Constitutions of Freemasonry. The book was submitted for approval to Grand Lodge, and published by order of the Grand Master in 1723, with the addition of the outgoing Grand Masters method of constituting a new Masonic Lodge. It started with Desagulier's dedication to the previous Grand Master, John Montagu, 2nd Duke of Montagu. There followed a long "Historical" introduction, tracing Freemasonry back to biblical times, a set of six "Charges" (masonic obligations), an expanded version of Payne's Regulations, Grand Master Wharton's method of constituting a new lodge, and finally a section of songs. For the first time, all of Freemasonry, except for the ritual, was available in a printed book. Anderson received no remuneration from the pocket editions which started to appear in the 1730s, which may have inspired the revised edition of 1738.

== Expansion and conflict ==
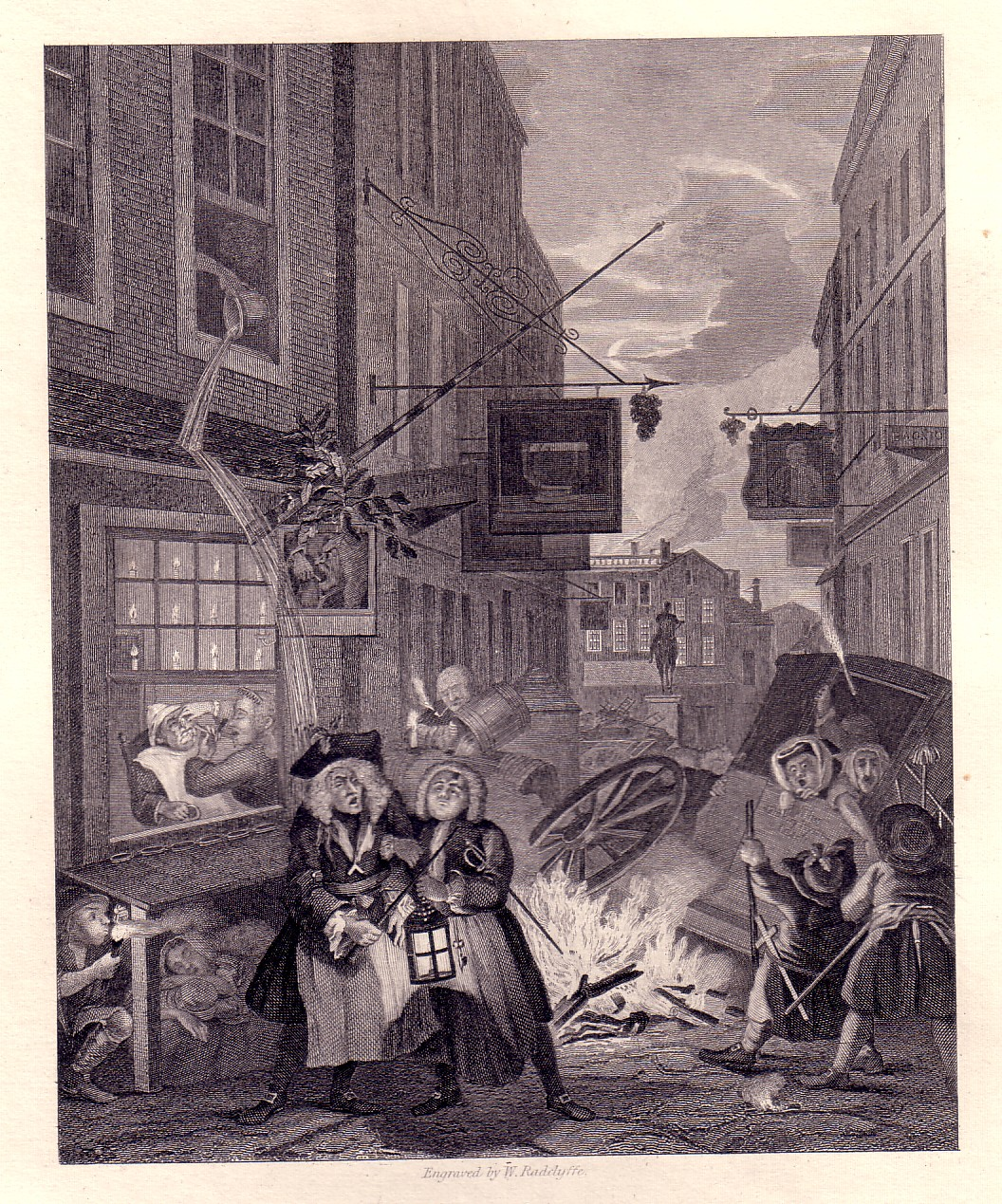
Hogarth's Night The drunk receiving the contents of a bucket is wearing a masonic master's jewel, and his servant's sword indicates a tyler. The man with the mop may be an allusion to the Tyler erasing chalk marks from the lodge floor. The Rummer and Grapes on the inn sign depict one of the four lodges which founded Grand Lodge

The new Grand Lodge was evidently not immediately attractive to the older "St. John's" or independent lodges, who already found much to dislike about the organisation. It had been their custom to mark the lodge out in chalk, which would be erased with a mop and bucket. This began to be replaced with tape and thin metal letters, hence an advertisement in a London newspaper in 1726 for a lecture on "Ante-Diluvian Masonry. Showing what innovations have lately been introduced by the Doctor and some other of the Moderns, with their Tape, Jacks, and Movable Letters, Blazing Stars, etc., to the great indignity of the Mop and Pail."

The second quarter of the 18th century saw the London organisation flourish as the Grand Lodge of England. However, the rapidity of growth saw some lodges fail in their first year. A crop of disaffected ex-masons brought a few published exposures, the most successful being Pritchard's "Masonry Dissected", in 1730. As this contained a recognisable representation of all three degrees, with the secrets that would supposedly ensure admission to a Masonic Lodge, Grand Lodge made a few changes to their ritual and password which took them out of step with the new Grand Lodges in Ireland and Scotland. This also widened the gulf between a relatively new Grand Lodge, and many unaffiliated lodges in the country, who viewed with extreme suspicion any departure from the "Ancient Landmarks".

When, in 1721, the Grand Lodge secured John Montagu, 2nd Duke of Montagu, as their first noble Grand Master, a foot parade was staged at his installation. This became an annual event, with later processions being conducted in carriages. As every notable admission into the fraternity was heralded in print, an aura of elitism attracted scorn, and the annual processions attracted ridicule and finally, physical parody. In the 1740s, being followed down the road by the "Scald Miserable Masons" became too much, and Masonic Processions were banned by Grand Lodge in 1747.

== Ancients and Moderns ==
In 1751, a group of unaffiliated lodges of mainly Irish membership formed the Grand Committee of what would become the Most Ancient and Honourable Society of Free and Accepted Masons according to the Old Constitutions, now known as the Ancients. This society, which adhered to what it believed to be an older and more authentic ritual than the original Grand Lodge, grew rapidly under the influence of Laurence Dermott, who was Grand Secretary from 1752 to 1771, and deputy Grand Master intermittently thereafter. (As the Grand Masters of the period were mainly noble figureheads, it was the Deputy Grand Master who actually directed the Grand Lodge.) It also benefited from early recognition by the Grand Lodges of Ireland and Scotland.

Dermott wrote a new Book of Constitutions for his Grand Lodge, entitled Ahiman Rezon. Published in 1756, the first edition expressed a wish for reconciliation with the other Grand Lodge. The second edition, in 1764, turned on their "unconstitutional fopperies". The Premier Grand Lodge were already referred to as the "Moderns", and Dermott made sure that the epithet stuck, his own Grand Lodge becoming known to history as the Ancients. Succeeding editions heaped ever more scorn on the Premier Grand Lodge. Dermott's prose was bitingly sarcastic, and witty. Ahiman Rezon sold well.

Also in 1764, a lodge of Edinburgh masons, who had only joined the previous year, seceded to the Moderns. These were instrumental in the formation of the first Grand Chapter of Royal Arch masonry. Among their members was William Preston, who within a decade, had become a valued writer and lecturer on Masonry. The success in the 1770s of Preston's lectures, and his book, entitled "Illustrations of Masonry", led to his appointment as assistant Grand Secretary, and his election as Master of the Lodge of Antiquity, formerly the Goose and Gridiron, and reputedly the oldest lodge in the constitution.

Preston's position as Assistant Grand Secretary enabled him to correspond with the Grand Lodge of Scotland, casting doubt on the regularity of the Ancients, and attempting to sever the ties between the Ancients and the Scots. This was a predictable failure, and further poisoned the relationship between the two London Grand Lodges. The huge influx of new masons at Preston's Antiquity led to discontent among the longer serving lodge members, and he also managed to fall out with Grand Secretary Heseltine. When he and a few others walked to lodge from church in their regalia one Sunday, his enemies made the incident into an unauthorised procession. Preston unrepentantly cited Antiquity's precedence as a founding "time immemorial" lodge, and was expelled, taking half of Antiquity with him. They allied themselves with the Grand Lodge of All England at York, and for ten years, from 1779 to 1789, became the Grand Lodge of All England South of the River Trent.

Whilst the new Grand Chapter had been set up with the Grand Master, Lord Blayney, at its head, Grand Secretary Heseltine continued to write to Provincial Lodges assuring them that Royal Arch masonry had no part in regular masonry, although he was himself one of the founders of Grand Chapter. Thomas Dunckerley, the Grand Superintendent of the new Grand Chapter, had considerable success in spreading Royal Arch, Mark, and Templar masonry in the Southern provinces of the Moderns, and assisted Heseltine and Preston in starting to move Freemasonry out of inns and into dedicated masonic buildings. The official attitude towards the Royal Arch remained antagonistic, which proved difficult as the two Grand Lodges moved towards union in the next century.

== Union with the Ancients ==
Relations between the two major bodies in English Freemasonry experienced a thaw in the 1790s. It is hard not to correlate this with the death of Dermott in 1791, and the progressive editing out of his vitriol from Ahiman Rezon, but other factors contributed. John Murray, 4th Duke of Atholl became Grand Master of the Ancients, and Francis Rawdon-Hastings, Earl of Moira became Acting Grand Master of the Moderns (the Grand Master being the Prince of Wales). Neither of these noblemen was content to be a mere figurehead, and in 1799 they were forced to act together, in company with representatives of the Grand Lodge of Scotland, to keep Freemasonry from being outlawed. Fear of Napoleon's spies prompted the Unlawful Societies Act, prohibiting any association bound by secret oaths, and the united representations of the three Grand Lodges induced the Government to make a specific exception of the lodges of Freemasons.

Progress towards union remained slow, until the Moderns formed the "Lodge of Promulgation" in 1809, for the purpose of reverting their ritual to a point where it was in step with the Ancients, the Scots and the Irish. One of their resolutions was that the ceremony of installation (of a new master of a lodge) was part of "Antient" masonry. They then obliged their own uninstalled masters and the masters of the London lodges to undergo the ritual in three meetings during December 1810 and January 1811. That year, the Moderns formally told the Ancients that they had resolved to return to the older ritual, and the process of union began. At the end of 1812, the Earl of Moira resigned to take up the post of Governor of India, and the Duke of Sussex became Grand Master on the resignation of his brother, the Prince Regent. On 1 December 1813, the Duke of Atholl resigned the leadership of the Ancients. The Duke of Kent, the older brother of Sussex and the father of Queen Victoria took over. He had already united the Ancients and Moderns in Canada. He simply merged the lodges of the Moderns with the nearest lodge of the Ancients. In other words, he abolished the Canadian Moderns. So it was that on the Feast of St. John the Evangelist, 27 December 1813, the two English Grand Lodges came together to form the United Grand Lodge of England, with the Duke of Sussex as Grand Master.

== Grand Masters ==
- 1717: Anthony Sayer
- 1718: George Payne
- 1719: John Theophilus Desaguliers
- 1720: George Payne
- 1721–1723: John Montagu, 2nd Duke of Montagu
- 1723: Philip Wharton, 1st Duke of Wharton
- 1723–1724: Francis Scott, Earl of Dalkeith
- 1724: Charles Lennox, 2nd Duke of Richmond
- 1725: James Hamilton, Lord Paisley
- 1726: William O'Brian, Earl of Inchiquin
- 1727: Lord Colerane
- 1728: James King, 4th Baron Kingston
- 1730: Duke of Norfolk
- 1731: Lord Lovell
- 1732: Viscount Montagu
- 1733: Earl of Strathmore
- 1734: Earl of Crawford
- 1735: Lord Weymouth
- 1736: Earl of Loudoun
- 1737: Earl of Darnley
- 1738: Marquis of Carnarvon
- 1739: Robert Raymond, 2nd Baron Raymond
- 1740: John Keith, 3rd Earl of Kintore
- 1741: Earl of Morton
- 1742–1744: Lord Ward
- 1745–1747: James Cranstoun, 6th Lord Cranstoun
- 1747–1752: William Byron, 5th Baron Byron
- 1752–1753: Lord Carysfort
- 1754–1757: Marquis of Carnarvon
- 1757–1762: Lord Aberdour
- 1762–1764: Earl Ferrers
- 1764–1767: Cadwallader Blayney, 9th Baron Blayney
- 1767–1772: Duke of Beaufort
- 1772–1777: Lord Petre
- 1777–1782: Duke of Manchester
- 1782–1790: Duke of Cumberland
- 1792–1812: Prince of Wales
- 1790–1812: Francis Rawdon-Hastings, Earl of Moira (Acting Grand Master)
- 1813: Prince Augustus Frederick, Duke of Sussex

== See also ==
- History of Freemasonry
- Observant Freemasonry
