= Anthony Sayer =

Grand Master of the Premier Grand Lodge of England from 1717 to 1718

- Mezzotint portrait by John Faber the Younger after Joseph Highmore

Grand Master of the Premier Grand Lodge of England
- In office 24 June 1717 – 24 June 1718
- Succeeded by: George Payne

Personal details
- Born: c. 1672
- Died: January 1742 (aged 69–70) St. Giles in the Fields, London, England
- Resting place: Covent Garden Church

Anthony Sayer (c. 1672 – January 1742) was an English gentleman who served as the Grand Master of the Premier Grand Lodge of England from 1717 to 1718.

== Biography ==
=== Freemasonry ===
The founding of the Grand Lodge of London and Westminster on 24 June 1717, at the Goose and Gridiron alehouse, is widely recognized as the birth of organized modern Freemasonry. Anthony Sayer’s election as the first Grand Master marked a pivotal moment, transitioning Freemasonry from operative stone-cutting guilds into the speculative fraternal organization it is known as today.

=== Death ===
Sayer died at age 69 or 70 in January 1742. Masons led the procession from the Shakespeare's Head Tavern, in Covent Garden Piazza, to Sayer's final resting place in Covent Garden Church.

Masonic offices
Preceded by New office	Grand Master of the Premier Grand Lodge of England; 1717–1718	Succeeded by George Payne
