= United Grand Lodge of England =

Freemason lodge in England

- Coat of arms
- Established: 27 December 1813 (212 years ago)
- Location: London, WC2
- Region served: England and Wales
- Grand Master: Prince Edward, Duke of Kent
- Website: www.ugle.org.uk

The United Grand Lodge of England (UGLE) is the governing Masonic lodge for the majority of freemasons in England, Wales, and some Commonwealth of Nations. Claiming descent from the Masonic Grand Lodge formed 24 June 1717 at the Goose & Gridiron Tavern in London, it is considered to be the oldest Masonic Grand Lodge in the world, together with the Grand Lodge of Scotland, and the Grand Lodge of Ireland.

== History ==
=== Moderns and Ancients in English Freemasonry ===
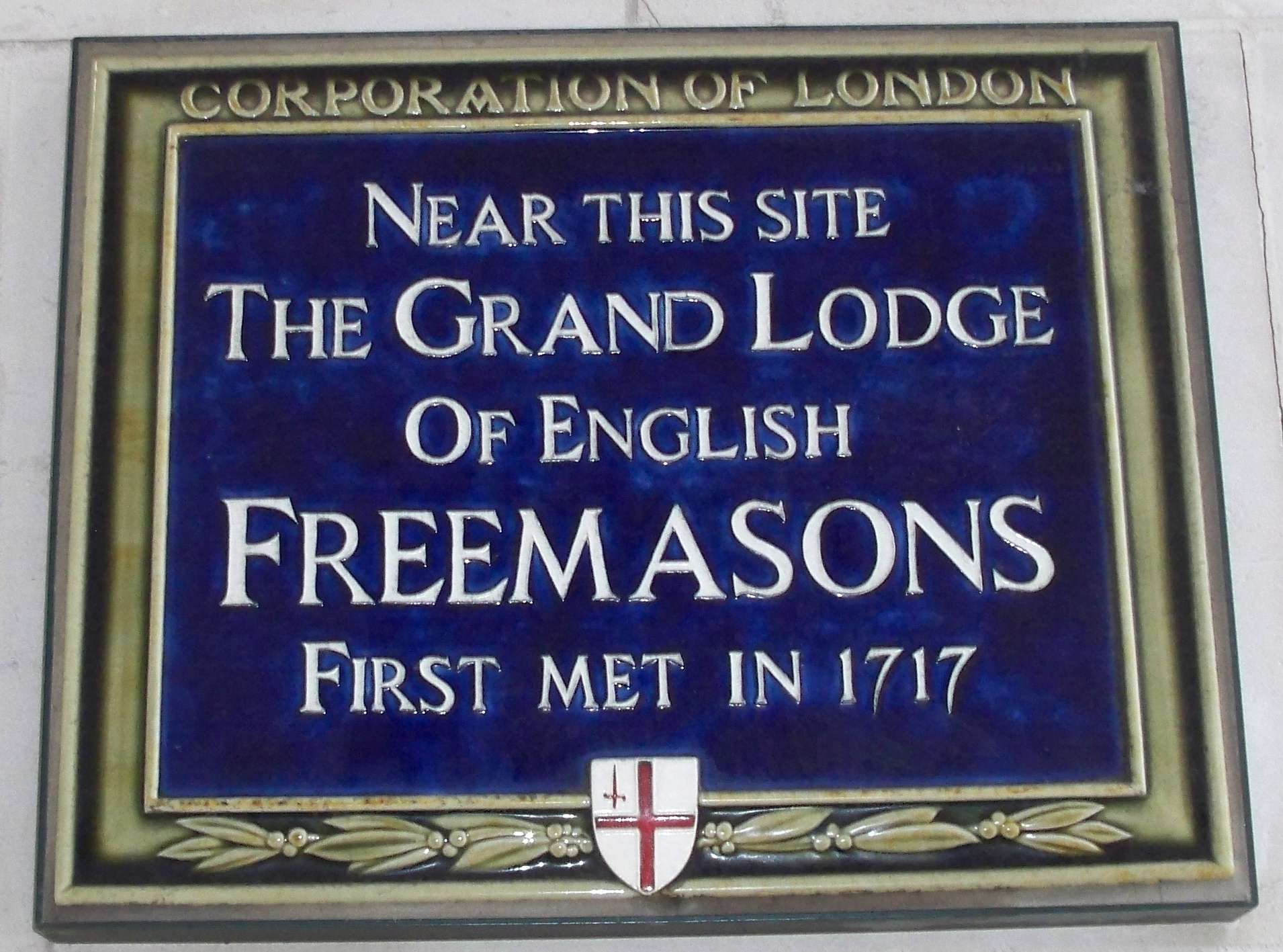
The blue plaque marking the site where the first Grand Lodge was formed.

Prior to 1717 there were Freemasons' lodges in England, Scotland, and Ireland, with the earliest known admission of non-operative masons being in Scotland. On St John's Day, 24 June 1717, three existing London lodges and a Westminster lodge held a joint dinner at the Goose and Gridiron alehouse in St Paul's Churchyard, elected Anthony Sayer to the chair as Grand Master, and called themselves the Grand Lodge of London and Westminster. The City of London Corporation has erected a Blue Plaque near the location. Little is known of Sayer save that he was described as a Gentleman (a man of independent means) when he became Grand Master, but later fell on hard times, receiving money from the Grand Lodge charity fund.

Historian Marsha Keith Schuchard notes that the Whig administration of England organised the Grand Lodge as a Hanoverian-loyalist counter to the Jacobite rising of 1715, since the Whigs were concerned at the previous Jacobite influence in Freemason lodges. The Freemasonry that predominated in Hanoverian England was hence closely linked with Whiggism.

In 1718 Sayer was succeeded by George Payne, a successful Civil Servant. The society then passed into the care of John Theophilus Desaguliers, a scientist and clergyman, then back to Payne. In 1721, the Grand Lodge managed to obtain a nobleman, the Duke of Montagu to preside as Grand Master, and so was able to establish itself as an authoritative regulatory body, and began meeting on a quarterly basis. This resulted in lodges outside London becoming affiliated, accepting sequentially numbered warrants conferring seniority over later applicants.

In 1723, by authority of the Grand Lodge, James Anderson published the Constitutions of Masonry for the purposes of regulating the craft and establishing the Grand Lodge's authority to warrant Lodges to meet. The book includes a fanciful history of the Craft, which nevertheless contains much interesting material.

Throughout the early years of the new Grand Lodge there were any number of Masons and lodges that never affiliated with the new Grand Lodge. These unaffiliated Masons and their Lodges were referred to as "Old Masons", or "St John Masons", and "St John Lodges".

During the 1730s and 1740s antipathy increased between the London Grand Lodge and the Grand Lodges of Ireland and Scotland. Irish and Scots Masons visiting and living in London considered the London Grand Lodge to have deviated substantially from the ancient practices of the Craft. As a result, these Masons felt a stronger kinship with the unaffiliated London Lodges. The aristocratic nature of the London Grand Lodge and its members alienated other Masons causing them also to identify with the unaffiliated Lodges.

On 17 July 1751, representatives of five Lodges gathered at the Turk's Head Tavern, in Greek Street, Soho, London and formed a rival Grand Lodge: "The Grand Lodge of England According to the Old Institutions". They considered that they practised a more ancient and therefore purer form of Masonry, and called their Grand Lodge The Ancients' Grand Lodge. They called those affiliated to the Premier Grand Lodge, by the pejorative epithet The Moderns. These two unofficial names stuck.

The creation of Lodges followed the development of the Empire, with all three home Grand Lodges warranting Lodges around the world, including the Americas, India and Africa, from the 1730s.

=== Formation of the United Grand Lodge of England ===
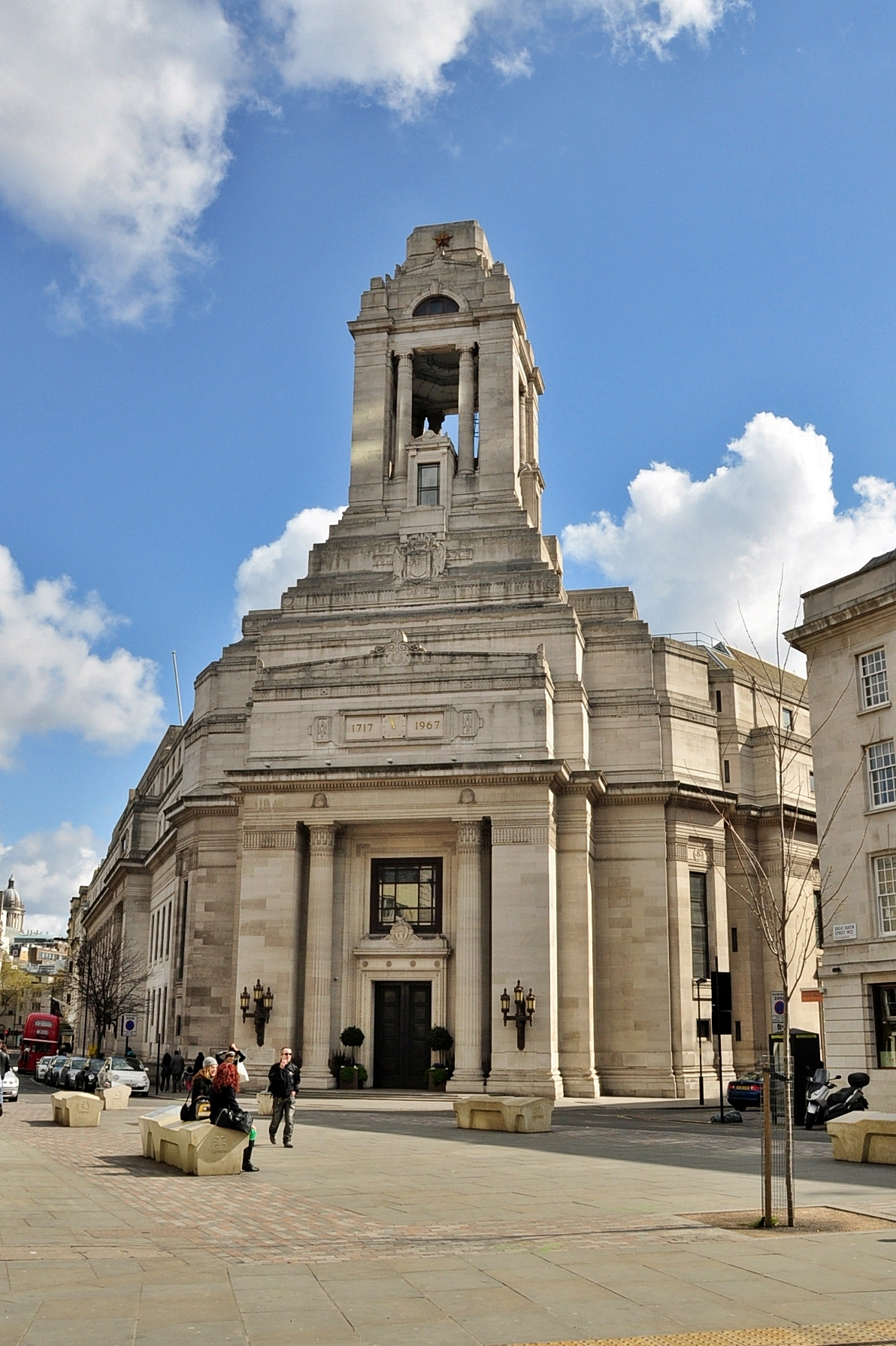
Freemasons' Hall, London is the headquarters of the United Grand Lodge of England

In 1809 the Moderns appointed a "Lodge of Promulgation" to return their own ritual to regularity with Scotland, Ireland and especially the Ancients. In 1811 both Grand Lodges appointed Commissioners; and over the next two years, articles of Union were negotiated and agreed upon. In January 1813 the Duke of Sussex became Grand Master of the Moderns on the resignation of his brother, the Prince Regent; and in December 1813 another brother, Duke of Kent became Grand Master of the Antients. On 27 December 1813 the United Grand Lodge of England ("UGLE") was constituted at Freemasons' Hall, London with the Duke of Sussex (younger son of King George III) as Grand Master. A Lodge of Reconciliation was formed to reconcile the rituals worked under the two former Grand Lodges.

The new Grand Master had high hopes for Freemasonry, having a theory that it was pre-Christian and could serve the cause of humanity as a universal religion. However, his autocratic dealings with ordinary lodges won him few friends outside London, and sparked open rebellion and a new Grand Lodge of Wigan in the North West. Within Grand Lodge, opposition centred on Masonic Charity. Robert Crucefix launched the Freemason's Quarterly Review to promote charity to keep Freemasons from the workhouse, and to engage masons in the broader argument for social reform. The Earl of Zetland's complacent and inept management of Grand Lodge played into the hands of the reformers, and by the end of the 1870s English Freemasonry had become a perfect expression of the aspirations of the enlightened middle classes.

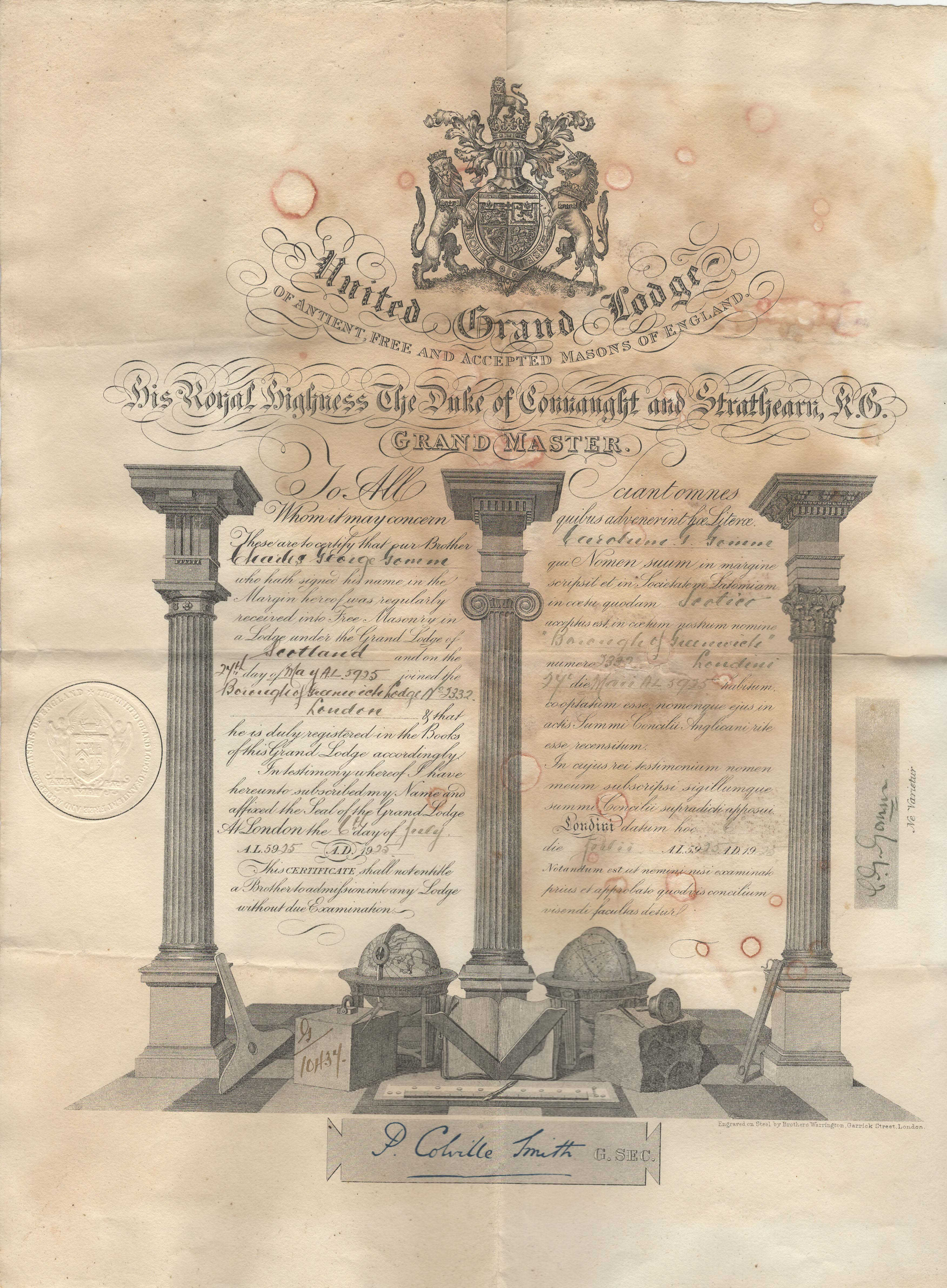
Grand Lodge certificate of the United Grand Lodge of England, issued 6 July 1925, when the Duke of Connaught and Strathearn was the Grand Master

=== Freemasonry in contemporary times ===
In response to conspiracy theories about Freemasons and generally hostile views gaining new life, due to the works of Stephen Knight and Martin Short, the United Grand Lodge of England began to change the way it dealt with the general public and the media from the mid-1990s, emphasizing a new "openness." This presentation was summed up by Provincial Secretary of East Lancashire, Alan Garnett who declared, "we're not a secret society or a society with secrets, but we are a private society." Lodges across England and Wales began holding open days, to allow the general public to see what they do. Freemasons' Hall, London and the Library and Museum of Freemasonry also opened to the general public, including guided tours.

Today, the United Grand Lodge of England or Grand Lodge currently has over 200,000 members meeting in over 6,800 Lodges, organised into a number of subordinate Provincial Grand Lodges which are approximately equivalent to the historic counties of England.

- Lodges meeting in London (an area generally within a 10-mile radius of Freemasons' Hall) are, with six exceptions, administered by the Metropolitan Grand Lodge of London, headed by the Metropolitan Grand Master.
- Lodges meeting outside London, and within England, Wales, the Isle of Man and the Channel Islands, are grouped into 48 Provincial Grand Lodges (UGLE), each headed by a Provincial Grand Master.
- Lodges that meet outside England, Wales, the Isle of Man and the Channel Islands are grouped into 33 District Grand Lodges, each headed by a District Grand Master.
- Five Groups (i.e.: currently too small to make up a District), each headed by a Grand Inspector.
- Six Lodges in London and 12 Lodges abroad that are directly administered by The Grand Secretary's office at Freemasons' Hall.

== Grand Officers ==
The United Grand Lodge of England appoints officers to senior administrative or ceremonial rank from amongst its membership. Different offices have different responsibilities and may hold different lengths of tenure and carry with them different nominal prefixes.

At the head of UGLE is the Grand Master, who appoints the grand officers of UGLE. These appointees are then invested at an annual investiture each year. Once an active grand officer has finished their tenure in office, they will then become a "past" grand officer normally of the same office that they held.

It is, however, also common to be directly appointed as a past grand rank in recognition of considerable service to UGLE without having held an active grand rank.

Order of Precedence	Grand Rank	Nominal Prefix
1	The Grand Master	M W Bro
2	The Pro Grand Master	M W Bro
3	Past Grand Masters	M W Bro
4	Past Pro Grand Masters	M W Bro
5	Deputy Grand Master	R W Bro
6	Past Deputy Grand Masters	R W Bro
7	Assistant Grand Masters	R W Bro
8	Past Assistant Grand Masters	R W Bro
9	Metropolitan Grand Masters	R W Bro
10	Past Metropolitan Grand Masters	R W Bro
11	Provincial and District Grand Masters	R W Bro
12	Past Provincial and District Grand Masters	R W Bro
13	Senior Grand Warden	R W Bro
14	Past Senior Grand Wardens	R W Bro
15	Junior Grand Warden	R W Bro
16	Past Junior Grand Wardens	R W Bro
17	President of the Board of General Purposes	R W Bro
18	Past Presidents of the Board of General Purposes	R W Bro
19	Grand Chaplain	V W Bro
20	Past Grand Chaplains	V W Bro
21	Grand Registrar	V W Bro
22	Past Grand Registrars	V W Bro
23	Grand Secretary	V W Bro
24	Past Grand Secretaries	V W Bro
25	Grand Chancellor	V W Bro
26	Past Grand Chancellors	V W Bro
27	President of the Masonic Charitable Foundation	V W Bro
28	Past Presidents of the Masonic Charitable Foundation	V W Bro
29	Deputy President of the Board of General Purposes	V W Bro
30	Past Deputy Presidents of the Board of General Purposes	V W Bro
31	Deputy President of the Masonic Charitable Foundation	V W Bro
32	Past Deputy Presidents of the Masonic Charitable Foundation	V W Bro
33	Past Presidents of the Grand Charity, the Royal Masonic Trust for Girls and Boys, the Royal Masonic Benevolent Institution and the Masonic Samaritan Fund	V W Bro
34	Grand Director of Ceremonies	V W Bro
35	Past Grand Directors of Ceremonies	V W Bro
36	Grand Sword Bearer	V W Bro
37	Past Grand Sword Bearers	V W Bro
38	Grand Superintendent of Works	V W Bro
39	Past Grand Superintendents of Works	V W Bro
40	Grand Inspectors	V W Bro
41	Past Grand Inspectors	V W Bro
42	Grand Treasurer	W Bro
43	Past Grand Treasurers	W Bro
44	Deputy Grand Chaplain	W Bro
45	Past Deputy Grand Chaplains	W Bro
46	Deputy Grand Registrar	W Bro
47	Past Deputy Grand Registrars	W Bro
48	Deputy Grand Secretaries	W Bro
49	Past Deputy Grand Secretaries	W Bro
50	Deputy Grand Chancellor	W Bro
51	Past Deputy Grand Chancellors	W Bro
52	Deputy Grand Directors of Ceremonies	W Bro
53	Past Deputy Grand Directors of Ceremonies	W Bro
54	Deputy Grand Sword Bearer	W Bro
55	Past Deputy Grand Sword Bearers	W Bro
56	Deputy Grand Superintendents of Works	W Bro
57	Past Deputy Grand Superintendents of Works	W Bro
58	Deputy Grand Treasurer	W Bro
58a	Past Deputy Grand Treasurers	W Bro
59	Past Grand Orators	W Bro
60	Senior Grand Deacons	W Bro
61	Past Senior Grand Deacons	W Bro
62	Junior Grand Deacons	W Bro
63	Past Junior Grand Deacons	W Bro
64	Assistant Grand Chaplains	W Bro
65	Past Assistant Grand Chaplains	W Bro
66	Assistant Grand Registrars	W Bro
67	Past Assistant Grand Registrars	W Bro
68	Assistant Grand Secretaries	W Bro
69	Past Assistant Grand Secretaries	W Bro
70	Assistant Grand Chancellors	W Bro
71	Past Assistant Grand Chancellors	W Bro
72	Assistant Grand Directors of Ceremonies	W Bro
73	Past Assistant Grand Directors of Ceremonies	W Bro
74	Assistant Grand Sword Bearers	W Bro
75	Past Assistant Grand Sword Bearers	W Bro
76	Assistant Grand Superintendents of Works	W Bro
77	Past Assistant Grand Superintendents of Works	W Bro
78	Grand Organist	W Bro
79	Past Grand Organists	W Bro
80	Grand Standard Bearers	W Bro
81	Past Grand Standard Bearers	W Bro
82	Assistant Grand Standard Bearers	W Bro
83	Past Assistant Grand Standard Bearers	W Bro
84	Deputy Grand Organist	W Bro
85	Past Deputy Grand Organists	W Bro
86	Grand Pursuivant	W Bro
87	Past Grand Pursuivants	W Bro
88	Assistant Grand Pursuivants	W Bro
89	Past Assistant Grand Pursuivants	W Bro
90	The Grand Stewards for the year*	W Bro
91	Grand Tyler	W Bro
92	Past Grand Tylers	W Bro

=== Grand Masters ===
Years Active	Grand Master
1813–1843	Prince Augustus Frederick, Duke of Sussex
1844–1870	Thomas Dundas, 2nd Earl of Zetland
1870–1874	George Robinson, 3rd Earl de Grey and 2nd Earl of Ripon (later 1st Marquess of Ripon from 1871
1874–1901	Albert Edward, Prince of Wales (Later King Edward VII from 1901)
1901–1939	Prince Arthur, Duke of Connaught and Strathearn
1939–1942	Prince George, Duke of Kent
1942–1947	Henry Lascelles, 6th Earl of Harewood
1947–1950	Edward Cavendish, 10th Duke of Devonshire
1951–1967	Roger Lumley, 11th Earl of Scarbrough
1967–present	Prince Edward, Duke of Kent

=== Pro Grand Masters ===
When the Grand Master is a member of the royal family it is customary to appoint a Pro Grand Master. The Pro Grand Master fills the role of the Grand Master when he is not available due to his royal duties. It is distinct from the Deputy Grand Master who acts as the Grand Master's deputy rather than as acting Grand Master.

Albert Edward, Prince of Wales

- Henry Herbert, 4th Earl of Carnarvon (1874–1890)
- Edward Bootle-Wilbraham, 1st Earl of Lathom (1891–1898)
- William Amherst, 3rd Earl Amherst (1898–1901)

Prince Arthur, Duke of Connaught and Strathearn

- William Amherst, 3rd Earl Amherst (1901–1908)
- Oliver Russell, 2nd Baron Ampthill (1908–1935)

Prince Edward, Duke of Kent

- Roger Lumley, 11th Earl of Scarbrough (1967–1969)
- William Cadogan, 7th Earl Cadogan (1969–1982)
- Fiennes Cornwallis, 3rd Baron Cornwallis (1982–1991)
- Barry Maxwell, 12th Baron Farnham (1991–2001)
- Spencer Compton, 7th Marquess of Northampton (2001–2009)
- Peter Lowndes (2009–2022)
- Jonathan Spence, DL (2022–present)

=== Grand Secretaries ===
- 1813–1838 William Henry White and Edward Harper (Joint Secretaries)
- 1838–1857 William Henry White
- 1880–1891 Colonel Shadwell Henry Clerke
- 1891–1917: Sir Edward Letchworth
- 1917–1937: Sir Philip Colville Smith, CVO
- 1937–1958: Sir Sydney Arthur White, KCVO
- 1958–1980: Sir James Wilfrid Stubbs, KCVO, TD
- 1980–1998: Commander Michael Bernard Shepley Higham, CVO
- 1998–2002: Jim Daniel
- 2002–2006: Robert Morrow
- 2007–2016: Nigel Brown
- 2016–2018: Brigadier Willie Shackell, CBE
- 2018–2022: David Staples
- 2022–present: Adrian Marsh

== Media and communications ==
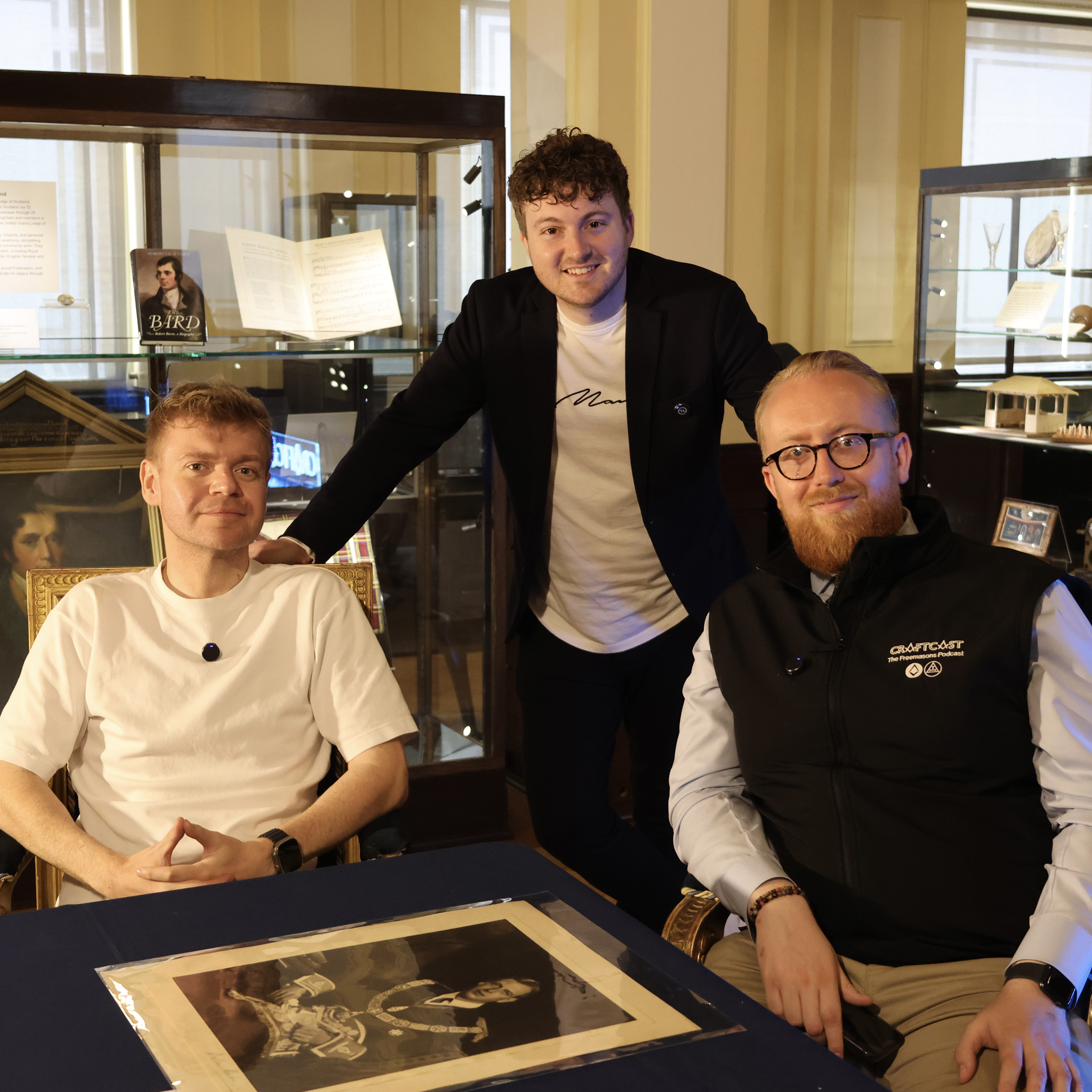
The presenters of Craftcast. Left to right — James Dalton, Stephen Whatley and Shaun Butler.

In October 2022, the United Grand Lodge of England launched an official podcast titled "Craftcast: The Freemasons Podcast". The show is presented by three Freemasons from across the UGLE constitution:

1. Shaun Butler, Director of Membership & Communications at UGLE
2. James Dalton, Past Provincial Deputy Grand Director of Ceremonies in the Province of Warwickshire
3. Stephen Whatley, District Grand Communications Officer in the District of Gibraltar

=== Background ===
Craftcast was created by UGLE as part of an effort to open a new channel of communication about Freemasonry with both members and the general public, and to address common public misconceptions about the organisation. The three hosts — Shaun Butler (aged 29 at launch), James Dalton (32), and Stephen Whatley (22) — were selected in part to give the podcast a younger member's perspective on the Craft.

=== Content and style ===
Each episode of Craftcast typically follows a conversational, interview-driven format. The three hosts discuss a chosen topic related to Freemasonry — its history, rituals, charitable work, public perception, or contemporary issues facing the fraternity — and are frequently joined by guests drawn from across UGLE and its constituent lodges, including senior office-holders such as the Pro Grand Master.

Recurring formats and segments have included:

1. Guest interviews with Freemasons holding notable roles within UGLE, such as museum curators, charity organisers, and senior officers.
2. A recurring Word Explainer segment unpacking Masonic terminology for newer members and curious listeners.
3. Listener Q&A episodes addressing audience questions and misconceptions about Freemasonry.
4. Location-based episodes recorded away from the studio, including visits to provincial Grand Lodges and charitable events.
5. A live recording held at Freemasons' Hall in London before an audience, following UGLE's inaugural "Light Blues" Communication.
6. Coverage of historical topics, such as an episode examining claims of Masonic involvement in the Jack the Ripper case.

Beginning in later series, episodes were also released in video form on a dedicated YouTube channel, in addition to standard audio distribution.

=== Distribution ===
Craftcast is distributed as a standard audio podcast across major platforms, including Spotify, Apple Podcasts, Amazon Music, iHeartRadio, and Podbean, and is also produced as video content on YouTube. Episodes are released on a regular schedule, described by UGLE as monthly during some series.

=== Reception ===
Within 24 hours of its first episode being released, the podcast reportedly reached the UK Top 100 on Apple Podcasts and the Top 20 in the Society & Culture category. As of late 2025, the show had released more than five series (referred to as "seasons") and over 60 episodes, and had expanded to include video episodes on YouTube.

== Opposition ==
=== Politics ===
In English politics, freemasonry has often been criticised by those associated with the Labour Party and trade unionism, because of a perception that freemasonry is aligned with the Conservative Party. The Labour Party became the second party of the United Kingdom from 1922 onward and stood on a platform of representing working-class interests, while the Conservatives and Liberals were largely based in the middle-class and upper-class (similar to Freemasonry). After a number of Labour MPs were blackballed from joining Masonic lodges, the Prince of Wales who was concerned by the potential conflict, intervened and had the New Welcome Lodge created for Labour members in 1929. Herbert Morrison claimed that his 1935 bid for the Labour leadership was sabotaged by Lodge members who preferred first Arthur Greenwood and then Clement Attlee.

Despite the creation of the New Welcome Lodge, there remained an element of hostility to Masonry within the Labour Party. As well as the alleged Tory connections, they accused Freemasonry of having unaccountable influence within the judicial system. This issue was brought to the forefront of English politics in the 1990s when Jack Straw, Home Secretary in the Tony Blair government attempted to force all Freemasons who worked as police officers, judges or magistrates to publicly declare membership in the organisation. In 2009, the ruling that freemasons had to declare if they were judges or magistrates was scrapped by Straw after fears that he would lose a court case at the European Court of Human Rights. Critics regard the group Common Purpose as an attempt to set up a pro-Labour freemasonry equivalent.

=== Conspiracy theories ===
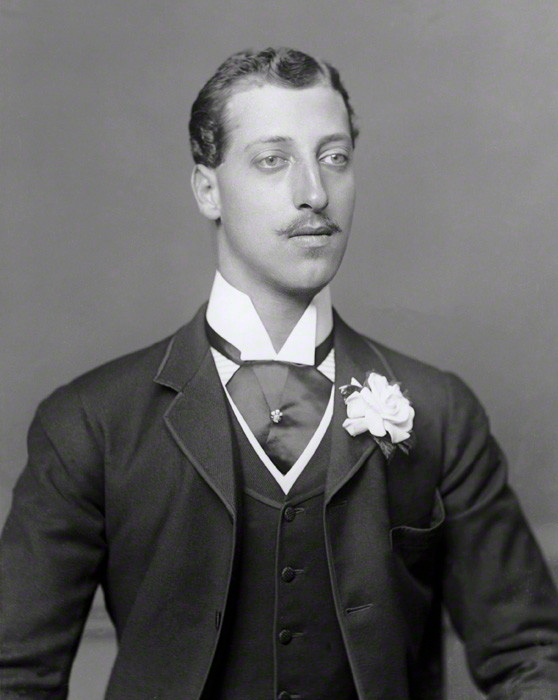
A 1970s theory connected Freemasonry and the Duke of Clarence to Jack the Ripper.

As with freemasonry in other countries, the United Grand Lodge of England has featured as the subject of Masonic conspiracy theories; the most persistent of these attempts to link freemasonry to a "cover-up" or whitewash of the Jack the Ripper case (in some cases, conspiracy theorists have claimed that the killings were masonic ritual murder), the inquiry into the Sinking of the RMS Titanic (though Lord Mersey, Sydney Buxton and Lord Pirrie), and Bloody Sunday (though Lord Widgery).

In the Ripper case, Stephen Knight's Jack the Ripper: The Final Solution (1976) attempted to implicate freemasonry and the British royal family in the murders through the personage of the Duke of Clarence and Avondale. Elements of this theory, through the novel of Alan Moore and Eddie Campbell, even made its way into a major American film, From Hell (2001). The Hughes Brothers who produced the film, even approached the United Grand Lodge of England to get the "masonic bits" right, but, they were rebuffed due to the anti-masonic nature of the storyline. Another thesis, promoted by Bruce Robinson in his They All Love Jack (2015), attempts to link the case to freemasonry through Michael Maybrick.

Some native proponents of more generic anti-masonic conspiracy theories involving the Illuminati (based on John Robison and Augustin Barruel) have typically sought to implicate only Continental Freemasonry as a subversive force, while claiming to not be attacking the United Grand Lodge of England itself or British freemasonry more generally. This is the case with Nesta Helen Webster in her Secret Societies and Subversive Movements (1924). The American-born but English-domiciled Lady Queenborough pulled fewer punches with her Occult Theocrasy (1933), claiming that English freemasonry was founded as a front for the "Manichean" Rosicrucians. Many of these conspiracy theorists also attempted to implicate Jews or Jesuits as working hand in hand with masonry (such as Barry Domvile, coiner of the epithet "Judmas").

== Coat of Arms ==
King George V granted UGLE the following coat of arms through Royal Warrant:

Coat of arms of United Grand Lodge of England
Granted Royal Warrant 19 July 1919; Exemplified 29 July 1919 Crest On a wreath of the colours, A representation of an Ark supported on either side by a cherub proper, with the motto over in Hebrew characters "Holiness to the Lord". Escutcheon Per pale gules and quarterly azure and Or, dexter on a chevron between three castles argent a pair of compasses extended of the third, sinister a cross quarterly of the fourth and vert between in the first quarter a lion rampant of the third, in the second an ox passant sable, in the third a man with hands elevated proper vested of the fifth the robe crimson lined with ermine, and in the fourth an eagle displayed also of the third; the whole within a bordure of the first charged with eight lions passant guardant of the third. Supporters On either side a cherub proper. Motto Audi, vide, tace Symbolism The arms of the Grand Lodge are partially based on the arms granted to the Masons' Company in 1472. The other half of the shield shows the arms of the Atholl Masons. The Atholl Masons were a fraction of Masons, which became part of the Grand Lodge. The Atholl Masons made use of the emblems of the four Evangelists : 1. Mark: a lion - indicative of one who, prior to this contact with Christianity, was weak but later became strong. It symbolically expresses resurrection and courage. 2. Luke : a bull - an animal used for sacrifice - symbolic of sacrifice and renunciation. 3. Matthew : a man - symbolic of incarnation. 4. John : an eagle - the Ascension of Christ - symbolic of immortality. Between the four Evangelists stands the Cross.; The bordure shows the tincture and lions of England. The crest is a combination of the motto of the Atholl masons and an Ark, a reference to the Mosaic antiquity of the Craft. The cherubs face one another (Exodus 25:20) and guarded and denoted Divinity. They were also used in the decoration of King Solomon's Temple.

== See also ==
- Freemasons' Hall, London
- Museum of Freemasonry, London
