= Hiram Abiff =

Fictitious character in Masonic allegory, based on Old Testament character

Hiram Abiff (also Hiram Abif or the Widow's son) is the central character of an allegory presented to all candidates during the third degree in Freemasonry.

Hiram (Phoenician: 𐤇𐤓𐤌 Ḥirōm; Hebrew: חירם Ḥīrām; also called Hirom or Huram) is presented as the chief architect of King Solomon's Temple. He is murdered inside this Temple by three ruffians, after they failed to obtain from him the Master Masons' secrets. The themes of the allegory are the importance of fidelity, and the certainty of death.

== The Masonic legend of Hiram Abiff ==
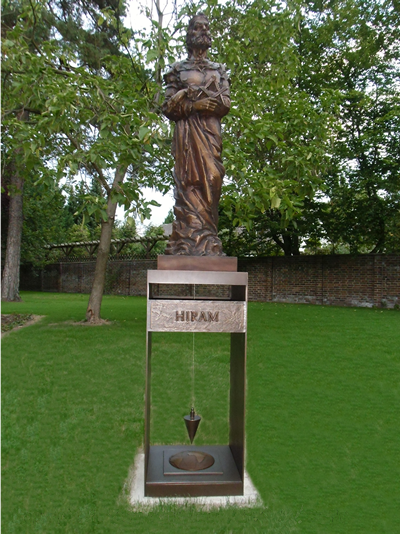
Bronze statue by Nickolaus-Otto Kruch, Berlin, Germany (2013).

The legend of Hiram Abiff as related in Anglo-American Masonic jurisdictions underpins the Third Degree and first appeared in the early 1720s. It generally starts with his arrival in Jerusalem, and his appointment by Solomon as chief architect and master of works at the construction of his temple. As the temple is nearing completion, three fellowcraft masons from the workforce ambush him as he leaves the building, demanding the secrets of a master mason. Hiram is challenged by each in turn and, at each refusal to divulge the information, his assailant strikes him with a mason's tool (differing between jurisdictions). He is injured by the first two assailants, and struck dead by the last.

His murderers hide his body under a pile of rubble, returning at night to move the body outside the city, where they bury it in a shallow grave marked with a sprig of acacia. As the Master is missed the next day, Solomon sends out a group of fellowcraft masons to search for him. The loose acacia is accidentally discovered, and the body exhumed to be given a decent burial. The hiding place of the "three ruffians" is also discovered, and they are brought to justice. Solomon informs his workforce that the secret word of a master mason is now lost. He replaces it with a substitute word which is considered a secret by Masons.

In Continental Freemasonry, the tale is slightly different: a large number of master masons, and not just Hiram, are working on the Temple, and the three ruffians are seeking the passwords and signs that will give them a higher wage. The result is the same, but this time, it is Master Masons who find the body. The secrets are not lost, but Solomon orders them buried under the Temple, inscribed on Hiram's grave, and the same substitution is made as a mark of respect. The secrets "lost" in the other tradition are here given to new Master Masons as part of their ritual. In this version, Hiram is often renamed Adoniram.

=== Historical origin of the legend ===
There have been many proposals for the origin of the Masonic Hiram Abiff story that are dismissed by most historical-critical Masonic scholars.

The leading theory supported by many scholars of historical Freemasonry was advanced by the French masonic historian Paul Naudon who, in 2005, highlighted the similarity between the death of Hiram and the murder of Renaud de Montauban in the late 12th Century chanson de geste, The Four Sons of Aymon. Renaud, like his prototype Saint Reinold, was killed by a hammer-blow to the head while working as a mason at Cologne Cathedral, and his body hidden by his murderers before being miraculously re-discovered.

In 2021, Christopher Powell published a paper in the journal of Quatuor Coronati Lodge, the Ars Quatuor Coronatorum, which argues that John Theophilus Desaguliers likely authored the Hiram Abiff legend in the early 1720s and introduced it into the Master Mason degree. In his research, Powell notes how Desaguliers also introduced the "lost word" aspect of the Royal Arch degree which he likely read in a book he owned titled "The Temple of Solomon, portrayed by Scripture-light." If the word was to be found, it would need to be first lost, hence the Hiram Abiff story. According to Powell, Desaguliers as a Frenchman living in England, would have known the chanson de geste legend, and used it as a base for the legend of Hiram Abiff. However instead of being used as a ritual since the 12th century, Powell argues that Desaguliers used this existing myth to create a central story for the newly created Master Masonic degree, for which there is no evidence before 1720.

== Hirams in the Bible ==
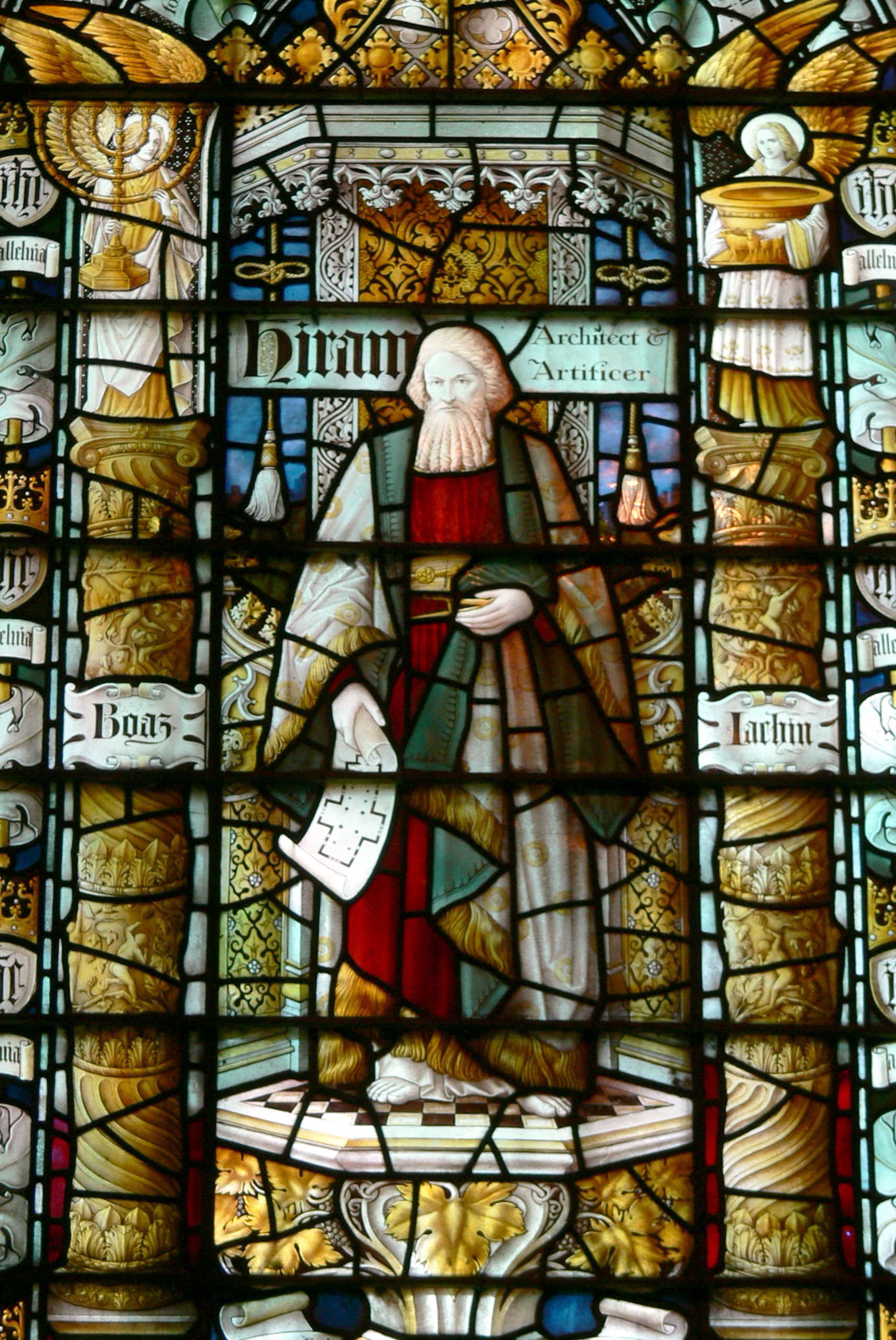
Architect Hiram, St. John's Church, Chester (1900).

In the Hebrew Bible or Old Testament, there are three separate instances of people named Hiram involved in the construction of Solomon's Temple:

- Hiram I, King of Tyre (now in Lebanon), is credited in 2 Samuel 5:11 and 1 Kings 5:1–10 for having sent building materials and men for the original construction of the Temple in Jerusalem. In the Masonic drama, "Hiram, King of Tyre" is clearly distinguished from "Hiram Abiff". The former is clearly a king, and the latter is clearly a master craftsman. They can be confused in other contexts.
- In 1 Kings 7:13–14, Hiram is described as the son of a widow from the tribe of Naphtali who was the son of a Tyrian bronze worker, sent for by Solomon to cast the bronze furnishings and ornate decorations for the new temple. From this reference, Freemasons often refer to Hiram (with the added Abiff) as "the widow's son." Hiram cast these bronzes in clay ground in the plain of the Jordan River between Sukkot and Zaretan (1 Kings 7:46–47).
- 2 Chronicles 2:12–13 relates a formal request from King Solomon of Jerusalem to King Hiram I of Tyre, for workers and for materials to build a new temple.

וְעַתָּ֗ה שָׁלַ֧חְתִּי אִישׁ־חָכָ֛ם יוֹדֵ֥עַ בִּינָ֖ה לְחוּרָ֥ם אָבִֽי׃

Now I am sending you someone skillful and intelligent, my master Huram,

בֶּן־אִשָּׁ֞ה מִן־בְּנ֣וֹת דָּ֗ן וְאָבִ֣יו אִישׁ־צֹרִ֡י יוֹדֵ֡עַ לַעֲשׂ֣וֹת בַּזָּֽהָב־וּ֠בַכֶּ֠סֶף בַּנְּחֹ֨שֶׁת בַּבַּרְזֶ֜ל בָּאֲבָנִ֣ים וּבָעֵצִ֗ים בָּאַרְגָּמָ֤ן בַּתְּכֵ֙לֶת֙ וּבַבּ֣וּץ וּבַכַּרְמִ֔יל וּלְפַתֵּ֙חַ֙ כׇּל־פִּתּ֔וּחַ וְלַחְשֹׁ֖ב כׇּל־מַחֲשָׁ֑בֶת אֲשֶׁ֤ר יִנָּֽתֶן־לוֹ֙ עִם־חֲכָמֶ֔יךָ וְֽחַכְמֵ֔י אֲדֹנִ֖י דָּוִ֥יד אָבִֽיךָ׃

the son of a Danite woman, his father a Tyrian. He is skilled at working in gold, silver, bronze, iron, precious stones, and wood; in purple, blue, and crimson yarn and in fine linen; and at engraving and designing whatever will be required of him, alongside your skilled workers and those of my lord, your father David.

Older translations preferred to translate "'ab-" as father rather than "master". The common translation of the -i suffix is "my", giving the problematic reading that Hiram was sending his own father, also called Hiram. This is found in the Vulgate, the Douay–Rheims Bible, and in Wycliffe's Bible. The other reading is as the old Hebrew genitive, and some variant of "of my father" is found in the Septuagint, the Bishop's Bible and the Geneva Bible. In his 1723 "Constitutions", James Anderson announced that many problems with this text would be solved by reading "'abi" as the second part of a proper name, which he rendered as "Hiram Abif", agreeing with the translations of Martin Luther and Miles Coverdale's reading of 2 Chronicles 4:16.

== Other accounts of a biblical Hiram ==
Josephus, in his Antiquities of the Jews 8:76, refers to Hiram as an artificer or craftsman (Koine Greek: τεχνίτης, romanized: tekhnítēs). "Now Solomon sent for an artificer out of Tyre, whose name was Hiram: he was by birth of the tribe of Naphtali, on his mother's side (for she was of that tribe); but his father was Ur, of the stock of the Israelites."

The Targum Sheni, a Jewish Palestinian Aramaic commentary on the Book of Esther written sometime between the Fall of the Western Roman Empire and the Crusades, credits Hiram with the construction of a miraculous throne for Solomon, which in Esther's time is being used by the descendants of Cyrus the Great.

== Later accounts of Hiram Abiff ==
The most elaborate version of the legend occurs in Gérard de Nerval's 1851 account, Voyage en Orient, where he relates the tale, inserting all the masonic passwords, as part of the story of Balkis, the "Queen of the Morning" and "Soliman", Prince of the Genii. This is an elaboration of the second version above, where the Master Craftsman is named Adoniram. Before his death, he undergoes mystical adventures as his tale is interwoven with that of Solomon and Balkis, the Queen of Sheba. The ruffians who kill him are under the instruction of Solomon himself. De Nerval relates the story as having been told in an Eastern coffee house over a two-week period. A similar account is given in Charles William Heckethorn's The Secret Societies of all Ages and Countries, where Solomon plots to destroy Hiram because of the mutual love between Hiram and the Queen of Sheba. Meanwhile, in 1862, the whole adventure of Adoniram's love for Balkis and his murder by three workmen in the pay of Solomon had been set to music in Charles Gounod's opera, La reine de Saba.

== Other theories ==
=== Seqenenre Tao ===
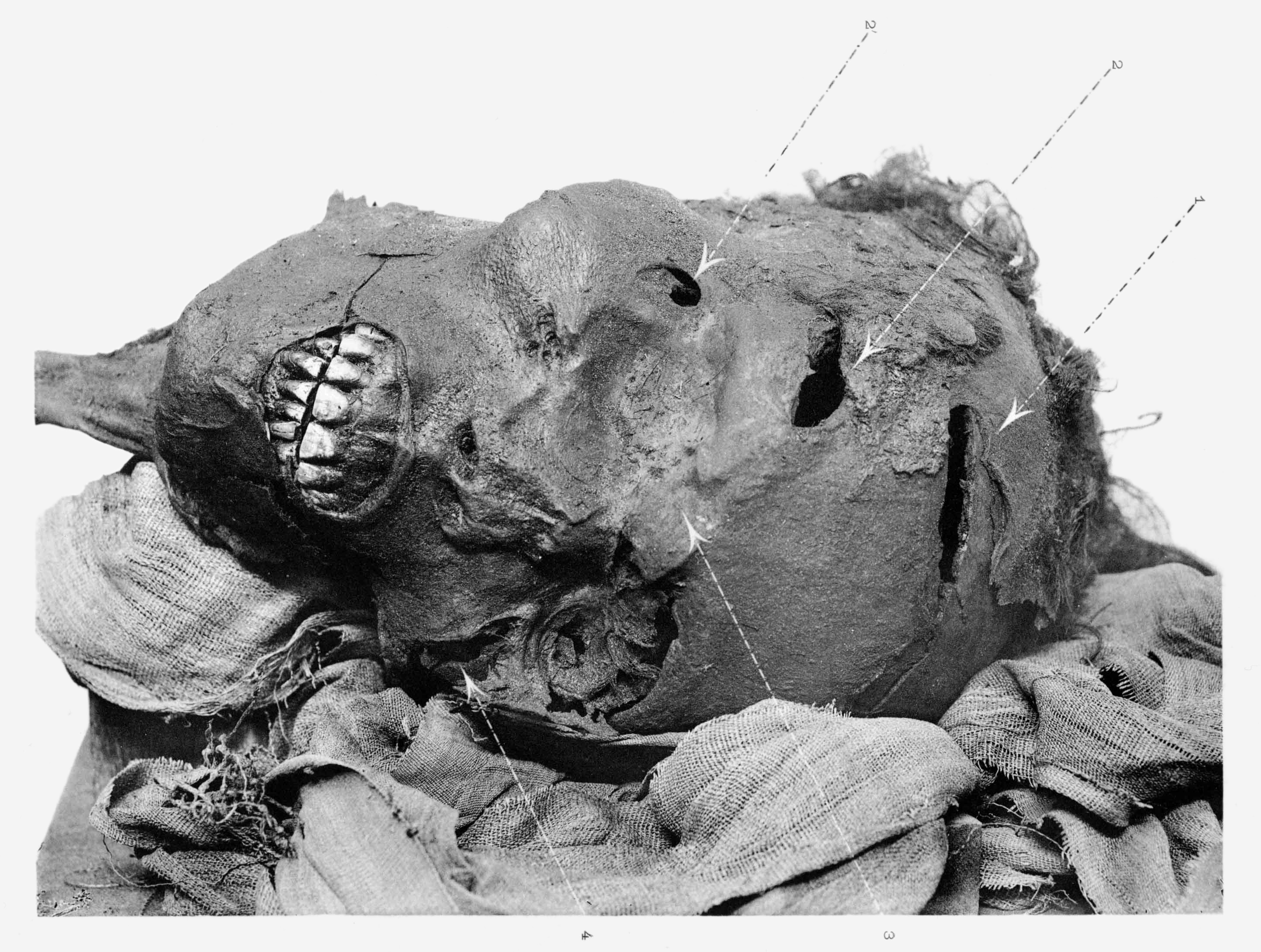
Robert Lomas and Christopher Knight claim the wounds of Seqenenre Tao make him a match for Hiram Abiff

According to Robert Lomas and Christopher Knight, the prototype for Hiram Abiff was the Egyptian king Seqenenre Tao, who they claim died in an almost identical manner. This idea is dismissed by most Masonic scholars, some of whom have described the theory as "highly imaginative" but ultimately one with "no historical validity."

=== Dhul-Nun al-Misri ===
In his book The Sufis, the Afghan scholar Idries Shah suggested that Dhu'l-Nun al-Misri (d. 862) might have been the origin of the character Hiram Abiff in Masonic ritual and symbolism. The link, he believes, was through the Sufi order called al-Banna 'The Builders"', who built the Al-Aqsa Mosque and the Dome of the Rock in Jerusalem. This fraternity could have influenced some early masonic guilds, which borrowed heavily from the Arab architecture in the creation of Gothic architecture.

Others, such as the German Islamic scholar Annemarie Schimmel, are critical of Shah's work. She has claimed that The Sufis, along with his other books, "should be avoided by serious students".
