= Uriel's Machine =

1999 book by Christopher Knight and Robert Lomas

- Pbk. edition
- Authors: Christopher Knight and Robert Lomas
- Language: English
- Subject: Book of Enoch; British megalith architecture
- Publisher: Century
- Publication date: 10 June 1999
- Publication place: United Kingdom
- Media type: Print (Hardcover)
- Pages: xiii, 466 (first edition)
- ISBN: 0-7126-8007-1
- OCLC: 41582120
- Dewey Decimal: 933.61

Uriel's Machine: The Prehistoric Technology That Survived the Flood is a non-fiction book by Christopher Knight and Robert Lomas that explores an alternate interpretation of the Book of Enoch. According to Knight and Lomas, Uriel warned Enoch about the impending flood, giving Enoch instructions to build a solar observatory, or machine, for the purpose of preserving advanced knowledge.

== Summary ==
In Masonic mythology there are many references to seven, which the authors speculate could refer to seven cometary fragments. These seven cometary fragments are described in the book as hitting the Earth in prehistory causing tsunamis. The authors link this speculation to the work of geologists Edith and Alexander Tollmann. Their work proposes a series of meteors hitting the earth over the last 10,000 years, especially circa 7640 BC. Their evidence and counter-evidence is discussed in the article Tollmann's hypothetical bolide.

The book proposes that what the authors believe to have been stellar observatories (such as the first wooden Stonehenge) in Britain, and structures in the Boyne Valley in Ireland, show sufficient knowledge to be able to predict prescribed solar, lunar and venusian events and cycles, such as solstices and equinoxes. If rituals at Stonehenge involved stargazing, there is then the opportunity for an anomalous object to be spotted far more quickly if the cycles of observed celestial objects are known.

The authors quote textual evidence from the book of Enoch, noting other coincidences made between Enoch and astronomy; for example, it is said he lived 365 years, which could be a reference to a year (365.25 days).

The authors suggest that chambers (souterrains) found in Britain might have been attempts to build shelters to be sealed against tsunamis that would have been caused by a cometary impact in the sea. However, the souterrains have been dated to the late Iron Age, thousands of years after the supposed impact event.

Archaeologists and astronomers have been extremely sceptical about this idea. Prof Archie Roy (an astronomer and psychic researcher) and Robert Lomas gave a joint talk about technological possibilities in Megalithic society at the 2000 Orkney International Science.

== Critical response ==
Tim Schadla-Hall, archaeologist and editor of the journal Public Archaeology, has cited the book as an example of pseudoscience, in which the authors "quote established academics in such a way as to make it seem as though they support their arguments". The geology in the book is based on Tollmann's hypothetical bolide which has been rejected by specialists in meteorite and comet impacts.

Stephen Tonkin, author and astronomer, said: "I believe that the astronomical basis of this book is sufficiently flawed as to render any conclusions that the authors draw from it to be highly suspect."

Mike Pitts, archaeologist and journalist, says that the book contains "what we might politely call a radically alternative approach to Grooved Ware pottery" and notes that the book's bibliography contains "such items as Myths and Legends of Australia, Robert the Bruce and The Pleistocene Elephants of Siberia, but not a single primary archaeological source for England (where, it has to be said, a great deal of Grooved Ware has been found)."

== See also ==
- Pseudoarchaeology
- Archaeoastronomy
