= The Hiram Key =

1996 book by Christopher Knight and Robert Lomas

- Author: Christopher Knight Robert Lomas
- Publication date: 1998
- ISBN: 978-0552980593

The Hiram Key: Pharaohs, Freemasonry, and the Discovery of the Secret Scrolls of Jesus, is a 1996 book by Christopher Knight and Robert Lomas. The authors, both Freemasons, present a theory of the origins of Freemasonry as part of their "true story" of the historical Jesus and the original Jerusalem Church.

== Key points in theory ==
The authors claim that their work proves the following:

- Freemasonry can trace its roots to the death of the Egyptian king Sequenenre in 1570 B.C. at the hands of the Hyksos.
- Moses merged this event with Sumerian and Egyptian mythology, symbols and philosophy, to create a putative 'royal line'.
- Solomon incorporated these symbols into his temple
- Jesus and the Qumran community used a ritual based on this story
- The early Roman Church effectively suppressed the original beliefs of this Jerusalem Church.
- The Knights Templar, discovering the Qumran communities' records in the vaults under the Temple in Jerusalem, transported them to Rosslyn Chapel in Scotland.
- When Scotland became unsafe for the Templars, they incorporated their beliefs and history into the rituals of Freemasonry as it is known today.
- America named after the Nasoraean Mandaean morning star 'Merica'

== Synopsis ==
Knight and Lomas begin by quoting Henry Ford, who was a Freemason, as saying "all history is bunk". They express the belief that, though Ford's statement may be abrupt, it is accurate, as history is often not a completely accurate and comprehensive account of facts, but only what the dominant or orthodox view of the time has recorded for posterity.

The authors make their case through the use of dialectics. The technique requires the reader to accept a basic premise, and then proceeds in a logical order; requiring the reader to weigh the merit of each step on the way to a conclusion. If the initial premise, and each of the steps in logic towards the conclusion have merit, the conclusion can represent a legitimate, possible explanation.

The authors of The Hiram Key propose a possible sequence of events that led to modern Freemasonry, although much of their narrative has been debated by historians and other researchers. A criticism of their approach by those unfamiliar with the science of "dialectical progression" is that the authors have gathered irrelevant and often unevidenced 'facts' to arrive at an equally unproven theory. Even those familiar with the application of dialectics may concede that the conclusion of such logic is only as good as its weakest link. All Historical study is based on dialectical appraisal of evidence, and all sources of information subject to interpretation as the "weakest link."

Knight and Lomas are not professional historians nor have they any qualifications in history or research, and their case is open to the criticism that they accept references that fit their theory and reject those that conflict with it.

Nonetheless they argue in the book that the foundations of the Christian religion are a distortion by the early Roman Catholic Church of the teachings of the real Jesus and his followers. They claim to have found in Freemasonry a new 'key' to unlock the secrets of civilization. This key is also the key to the origins of Christianity and, they assert, proves that many of the beliefs of modern religion may well have come to be, at least partly, through imprecise historical interpretation.

Knight and Lomas state that one of the main motivations in writing the book stemmed from a desire to ascertain the origins of Freemasonry, following their own experiences of being initiated into it. Did it arrive, fully formed at the foundation of the Premier Grand Lodge of England on 24 June 1717, or was that the first public acknowledgement of something much older?

One widely held theory is that Freemasonry evolved out of guilds of stonemasons. Traditional Masonic ritual claims that one of the first Freemasons was Hiram Abiff, a widow's son from the tribe of Naphtali, who was the Architect of King Solomon's Temple. His name has never been recorded as such historically, although there is a similar character in the Old Testament of the Bible, who is not named, but is described as a widow's son, in the First Book of Kings.

Although not apparently named in some translations of the bible, others, such as the Coverdale translation and the original Martin Luther translation do indeed refer to him as "Hiram Abiff" or as "Huram Abi". The word "abi" is translated as "father" or "my father" in other translations whilst the Luther and Coverdale translations treated it as a personal name. The Jewish Study Bible suggests that the word "father" is an honorific title applied to a skilled craftsman. The use of "abu" meaning "father" as an honorific is still used in the Middle East today, hence "Abukir" named after "Father" or Saint Cyril.

The book's authors claim that the stonemason-origin theory could be discounted because it had so many apparent fallacies. Why would powerful and rich people have been attracted to join a fraternity that came from poor and uneducated stonemasons' guilds? The theory of Freemasonry originating in London in 1717 is also regarded as unlikely, because there are earlier mentions of Freemasonry in other locations. The authors concluded that Freemasonry was actually as old as it claimed in its traditional ritual, dating back to the building of King Solomon's Temple in Jerusalem.

Knight and Lomax claim to have analysed their sources rigorously, including the Old Testament and New Testament of the Bible, ancient Jewish texts, the Dead Sea Scrolls, the Gnostic Gospels, and Masonic rituals to support their conclusions. They note the global significance of religion and that any major refutation of commonly held beliefs would meet resistance from the established and orthodox authorities in any particular religion. In support of that point Knight and Lomax cite the treatment of the Dead Sea Scrolls. They note that, 40 years after their discovery, only about half of the available material had ever been published or made available for independent review. It was not until 1991 that public access restrictions were lifted. The scrolls contained various versions of Biblical texts, all of which were more than 1000 years older than the oldest surviving Hebrew texts that were produced by Aaron ben Moses ben Asher in AD 1008. The texts of these scrolls are believed by the authors to have been written by ancestors of the same Qumran community of the Judaean hills that found them. The authors also believe that the Qumran Community were Essenes, and that they and the Nasoreans and the original Jerusalem Church were all one and the same. That is, the ancient Qumranians were the first Christians.

They decided that the story of Hiram Abiff was actually based on the initiation ceremonies of the ancient kings of Egypt. They also came to the conclusion, after analysis of the New Testament, the Gnostic Gospels, and Masonic ritual, that Jesus and the original Christians were thoroughly different from what the Roman Catholic Church and orthodox Christianity has taught they were.

The authors believe that Jesus did not claim to be divine, but was instead a messiah in the Jewish sense of the term, a good man and a freedom fighter, trying to liberate the Jews from Roman occupation.

The authors do not claim that the Christianity is incompatible with the ideals and goals of Freemasonry. Neither do they claim that the Jewish Faith or the Muslim faith or Buddhist faith are incompatible with the tenets of Freemasonry. Although The Hiram Key highlights some inconsistent historical references within various dogmas, they do not claim dogma to be devoid of value to humanity. The book is more an examination of historical references rather than an examination of religion.

Jesus did not claim to work miracles, according to the authors. When Jesus claimed to have raised Lazarus from the dead, it was intended as an allegorical reference; followers were referred to as the "living" and others were referred to as the "dead" in certain Jewish esotericism of the time. Similarly, Jesus' turning water into wine merely meant elevating people to a higher status within the framework of the sect.

The authors believe that Jesus' sect, the Jerusalem Church, operated some kind of "quasi-Masonic" initiation ceremonies and develop that line of thought to claim that Jesus was thus, in a sense, a Freemason.

In Chapter 5 of the Hiram Key, Jesus Christ: Man, God, Myth, or Freemason?, the authors state: "We realise that this is a statement that will offend many Christians, and particularly many Roman Catholics," but the conclusion they came to, based upon historical context derived outside the accepted religious context, was that Jesus was a Freemason.

== Controversy ==
The book contains a radical hypothesis about the origins of Freemasonry, seeking to demonstrate a heritage back through the Knights Templar to the Jerusalem Church and Pharaoic Egypt, claiming to draw on a wide range of material to support this hypothesis.

The work has been subject to criticism from within the established body of masonic-research, based on:

- Creeping assertion - caveats on statements are reduced as the statements are used as foundation for further development.
- Lack of critical assessment of sources.
- Use of symbolic ritual as a statement of historic fact.

Quatuor Coronati Lodge No 2067 the principal Lodge of Masonic research under the United Grand Lodge of England, has criticised the book as Pseudohistory, and some Masonic libraries categorise the volume as fiction.

Reviews of the work are commonly critical; publishers of this criticism include:

- Grand Lodge of British Columbia and Yukon
- Masonic Info
- Quatuor Coronati Lodge No 2067, on the register of the United Grand Lodge of England
- Masonic Quarterly, an official publication of the United Grand Lodge of England
- Freemasonry Today, an official publication of the United Grand Lodge of England

== Publication ==
- Published in the United Kingdom by Century Books in 1996.
- Published in the United States as a 384-page hardcover by Element Books in 1997 (ISBN 1-86204-004-4)
- Published in the United States as a paperback in 1998 (ISBN 1-86204-221-7)
- Re-published in 2001 (paperback, ISBN 1-931412-75-8; hardcover ISBN 1-59233-159-9), Fair Winds Press
