= Oldest profession =

Phrase commonly referring to prostitution

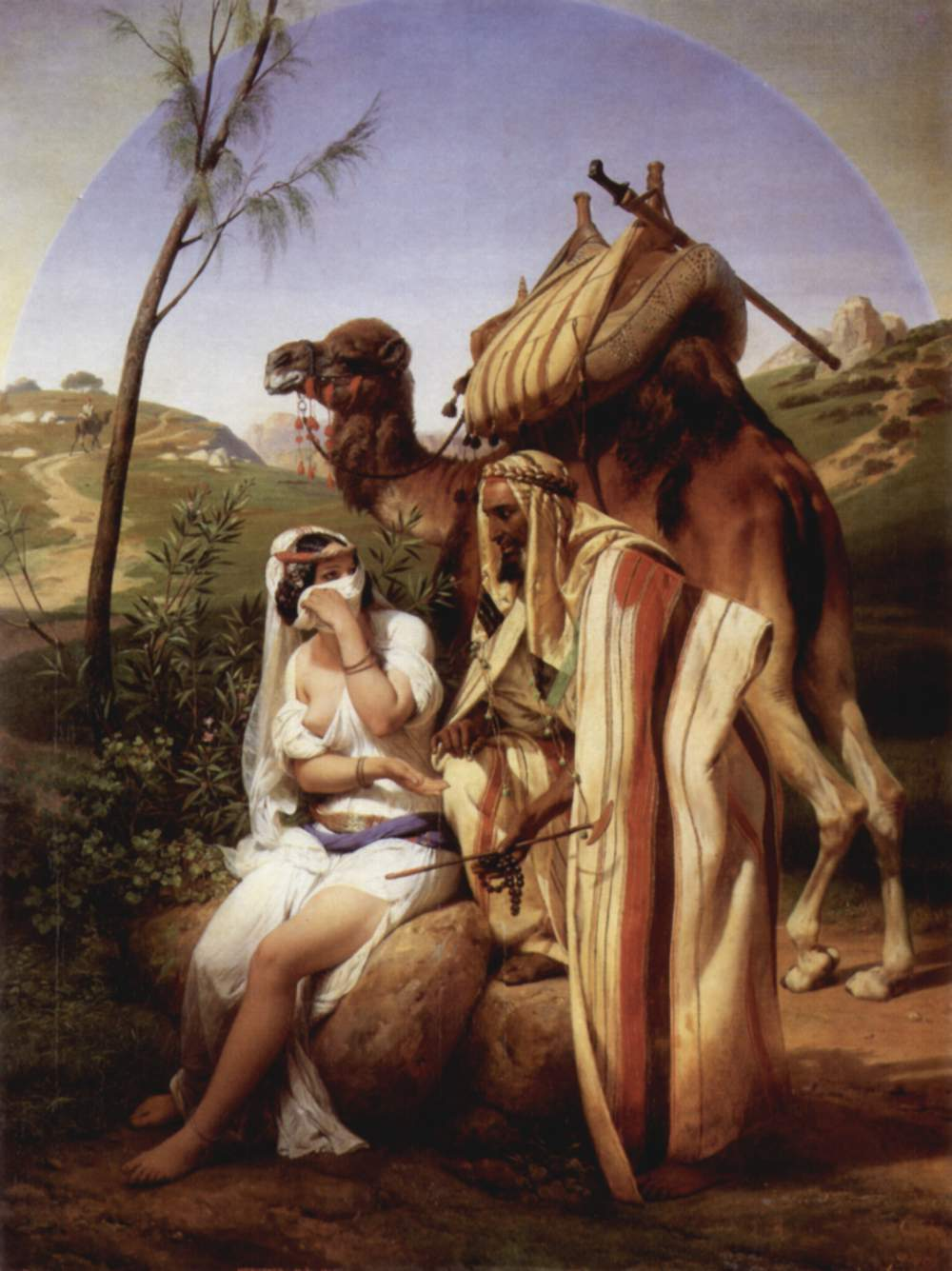
The biblical Tamar poses as a harlot to seduce Judah (Horace Vernet, Judah and Tamar, oil on canvas, 1840).

The oldest profession in the world (or the world's oldest profession) is a phrase that, unless another meaning is specified, refers to prostitution. However, it did not start to acquire that meaning until 1889, after a Rudyard Kipling story, and it did not do so universally until after World War I. Formerly, various professions vied for the reputation of being the oldest.

== Earlier senses ==
The claim to be the oldest profession was made on behalf of farmers, cattle drovers, horticulturalists, barbers, engineers, landscape gardeners, the military, doctors, nurses, teachers, priests, lay preachers, architects, housewives, husband-hunters, and even lawyers.

Perhaps the earliest recorded claim to be the world's oldest profession was made on behalf of tailors. The Song in Praise of the Merchant-Taylors, attested from 1680, which was routinely performed at pageants at the Lord Mayor's Show, London, if the current mayor happened to belong to the tailors' guild, began:

Of all the professions that ever were nam'd,
The taylor's, though slighted, is much to be fam'd':
For various invention, and antiquity,
No trade with the tayler's comparèd may be:

After pointing out that Adam and Eve made garments for themselves, and were therefore tailors, it continued:

Then judge if a tayler was not the first trade.
The oldest profession, and they are but raylers,
Who scoff and deride men that be merchant-taylers.

In Margaret Cavendish's play The Sociable Companions (1668) soldiers claim "our profession, which is to rob, fight and kill, is the most ancient profession that is".

The Irish poet Henry Brooke (1701–1783) declared that humbugging (i.e. scamming) was the oldest profession:

Of all trades and arts in repute or possession,
Humbugging is held the most ancient profession.

The phrase had also been applied to murderers. In The Secret Societies of All Ages and Countries (1875), Charles William Heckethorn, describing the Thugs of India, said:

The hierophant, on initiating the candidate, says to him: "Thou hast chosen, my son, the most ancient profession, the most acceptable to the deity. Thou hast sworn to put to death every human being fate throws into thy hand..."

== Association with prostitution ==
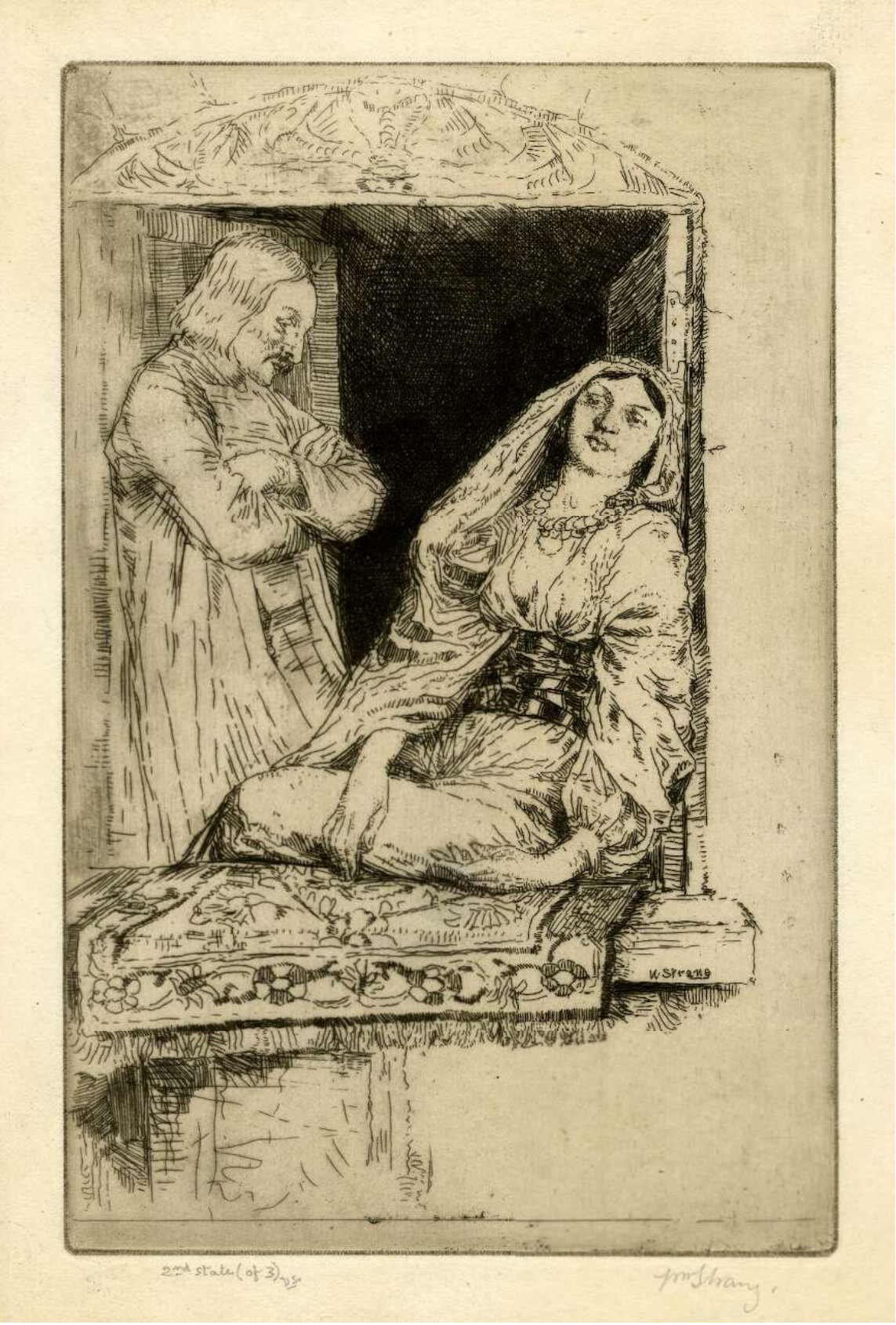
Lalun (William Strang, etching on paper, 1900-1901)

The phrase began to be associated with prostitution in the last decade of the nineteenth century following Rudyard Kipling's short story about an Indian prostitute, On the City Wall (January 1889). Kipling, after citing a biblical reference, began:

Lalun is a member of the most ancient profession in the world. Lilith was her very-great-grandmamma, and that was before the days of Eve as every one knows. In the West, people say rude things about Lalun's profession, and write lectures about it, and distribute the lectures to young persons in order that Morality may be preserved. In the East where the profession is hereditary, descending from mother to daughter, nobody writes lectures or takes any notice; and that is a distinct proof of the inability of the East to manage its own affairs.

In a scathing article on the morals of the aristocracy in the mass circulation Reynold's Newspaper, 22 July 1894, the reference was repeated:

In ancient Rome, under the empire, ladies used to go to baths to meet a certain class of men, while men resorted thither to meet a certain class of ladies. The ladies belonged to what has been called “the oldest profession in the world", a profession which is carried on in Piccadilly, Regent street, and other parts of London with great energy every night …

In the same year the Pall Mall Gazette reported a speech in which "Mrs. Ormiston Chant … implored us to stand shoulder to shoulder and destroy what Kipling has called 'the oldest profession in the world'".

The phrase was frequently used as a euphemism when delicacy forbade direct reference to prostitution.

In John Galsworthy's play Escape (1926) a prostitute says

I belong to the oldest profession in the world! That isn't true, either—there's an older ... The cop's. Mine wouldn't ever have been a profession but for them.

== Residual usage of the phrase in other senses ==
There is some evidence that older generations of speakers or audiences in rural areas were not at first aware of the phrase's newly acquired meaning. Thus, for some time the following could be said in English newspaper reports without apparent embarrassment: "A certain proportion of the cadets were now leaving to enter the oldest profession in the world" (1895). "This gentleman's name often figures high in local prize lists, and he is considered an enthusiast in 'the oldest profession in the world'" (1902). "Mr Petrie heard the voice of God and observed the working of His hand in ways that are denied to most of us. His speech, and especially his prayers, exhibited a rare consciousness of the beauty of holiness, and were fragrant with phrases of singular charm. As you all know, Mr Petrie followed the oldest profession in the world" (1915). "In conclusion, he [Lord Eustace Percy] reminded the teachers that they were the most ancient profession in the world, having descended from the Academy of Plato, and they must always remember that fact (1924)."

However, those "innocent" uses of the phrase tended to die out as awareness of the newly acquired meaning increased, as did the appreciation that antiquity, of itself, did not make a profession respectable. One sociologist has argued that the phrase did not invariably refer to prostitution until the 1970s.

== Second-oldest profession ==
The phrase "world's second-oldest profession" may refer to any number of trades and professions, playing on perceived similarities to prostitution. One frequent use of the phrase is to refer to spies and spying. An explanation of the phrase's association with espionage is that both spies and prostitutes are mentioned in the same passage in the Book of Joshua.

"Joshua son of Nun sent two spies out from Shittim secretly with orders to reconnoitre the country. The two men came to Jericho and went to the house of a prostitute named Rahab..."

Ronald Reagan referred to politics as the second-oldest profession with the alleged quip, "Someone once said that politics is the second-oldest profession. I'm beginning to think it bears resemblance to the first."

According to the World Almanac website, nominations for the second-oldest profession include: actors, casino gambling, con men, gangsters, counterfeiters, gigolos, glassmakers, interpreters, journalists, moving companies, pharmacists, pickpockets, pimps, pirates, press agents, spies, and quacks.

Many other professions have been called the second-oldest in the media, including tip sheet-sale, litigation, environmental engineering, professional consultancy, pawnbrokering, hotel-management, tomb-raiding, and surveying.
