= Alexander Tollmann =

Austrian geologist and politician (1928–2007)

- Born: 27 June 1928; Vienna, Austria
- Died: 8 August 2007 (aged 79); Vienna, Austria
- Education: University of Vienna
- Known for: Geology of the Eastern Alps; environmental activism; Tollmann's bolide hypothesis
- Scientific career
- Fields: Geology, Tectonics
- Workplaces: University of Vienna

Alexander Tollmann (27 June 1928 – 8 August 2007) was an Austrian geologist and politician associated with the United Greens of Austria (Vereinte Grüne Österreichs, VGÖ). He specialized in the geology and tectonics of the Eastern Alps and was a prominent critic of nuclear energy.

== Early life and education ==
Tollmann completed his Matura in 1946 despite the war years. He studied teaching in natural history and geography, graduating in 1951, followed by a doctorate in geology and paleontology. His 1955 dissertation, Das Neogen am Südwestrand des Leithagebirges zwischen Eisenstadt und Hornstein, was completed sub auspiciis praesidentis at the University of Vienna. He then worked as an assistant there.

== Academic career ==
In the mid-1950s, Tollmann mapped the Radstädter Tauern, clarifying their complex thrust structure in continuation of his teacher Eberhard Clar's work. He habilitated in 1962. From 1969, he was extraordinary professor at the University of Vienna, becoming full professor in 1972 (succeeding Clar) and head of the Institute of Geology until 1984. He retired in 1996 and was a corresponding member of the Bavarian Academy of Sciences (from 1987) and the Austrian Academy of Sciences (from 1992).

His main research focused on the geology of Austria, publishing the multi-volume Geologie von Österreich (1977–1986). His 1963 book Ostalpensynthese sparked controversy amid debates between neo-autochthonist and nappist geological schools. He also authored three major monographs on the Northern Calcareous Alps.

== Political and environmental activism ==
Tollmann advocated for environmental protection, particularly against the controversial Zwentendorf nuclear power plant, which was never commissioned. He chaired the VGÖ from 1982 to 1983; the party, running as the "Tollmann List," received 1.93% in the 1983 elections, missing parliament entry.

In 1990, he and his wife acquired Albrechtsberg Castle in Lower Austria, living there until his death.

== Later controversial hypotheses ==
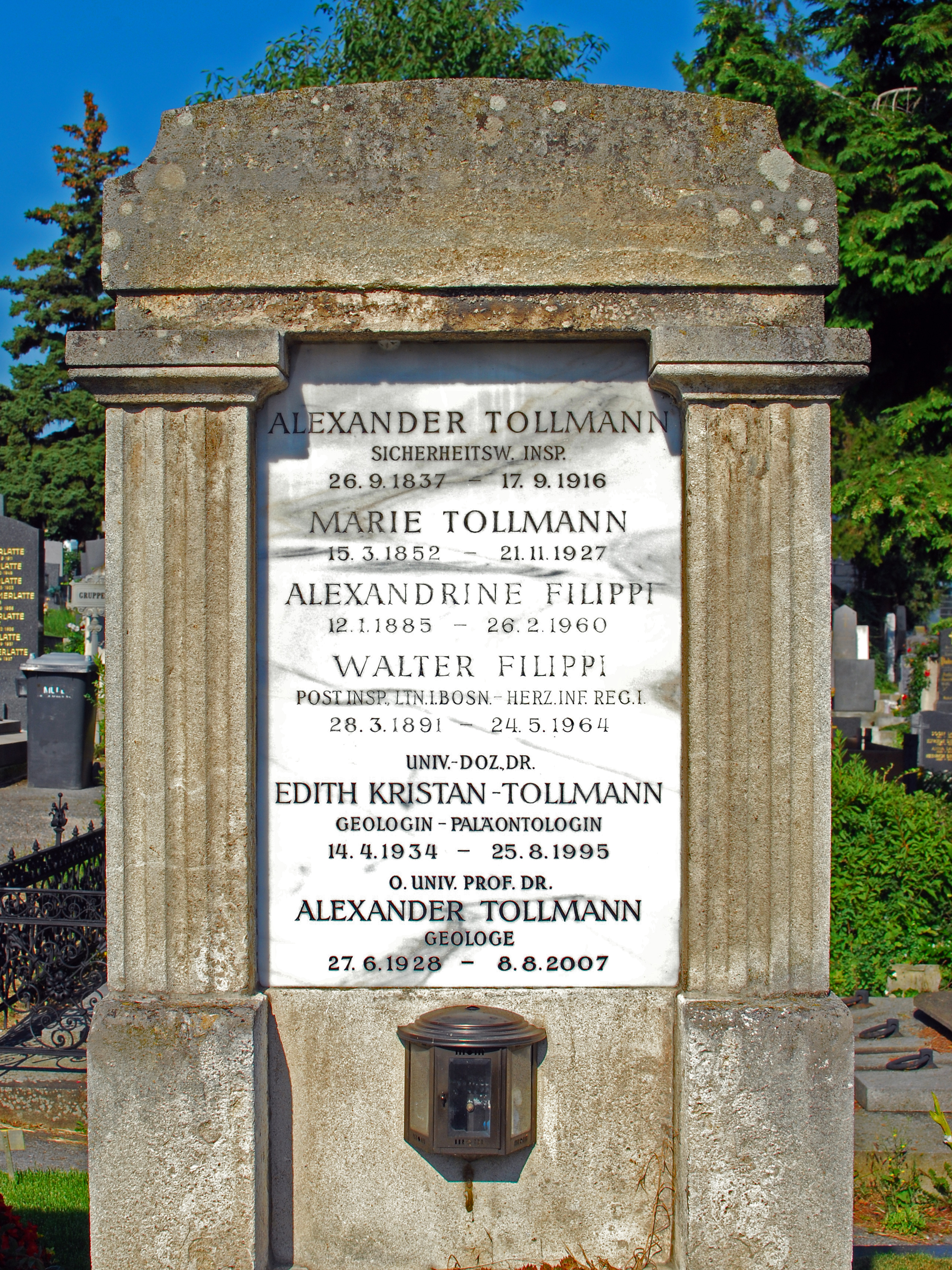
Tollmann's gravestone, Gersthofer Friedhof, Vienna.

With his wife, paleontologist Edith Kristan-Tollmann (married 1959; died 1995), Tollmann proposed in their 1993 book Und die Sintflut gab es doch that Noah's flood and the Book of Revelation described a comet impact 10,000 years ago (see Tollmann's bolide hypothesis), destroying a hypothetical Atlantis civilization. They linked it to structures like the Great Pyramid of Giza.

Later, he embraced esoteric topics, predicting a global catastrophe in August 1999 based on Nostradamus prophecies and the 1999 solar eclipse, awaiting it in a bunker. Their 1998 book Das Weltenjahr geht zur Neige was an Austrian bestseller but drew sharp scientific criticism.

He died on 8 August 2007 in Vienna; his funeral was on 24 August at Gersthofer Friedhof.

== Awards and legacy ==
Honorary member of the Austrian Geological Society; received the Eduard-Sueß Memorial Medal in 1989. Editor (with his wife) of the society's communications (1978–1991).

== Selected works ==
- Ostalpensynthese (1963)
- Geologie von Österreich (3 vols., 1977–1986)
- Und die Sintflut gab es doch (with Edith Tollmann, 1993)
- Das Weltenjahr geht zur Neige (with Edith Tollmann, 1998)
