= Edith Kristan-Tollmann =

Austrian geologist and paleontologist

Edith Kristan-Tollmann, nee Edith Kristan (14 April 1934 in Vienna – 25 August 1995) was an Austrian geologist and paleontologist. A prolific scientist with an interest in micropalaeontology and especially the foraminifera of the Triassic (in the then Tethys Ocean) and the Jurassic eras, Kristan-Tollmann published widely in her field. She is also known for originating with her husband Alexander Tollmann a thoroughly documented theory of the evolution of human legend and social structures as a result of a massive impact event which struck multiple points on earth. The latter has become known as Tollmann's hypothetical bolide.

== Life ==
The daughter of an elementary school director, Kristan-Tollmann initially wanted to become a teacher herself. She received her secondary school diploma from a teacher-training school. However, she shifted her focus to study geology, paleontology and petrography in Vienna under the tutelage of Othmar Kühn, Felix Machachki, Hans Wieseneder and Leopold Kober. She received her doctorate in geology and paleontology in 1959 in the region of Hohe Wand. In the same year she completed her education, she married her classmate Alexander Tollmann, with whom she had a son Raoul in 1967. During her studies she also worked as a religion teacher in Vienna.

Kristan-Tollmann specialized in micropalaeontology and especially the foraminifera of the Triassic (in the then Tethys Ocean) and the Jurassic periods. She described numerous new taxa. In addition to foraminifera, she later treated ostracods and other microfossils and invertebrate macro-fossils such as crinoids (which were a particular favorite of hers), corals, mollusks, brachiopods, and sea cucumbers. After initially working as a freelancer for the Geological Survey of Austria, from 1961 to 1968 she was a micropaleontologist adviser to the OMV. She was a visiting scholar at the Swedish Geological State Institute in Stockholm in 1966 and a Humboldt Fellow at the Naturmuseum Senckenberg and the University of Frankfurt in 1971/72, and then at the University of Tübingen in 1972/73. From 1976 to 1978 she conducted research at the Natural History Museum Vienna.

In 1982 she received a post-doctoral degree in micropaleontology in Vienna and gave courses at the universities in Graz and Innsbruck.

She died in 1995 of cancer.

== Career ==
Kristan-Tollmann collected samples almost all over the Alps and expanded her sampling in the 1970s worldwide (Turkey, Iran, China, Timor, New Guinea, Australia, Japan, Central and North America as the Sonoran Desert in Mexico), on some quite dangerous trips to remote areas. For example, in 1975 she narrowly escaped the East Timor genocide. She often traveled alone, but prepared for her trips quite thoroughly. A major focus of her worldwide work was the global remote correlation of paleontological data in the Triassic Tethys and early Jurassic, the Black Jurassic. She discovered a surprising similarity in the fauna and the sequences, which also led to revisions of descriptions of taxa. Through her work, many of the early macro-fossils from this period which were first described in Austria in the classical period of paleontology and had been described differently in other parts of the world were reassigned. It also led to revisions in the theory of ocean currents in the Tethys Ocean, as larvae were posited to have traveled great distances as part of plankton in that body of water. For one example, she explained the correspondence of observably similar rock bodies in Alpine regions and Chine in the Triassic period as a function of global fluctuations in sea level. She explored the division between the Tethys Ocean and Panthalassa in New Caldonia.

Kristan-Tollmann was a founding member of the Shallow Tethys and was involved in the organization of their meetings, for example, at the 4th Congress in 1994 at the Castle Albrechtsberg the Tollmanns. In 1991 she also organized the 3rd meeting of German-speaking ostracod researchers in Albrechtsberg.

She authored around 120 scientific publications and was the first to describe around 500 new taxa. Her publication areas included foraminifera, ostracods, echinoderms, and calcareous nannofossils.

The collection primarily reflects Edith Kristan-Tollmann's work on Foraminifera from the Triassic and Lower Jurassic and also contains a small amount of material published by her husband Alexander on the Neogene of Austria (full publication list for AT in Lein, 2007). Edith Kristan-Tollmann published extensively not only on Foraminifera but also on ostracods, echinoderms (holothurians, micro-crinoids) and calcareous nannofossils (full publication list in Lobitzer, 1996). Published foraminifera include the genera Variostoma, Diplotremina, Plagiostomella, Duostomina, Asymmetrina from the Triassic (1960) and Scyphodon, Callonina and Nephrosphaera from the Silurian of Austria (1971) and numerous new species. Although early work focused on the Alps and Austria, later published material embraced the Triassic of Iran, India, China, Japan, Indonesia, Papua-New Guinea, Australia and New Zealand, with discussions of taxonomy and distribution patterns throughout Tethys. A number of publications cite material as deposited in 'Sammlung Kristan-Tollmann, Geologisches Institut der Universität Wien' but this is not correct and the specimens were, in fact, retained as a private collection. The Kristan-Tollmann Collection is currently being accessed into the Senckenberg Foraminifera Collections.

From 1978 to 1992, she published along with her husband, Tollmann, the communications of the Austrian Geological Society. From 1975 to 1977 and again from 1990 to 1992, she was on the Advisory Board of the Paleontological Society.

== Catastrophic theories ==
Kristan-Tollmann had been interested in the history of the priesthood and in theology and archaeology since her youth. In 1992, she co-published with her husband Alexander Tollmann an article that posited that around 7,500 BCE a Mesolithic disaster occurred when a comet struck the earth. According to the couple, the comet divided into seven fragments that struck the earth in seven places, documented in the myths and religious tracts of multiple cultures. The pair followed up this publication with a book on the same subject in 1993, Und die Sintflut gab es doch: vom Mythos zur historischen Wahrheit (And The Flood Did Exist: From the Myth to the Historical Truth), which became a bestseller in Austria and Germany. The book attributes to this disaster, with has become known as Tollmann's hypothetical bolide, the origin of priesthood (as a person who facilitates sacrifices to the gods), world religions, the Christian Genesis flood narrative, the myth of Atlantis and many other things. The authors credited the meteorite impact theory of Luis Walter Alvarez as influencing their own theories of a geological catastrophe that so influenced human history. They also postulated that such impact events were recurrent on about a 10,000 year cycle, citing dust bands in the Antarctic ice core around 17,000 to 18,000 years old as an indication that a previous impact had contributed to warming at the end of the last ice age. The theories reported in both the article and the book were the subject of fierce criticism. Other scientists tended to the theory that the Tollmanns had pushed their interpretation of the data too far, although the evidence of a comet impact at the time they posit has not been thoroughly discredited.

Kristan-Tollmann also contributed to a follow-up book with Alexander Tollmann which was not published until after her death, Das Weltenjahr geht zu Ende, in which they predicted that, based on the prophecies of Nostradamus, the world would end at the turn of the millennium.

== Political activism ==
Kristan-Tollmann was active in the anti-nuclear movement and on behalf of environmental protection. Her husband played a significant role in Green politics in Austria. In Und die Sintflut gab es doch, they also warn against exposure to the numerous nuclear power plants around the world, especially with regard to geological (earthquake) and impact risks.

== Select writings ==
- "Rotaliidea (Foraminifera) aus der Trias der Ostalpen", in: Beiträge zur Mikropaläontologie der alpinen Trias, Jahrbuch Geologische Bundesanstalt, Sb. 5, Wien 1960, S. 47–78
- Entwicklungsreihen der Triasforaminiferen. Paläont. Z., 37, 1963, 147–154,
- Zur Charakteristik triadischer Mikrofaunen. Paläont. Z., 38, 1964, 66–73,
- Die Foraminiferen aus den rhätischen Zlambachmergeln der Fischerwiese bei Aussee im Salzkammergut, 1964
- "Die Entwicklung der Tethystrias und Herkunft ihrer Fauna," in: Geologische Rundschau 71(3) · October 1982

=== With Alexander Tollmann ===
- Die Stellung der Tethys in der Trias und die Herkunft ihrer Fauna. Mitt. österr. geol. Ges., 74–75 (1981/82), 129–135,
- Paleogeography of the European Tethys from Paleozoic to Mesozoic and the Triassic Relations of the Eastern Part of Tethys and Panthalassa. In: K. Nakazawa, J. M. Dickins (Herausgeber), The Tethys - Her Paleogeography and Paleobiogeography from Paleozoic to Mesozoic, 3–22, 1985, Tokio (Tokai Univ. Press).
- "How did they manage to travel the World 230 million years ago?" Austria Today, Heft 4, 1985, 33–40,
- Und die Sintflut gab es doch. Vom Mythos zur historischen Wahrheit, Droemer-Knaur 1993 (also translated into Dutch)
- "The youngest big impact on Earth deduced from geological and historical evidence." Terra Nova, March 1994
