= Pseudoscientific metrology =

Highly speculative approaches in historic metrology

Some approaches in the branch of historic metrology are highly speculative and can be qualified as pseudoscience.

== Origins ==
In 1637, John Greaves, professor of geometry at Gresham College, made his first of several studies in Egypt and Italy, making numerous measurements of buildings and monuments, including the Great Pyramid. These activities fuelled many centuries of interest in metrology of the ancient cultures by the likes of Isaac Newton and the French Academy.

== Charles Piazzi Smyth ==
John Taylor, in his 1859 book The Great Pyramid: Why Was It Built? & Who Built It?, claimed that the Great Pyramid of Giza was planned and the building supervised by the biblical Noah, and that it was "built to make a record of the measure of the Earth". A paper presented to the Royal Academy on the topic was rejected.

Taylor's theories were, however, the inspiration for the deeply religious archaeologist Charles Piazzi Smyth to go to Egypt to study and measure the pyramid, subsequently publishing his book Our Inheritance in the Great Pyramid (1864), claiming that the measurements he obtained from the Great Pyramid indicated a unit of length, the pyramid inch, equivalent to 1.001 British inches, that could have been the standard of measurement by the pyramid's architects. From this he extrapolated a number of other measurements, including the pyramid pint, the sacred cubit, and the pyramid scale of temperature.

Smyth claimed that the inch was a God-given measure handed down through the centuries from the 'Time of Israel', and that the architects of the pyramid could only have been directed by the hand of God. To support this Smyth said that, in measuring the pyramid, he found the number of inches in the perimeter of the base equalled 1000 times the number of days in a year, and found a numeric relationship between the height of the pyramid in inches to the distance from Earth to the Sun, measured in statute miles.

Smyth used this as an argument against the introduction of the metre in Britain, which he considered a product of the minds of atheistic French radicals.

== The grand scheme ==
By the time measurements of Mesopotamia were discovered, by doing various exercises of mathematics on the definitions of the major ancient measurement systems, various people (Jean-Adolphe Decourdemanche in 1909, August Oxé in 1942) came to the conclusion that the relationship between them was well planned.

Livio C. Stecchini claims in his A History of Measures:

The relation among the units of length can be explained by the ratio 15:16:17:18 among the four fundamental feet and cubits. Before I arrived at this discovery, Decourdemanche and Oxé discovered that the cubes of those units are related according to the conventional specific gravities of oil, water, wheat and barley.

Stecchini makes claims that imply that the Egyptian measures of length, originating from at least the 3rd millennium BC, were directly derived from the circumference of the earth with an amazing accuracy. According to "Secrets of the Great Pyramid" (p. 346), his claim is that the Egyptian measurement was equal to 40,075,000 meters, which compared to the International Spheroid of 40,076,596 meters gives an error of 0.004%. No consideration seems to be made to the question of, on purely technical and procedural grounds, how the early Egyptians, in defining their cubit, could have achieved a degree of accuracy that to our current knowledge can only be achieved with very sophisticated equipment and techniques.

== The megalithic system ==
Christopher Knight and Alan Butler further develop the work of Smyth's and Stecchini's "Grand Scheme" in their Civilization One hypothesis, which describes a megalithic system of units. This system is claimed to be the source of all standard units used by civilization, and is so named after the Neolithic builders of megaliths. Knight and Butler contend the reconstructed megalithic yard (1 MY = 0.82966 m) is a fundamental part of a megalithic system. Although the megalithic yard is the work of Alexander Thom, Knight and Butler make a novel contribution by speculating on how the MY may have been created by using a pendulum calibrated by observing Venus. It also explains the uniformity of the MY across large geographical areas. The accuracy claimed for this procedure is disputed by astronomers.

They derive measures of volume and mass from the megalithic yard, which is divided into 40 megalithic inches. Knight and Butler claim that a cube with a side of 4 megalithic inches has a volume equal to one imperial pint and weighs one imperial pound when filled with unpolished grain. They also posit ratio relationships with the imperial acre and square rod. Their book states that "The Sun, the Moon and the Earth all conform to a 'grand design' that is also evident in the Megalithic structures that are scattered across the British Isles and western Europe."

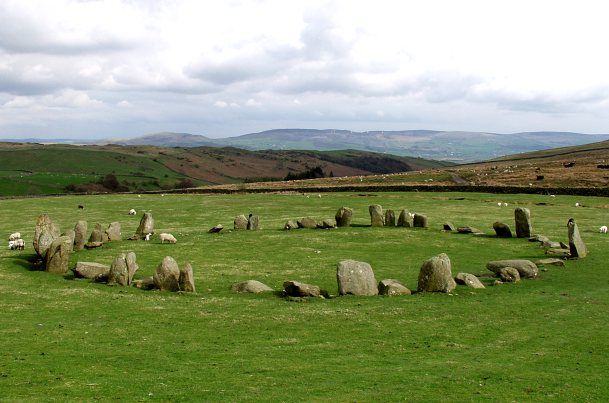
British stone circle at Swinside in Cumbria, which according to 366-geometry advocates displays in its dimensions an integral number of "Megalithic yards"

== "Megalithic geometry" ==
One of the first persons to associate megalith builders with geometry was the Scottish academic, Alexander Thom (1894–1985), who never hypothesised any 366-degree geometry himself. Thom believed that the megalith builders used a standard unit of measurement which he dubbed the megalithic yard. According to him, the length of this unit was 2.72 Imperial feet or 82.96 cm. The existence of this measurement is disputed.

According to Alan Butler this geometry was based on the Earth's polar circumference. The megalithic degree is the 366th part of it, i.e. 40,008 / 366 = 109.31 km; the megalithic arcminute is the 60th part of the megalithic degree, i.e. 109.31 / 60 = 1.82 km; the megalithic arcsecond is the 6th part of the megalithic minute, i.e. 1.82 / 6 = 0.3036 km; if this megalithic arcsecond is in turn divided into 366 equal segments, the length arrived at is 0.8296 m, which is the presumed length of the megalithic Yard, the supposedly ancient unit of measurement independently discovered by professor Alexander Thom in the 1950s. It is precisely this apparent coincidence that prompted Butler to think that the Megalith builders could have been cognizant with an Earth-based 366-degree geometry.

Clive Ruggles has said that both classical and Bayesian statistical reassessments of Thom's data "reached the conclusion that the evidence in favour of the MY was at best marginal, and that even if it does exist the uncertainty in our knowledge of its value is of the order of centimetres, far greater than the 1 mm precision claimed by Thom. In other words, the evidence presented by Thom could be adequately explained by, say, monuments being set out by pacing, with the 'unit' reflecting an average length of pace." David Kendall had previously argued that pacing would have created a greater difference in measurements between sites.

Douglas Heggie casts doubt on Thom's suggestion as well, stating that his careful analysis uncovered "little evidence for a highly accurate unit" and "little justification for the claim that a highly accurate unit was in use".

== Volumes and masses ==
In the book Civilization One, Butler and Knight contend that the basic units of volume and mass of the imperial system, the Imperial pint and the avoirdupois pound, are also derived from their Megalithic Yard. Just like the litre is the tenth part of the metre to the cubic power, the tenth part of the Megalithic Yard to the cubic power produces a volume of (82.96 cm/10)^{3} = 570.96 mL, a very close approximation of the modern pint of 568.26 mL. Similarly, they argue that this theoretical Megalithic pint, if filled with barley dry seeds, weighs on average a number close to 453.59 grams, which is the exact value of the avoirdupois pound.

They also argue that division of the Earth mass into 366 equal parts, then again into 60 equal parts, and then again into 6 equal parts, yields a result that is almost exactly 1×10^{20} lb: 5.9736×10^{24} kg/(366 × 60 × 6) = 4.5337×10^{19} kg = 0.9995×10^{20} lb.

Said differently, a one-Megalithic-arcsecond-thick 'slice' of Earth (at the equator) weighs almost exactly 1×10^{20} lb, as though, according to the authors, the exact value of the pound had been adjusted so as to be a round subdivision of a one-arcsecond-thick slice of Earth in the Megalithic geometry.

== Critical reception ==
Publications in pseudoscientific metrology receive little, if any, attention from mainstream scholarship, by nature of being intended for the popular mass market.

French historian Lucien Febvre, criticised Xavier Guichard's publication Eleusis Alesia: Enquête sur les origines de la civilisation européenne as "time and effort lost based on wordplay".

Alexander Thom's theories have been criticized by Ian O. Angell. W. R. Knorr, examining the evidence as presented by Thom, finds no real evidence of the Pythagorean theorem, the ellipse, or a standard unit of distance in Neolithic times. Karlene Jones-Bley also denies the existence of such a precise unit of measurement during the Neolithic period: "the suggestion put forth by Thom that there was a 'megalithic yard' uniform to 0.1 mm from Brittany to the Orkneys cannot be accepted". However, for R. J. C. Atkinson, the British prehistorian and archaeologist (1920–1994), the Megalithic yard as defined by Thom is a plausible notion: "An interesting theory is his notion of a megalithic yard and rod, supposedly fairly consistent in Britain and Brittany". According to the analytical methods employed by the British statisticians S.R. Broadbent and D.G. Kendall, Thom's 1955 dataset is unlikely to be the result of chance: "a 1% significance meaning that such a best fit would only occur in 1 in 100 random datasets". A review in The Guardian newspaper of Who Built the Moon by Butler and Knight refers to the authors as "an ad man specialising in consumer psychology and an engineer turned astrologer, astronomer and playwright". The review comments on their ideas about megalithic geometry "Here, they suggest, numerical ratios concerning sun, moon and Earth – neatly arrived at by applying the so-called principles of megalithic geometry – are evidence of a message for today's Earthlings. The message is that future humans conquered time travel and went back, way back, to construct the moon to ensure Earth orbits in precisely the right alignment to the Sun to encourage the evolution (yes, they believe in that) of humans – a Mobius strip theory of history. Oh, and they genetically engineered DNA (we know, because that's too complicated for nature alone)."

The first book to ever deal with the possible existence of a 366-degree circle and of a 366-day calendar (rather than speaking of "Megalithic geometry" or "Bronze Age geometry"), The Bronze Age Computer Disc by Alan Butler, has not been commented on either by mainstream scientists or the press.

Most scholars and reviewers label Butler and Knight's work as pseudoscience. Aubrey Burl, a much-published digger of Megalithic sites and a lecturer in archaeology at Hull College of Higher Education, although he coauthored a book with Thom, derided Thom's work, saying that he himself had never "seen a Megalithic Yard". Jason Colavito, in a review in Skeptic Magazine, wrote "Crammed into just over 250 pages are so many unbelievable assertions and unproven speculations that it would take a book-sized rebuttal to do adequate justice to this triumph of numerology over science." He also pointed out "The precision claimed for the length of the Megalithic Yard is surprising given the poor condition of Neolithic monuments today. It is impossible to record their measurements to the ten-thousandth of a millimeter, the standard apparently used to derive this unit of measurement."

Belgian author Robert Bauval, considers Butler and Knight's new discoveries as "major breakthroughs" and as "a stunning discovery [that] could completely change the way we view our remote past", whereas Graham Hancock praised the book, regarding it as "Absolutely fascinating, and very, very convincing."

== See also ==
- Pyramid inch
- Pseudoarchaeology
- Pseudohistory
- John Michell (writer)
- List of topics characterized as pseudoscience
