= Livio C. Stecchini =

Livio Catullo Stecchini (6 October 1913 – September 1979) was an Italian professor of ancient history at Paterson State Teachers College (now William Paterson University) in New Jersey. He wrote on the history of science, ancient weights and measures (metrology), and the history of cartography in antiquity. He is best known as a defender of the theories of Immanuel Velikovsky and for his numerological theories about the dimensions of the Great Pyramids.

== Career ==
Originally a classicist, he became a student of Angelo Segrè at the University of Catania, then attended the University of Freiburg, where he studied the philosophy of Husserl and attended the lectures of Heidegger and Oskar Becker. Eventually he focused on the work of Fritz Prinsheim which was concentrated on the contract of sale in ancient times. Had he known that in the hands of Kenneth Kitchen the sequence of blessings and curses in ancient contracts was eventually to become one of the most important dating tools of modern archaeology, Stecchini might not have focused on the clauses relating to measures. As it happened it was this focus that led Otto Lenel to allow him to read a paper on the length of miles in the Syro-Roman Law Book.

After the Freiburg group was disbanded by Hitler he returned to Italy where he received a doctorate in the field of Roman Law. He became assistant to the chair of history of Roman Law at the University of Rome and a member of the Institute of Roman and Oriental Law of that University where he was influenced by Edoardo Volterra holder of the chair of Oriental Law there.

He fled the Fascist regimes of Europe to the United States and worked for a doctorate in Ancient History at Harvard under Werner Jaeger. Jaeger suggested that he write his thesis on the concept of akribea or precision in Greek thought. His Ph.D. dissertation from 1946 was entitled "On the Origin of Money in Greece". From there, he went to the study of Greek monetary weights, the operation of Greek mints and the dimensions of Greek temples. From there he turned to the study of ancient geography and geodesy. His knowledge was specialized in agrarian measures in cuneiform tablets, rates of money exchange in Greek tablets, and the volume of jars in Egyptian papyri, cited in major periodicals such as Classical Philology. He also wrote more general works, some subsequently republished, such as his analysis of Herodotus in "The Persian Wars"

== Controversy ==
Stecchini's work included many controversial elements, and he complained he was ignored by fellow scholars. His defence of Immanuel Velikovsky in the September 1963 issue of American Behavioral Scientist (republished in 1966 as The Velikovsky Affair) undoubtedly also contributed to this.

Most scholars consider his unpublished work on metrology, based on his work on ancient numismatics, as numerology or pseudoscientific metrology. His method consists of starting with an assumption, namely that all ancient measures are by definition related. It is an old and intriguing idea, but one for which no proof has been found. Based on numerical analysis of data, he reaches his conclusion (in "A History of Measures"):

I have solved the inner rationale of ancient and medieval units of length, and by implication, of all units of measure, by discovering two facts:

a) that there were four fundamental types of foot related as 15:16:17:18,
b) that each of these types existed in two varieties related as the cube root of 24/the cube root of 25.

Stecchini's analysis of the geometry and methods for constructing the Great Pyramid were interpreted for a popular audience in Peter Tompkins' Secrets of the Great Pyramid with Stecchini's "Notes of the Relation of Ancient Measures to the Great Pyramid," in an appendix to the book.

== Bibliography ==
- Alfred de Grazia, Ralph E. Juergens, Stecchini L.C. (Eds.) (1978). The Velikovsky Affair - Scientism versus Science. 2ed., Metron Publications, Princeton, New Jersey. ISBN 0-349-10747-5
- Michael D. Gordin, The Pseudoscience Wars. Immanuel Velikovsky and the Birth of the Modern Fringe, 2012
