= Christopher Knight (author) =

British pseudoscience author

Christopher Knight is an author who has written several books dealing with pseudohistoric conspiracy theories such as 366-degree geometry and the origins of Freemasonry.

Knight's book Who Built the Moon?, co-written with Alan Butler, was the inspiration for the 2022 sci-fi film Moonfall.

== Books ==
Co-authored with Robert Lomas:

- The Hiram Key. 1996, Century. ISBN 978-0712685795
- The Second Messiah. 1997, Century. ISBN 978-0712677196
- The Holy Grail (Mysteries of the Ancient World). 1997, Weidenfeld and Nicolson. ISBN 978-0297823186
- Uriel's Machine. 1999, Century. ISBN 978-0712680073
- The Book Of Hiram. 2003, Century. ISBN 978-0712694384

Co-authored with Alan Butler

- Civilization One. 1999, Watkins Publishing. ISBN 978-1842930953
- Who Built the Moon?. 2005, Watkins Publishing. ISBN 978-1842931639
- Solomon's Power Brokers. 2007, Watkins Publishing. ISBN 978-1842931684
- Before the Pyramids. 2009, Watkins Publishing. ISBN 978-1906787387
- The Hiram Key Revisited. 2010, Watkins Publishing. ISBN 978-1907486135

== See also ==
- Archaeoastronomy
