= Tollmann's bolide hypothesis =

Hypothetical impact event

Tollmann's bolide hypothesis, proposed by Austrian palaeontologist Edith Kristan-Tollmann and geologist Alexander Tollmann in 1994, holds that one or more bolides struck the Earth around 7640 ± 200 BCE and that a smaller impact occurred around 3150 ± 200 BCE. The hypothesis proposes that the impacts produced catastrophic environmental effects, including megatsunamis penetrating far into the continents.

Quaternary geologists, paleoclimatologists, and planetary geologists specialising in meteorite and comet impacts have rejected the hypothesis. They argue that the evidence offered for it is more readily explained by ordinary geological processes, that many events attributed to the proposed impacts occurred hundreds to thousands of years outside the hypothesised dates, and that there is no credible physical evidence for the continent-scale megatsunamis and environmental devastation that the hypothesis predicts.

In particular, acidity spikes in Greenland ice cores cited as impact evidence have been attributed to volcanic eruptions, while Australasian tektites have been dated to about 790,000 years BP, far earlier than the proposed Holocene impacts. Marine sediments cited as evidence of catastrophic flooding can also be explained by post-glacial isostatic depression. The formation of salt lakes and salt flats cited in support of the hypothesis can be explained by evaporation in endorheic basins, and palaeoenvironmental records from North America and elsewhere do not show the widespread ecological disruption or tsunami deposits expected from the proposed megatsunamis.

== Scientific evaluation ==
Quaternary geologists, paleoclimatologists, and planetary geologists specialising in meteorite and comet impacts have rejected Tollmann's bolide hypothesis. They reject this hypothesis because:

1. The evidence offered to support the hypothesis can more readily be explained by more mundane and less dramatic geologic processes
2. Many of the events alleged to be associated with this impact occurred at the wrong time (i.e., many of the events occurred hundreds to thousands of years before or after the hypothesized impacts); and
3. There is a lack of any credible physical evidence for the cataclysmic environmental devastation and characteristic deposits that kilometre-high tsunamis would have created had they actually occurred.

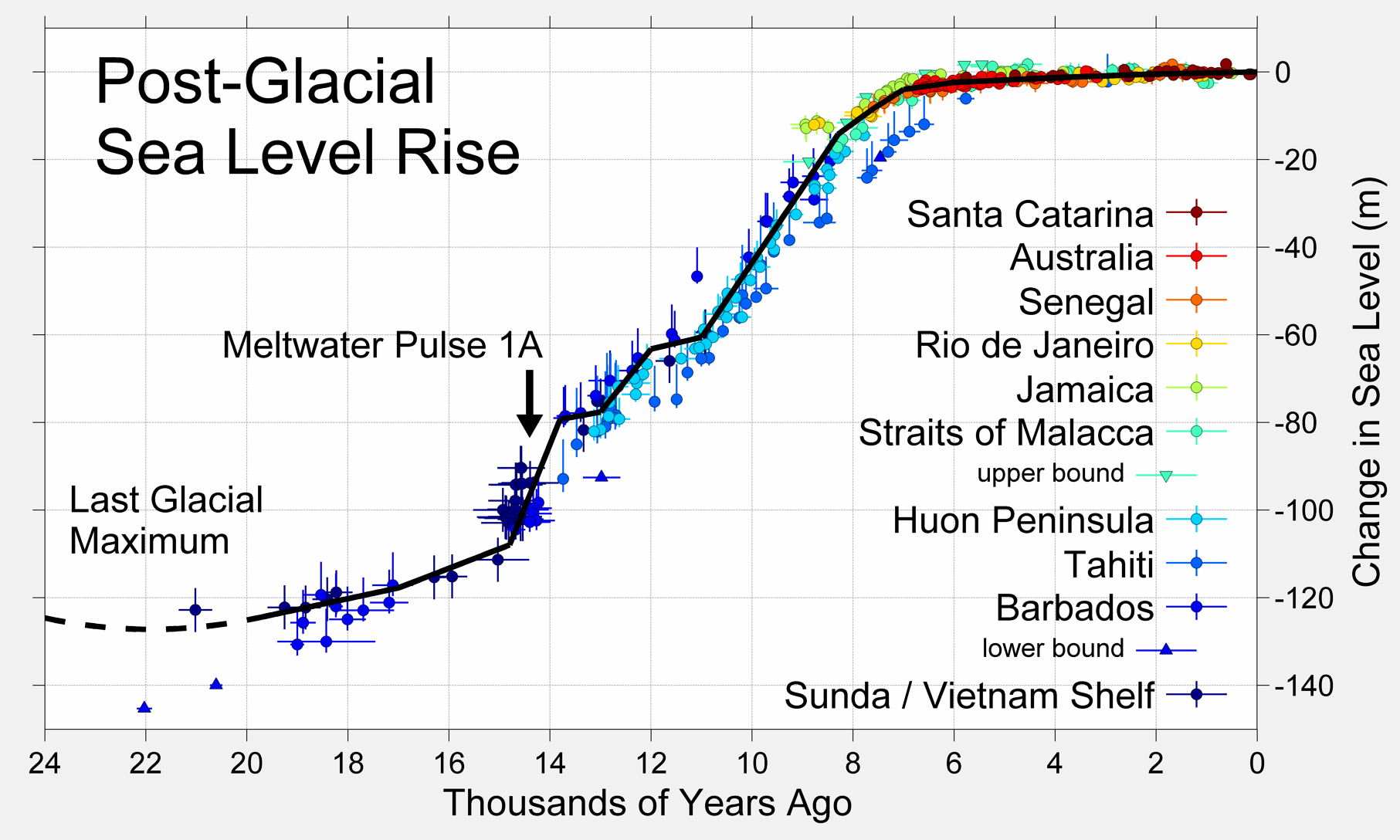
Global sea-level curve for the Late Pleistocene and Holocene

Evidence used by proponents of the Tollmann's bolide hypothesis to argue for catastrophic Holocene extinctions have alternative explanations by more frequently occurring geological processes. The chemical composition and presence of volcanic ash with the specific acidity spikes in the Greenland ice cores shows evidence that they result from volcanic instead of impact origins. Also, the largest acidity spikes found in Antarctica ice cores have been dated to 17,300 to 17,500 BP, which is significantly older than hypothetical Holocene impacts. The formation of modern salt lakes and salt flats is explained by the concentration of salts and other evaporite minerals by the evaporation of water from stream-fed lakes lacking external outlets, called endorheic lakes, which commonly occur in arid climates on both hemispheres on Earth. The composition of the salts and other evaporite minerals found in these lakes is consistent with their precipitation from dissolved material continually carried into the lakes by rivers and streams and subsequent concentration by evaporation, instead of evaporation of seawater. Whether a lake becomes salty or not depends on whether the lake lacks an outlet and the relative balance between the inflow and outflow of lake waters via evaporation. Ocean water accessing a continental lake as the result of a single catastrophic event, as Tollmann's hypothesis proposes, would contain an inadequate amount of dissolved minerals to produce, when evaporated, the vast quantities of salts and other evaporites found in the salt lakes, flats, and pans cited as evidence of a mega-tsunami by this hypothesis.

== Geological criticism ==
=== Isostatic rebound ===
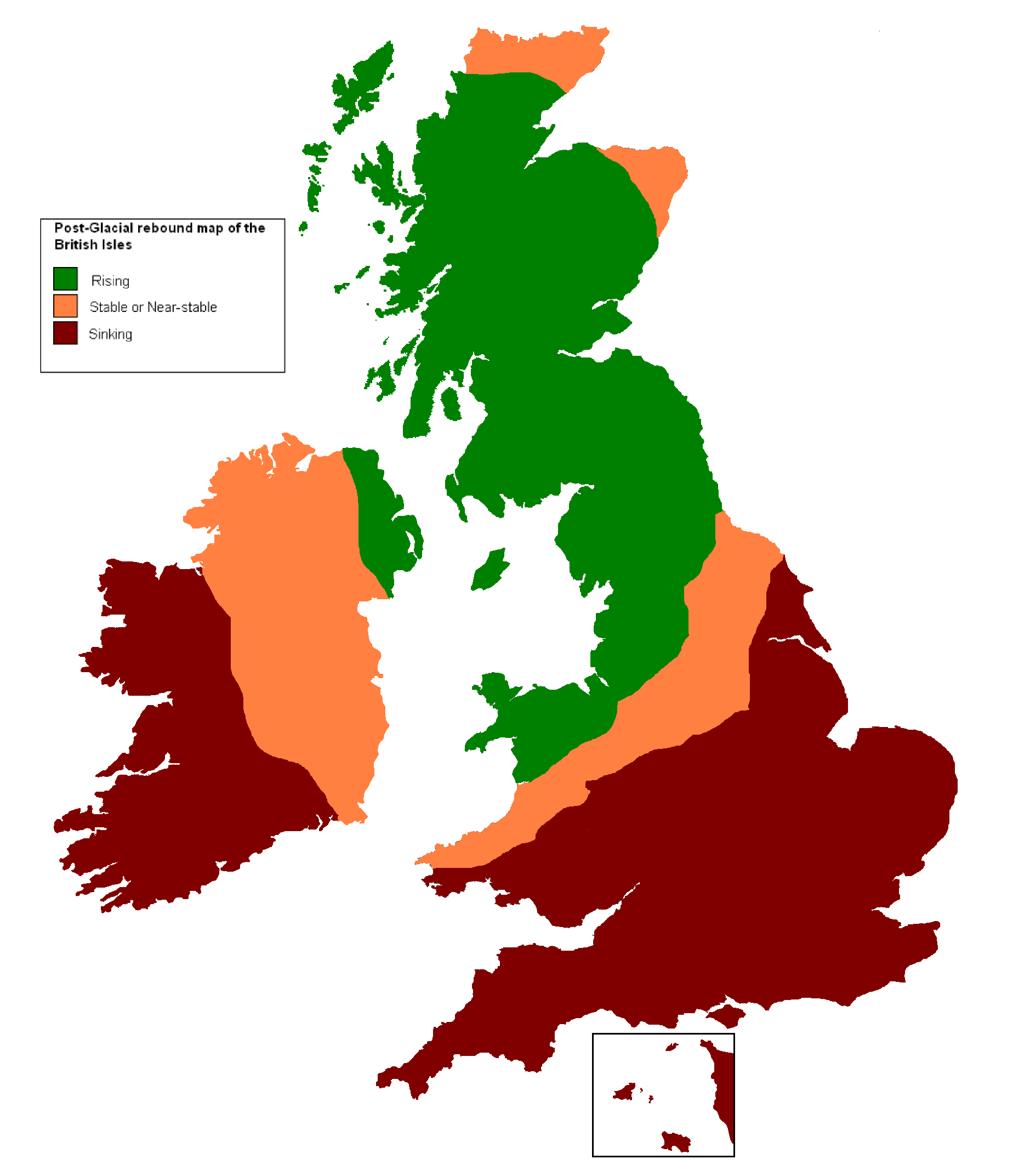
Isostatic rebound in the British Isles

Many published papers demonstrate that isostatic depression of the Earth's crust happened in the early Holocene. This process has led to submerging substantial portions of coastal areas adjacent to continental ice sheets and resulted in the accumulations of marine sediments and fossils within them. A well-documented example of flooding caused by isostatic depression is the case of Charlotte, The Vermont Whale, a fossil whale found in the deposits of the former Champlain Sea. As with many similar marine deposits, the sediments which accumulated within the Champlain Sea lack the physical characteristics—sedimentary structures, interlayers, and textures—that characterise sediments deposited by a mega-tsunami. These deposits and the associated fossils have been dated to significantly earlier periods than the times the bolide hypothesis proposed. In the case of the Champlain Sea, its sediments started to accumulate around 13,000 BP, almost 3,400 years before the oldest of the hypothesized Holocene bolide impacts.

=== Dating ===
Lake Bonneville and other ice age pluvial lakes (17,500 years BP), and modern remnants

A significant amount of the physical evidence used by Kristan-Tollmann and Tollmann, as supporting their hypothesis, is either too old or too young to have been created by this hypothesized impact. In many cases, it is hundreds to thousands, and in one case hundreds of thousands, of years too old to be credible evidence of a Holocene impact. The research that dates the tektites, which Tollmann's bolide hypothesis regards as indicative of the timing of the impact, is outdated. Later research, has dated the Australasian tektites to the Middle Pleistocene; about 790,000 years BP. In addition, the formation of salt lakes and salt flats is neither synchronous nor consistent with the hypothesized impacts having occurred about either 9,640 BP or 5,150 BP. For example, in the case of Lake Bonneville, Lake Lahontan, Mono Lake, and other Pleistocene pluvial lakes in the western United States, the transition to salt lakes and salt flats occurred at different times between 12,000 and 16,000 BP. Thus, the change from freshwater to salty water and eventually salt flats started over 2,400 to 6,400 years before the oldest of the impacts hypothesized by the Tollmann bolide hypothesis occurred. As a result, it is impossible that the formation of these salt lakes could have been associated with the impact hypothesized by Kristan-Tollmann and Tollmann.

== Megatsunami ==
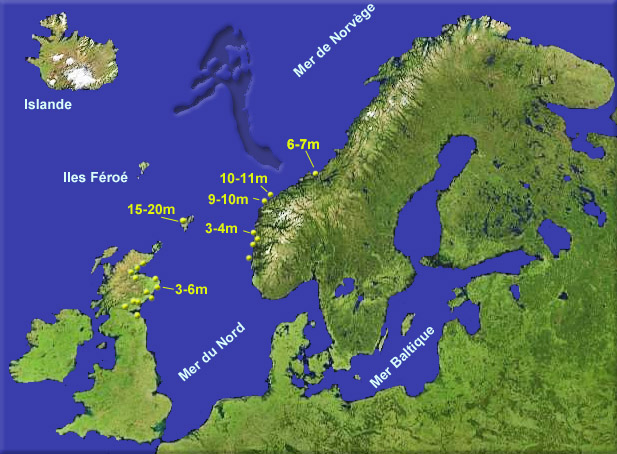
The megatsunami-producing Storegga Slide in Norway has been dated to approximately 6225–6170 BCE

There exists a lack of credible physical evidence of either multiple-kilometer-high tsunami waves penetrating deeply into continents, and the ecological devastation these would have caused. Thousands of paleoenvironmental records constructed from the study of lakes, bogs, mires, and river valleys all over the world by palynologists have not shown the existence of such a megatsunami. In the case of North America, research published by various authors provides detailed records of paleoenvironmental changes that have occurred throughout the last 10,000 to 15,000 years as reconstructed from pollen and other paleoenvironmental data from over a thousand sites throughout North America. These records do not recognise indications of either a resulting catastrophic environmental devastation or layers of tsunami deposits, which the mega-tsunamis postulated by Tollmann's bolide hypothesis would have created. Paleovegetation maps illustrate a distinct lack of the dramatic changes in North American paleovegetation during the Holocene, which would be expected from the cataclysmic ecological and physical destruction that a continent-wide mega-tsunamis would certainly have caused.

Grimm et al. in a paper published in Science in 1993, documented a 50,000-year-long record of environmental change by the analysis of pollen from an 18.5 m (61 ft) core from Lake Tulane in Highland county, Florida. Because of the low-lying nature of the peninsula, in which this part of Florida lies, this lake and the area around it would have been flooded and covered by tsunami deposits along with many of the other lakes and bogs described in there, and other publications. The forests and associated ecosystems of these areas would have been flooded and completely destroyed by the mega-tsunamis proposed by Kristan-Tollmann and Tollmann. Despite its location, both the core and the pollen record recovered from Lake Tulane lacks any indication of an abrupt, catastrophic environmental disruption, which the mega-tsunamis proposed by Tollmann's bolide hypothesis would have caused. Sedimentary cores obtained from Florida and other locations also lack sedimentary layers that have the characteristics of sediments deposited by either tsunamis or mega-tsunamis.

The cataclysmic scale of physical and ecological destruction that a megatsunami, like the one proposed by Kristan-Tollmann and Tollmann, would have caused, has not been recognised within the majority of long-term environmental records. Over a thousand cores from North America for which Holocene paleoclimatic and paleoenvironmental records have been reconstructed do not show evidence for the drastic environmental changes resulting from a large Holocene impact. There is a similar lack of evidence for mega-tsunami-related, Holocene, catastrophic environmental disruptions, and deposits reported from environmental records reconstructed from thousands of locations from all over the world. Other megatsunamis have been shown in coastal sediments analysed by geologists and palynologists and point to tsunamis locally caused by either earthquake, volcanic eruptions, or submarine slides. These non-impact related tsunamis show abundant records of their environmental effects through the study of pollen from cores and exposures.

Members of the Holocene Impact Working Group have published papers advocating the occurrence of mega-tsunamis created by extraterrestrial impacts at various times during the Holocene and Late Pleistocene. However, none of these proposed impacts match either the cataclysmic scale or timing proposed by Kristan-Tollmann and Tollmann for their hypothesized bolide.

== See also ==
- Timeline of environmental events
- Younger Dryas impact hypothesis
