= Charles William Heckethorn =

Swiss-born British author, and translator (c 1829–1902)

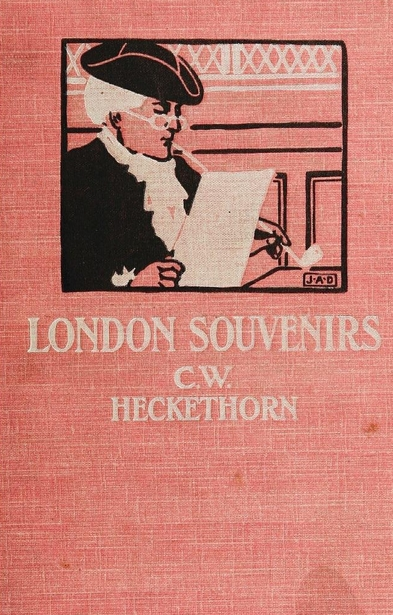
Cover of London Souvenirs, 1899.

Charles William Heckethorn (c. 1829 – 13 January 1902) was a Swiss-born, naturalized British, author best known for his history of secret societies which was produced in two editions and translated into German, and his works relating to the history of London.

== Personal life ==
Charles Heckethorn was born in Switzerland, around 1829. His early years appear to have been spent in Basel but he later moved to Britain and became a naturalised British citizen. In 1850 he was "Professor of French and German in Mr. Bass's School Ryde, Isle of Wight". He married Sarah Forsyth at St Mary-at-Lambeth in London in 1851. According to the 1901 census, the couple had a daughter, Wilhelmine J. Heckethorn, born around 1879. During the 1890s, Heckethorn was living at 67 South Lambeth Road, London. It appears that Sarah died as in 1895 he married Jane Baker in Lambeth.

== Writing ==
Heckethorn's first book was Exercises in French orthography, published in 1850 while he was working at Mr. Bass's School Ryde, Isle of Wight. He then produced a translation of The Frithjof Saga by Esaias Tegnér in 1856. He did not produce another book until 1875 (foreword dated 1874) when his two volume history, The secret societies of all ages and countries, was published. A second edition was published in 1897 and a German language edition in 1900.

In 1875, Heckethorn produced Roba d'Italia, or, Italian lights and shadows, an account of a journey through Italy, which was criticised by The Literary Review for plagiarising William Wetmore Story's Roba di Roma. The journal then alternately criticised and praised the book for its eccentric nature and digressions before heartily recommending it to its readers. The papal anecdotes were found to be amusing but a strong antithesis to the church was noted throughout the work that condemned the waste of teaching the dimensions of Solomon's temple while the "laws of nature and scientific truths" were neglected.

Heckethorn then produced books at regular intervals including poetry and children's stories, and a history of the Lincoln's Inn Fields area. His last work, London Souvenirs, was published in 1899 and contained a chapter on the history of South Lambeth Road. The book was criticised in The Spectator for its arrogant view of the past which condemned earlier generations as "barbarians in manners, and in morals reprobates" and contained the claim that "nothing will elevate man but science". The reviewer concluded by condemning the book as the work of a sciolist. The first American edition (1900) changed the title to "London Memories".

Heckethorn also pseudonymously co-authored, with Henry Vizetelly, The gambling world : anecdotic memories and stories of personal experience in the temples of hazard and speculation, with some mysteries and iniquities of stock exchange affairs.

== Death ==
Heckethorn died on 13 January 1902 at his home in South Lambeth Road, London. Probate was granted to his widow Jane Heckethorn on an estate of £222.

== Selected publications ==
- Exercises in French orthography, on a plan entirely new &c. Relfe & Fletcher, London, 1850.
- The Frithjof Saga ... Translated into English in the original metres. Trübner & Co., London, 1856.
- The secret societies of all ages and countries. Richard Bentley, London, 1875 (2 vols.) Vol. I, Vol. II. (Second 1897, Vol. I, Vol. II.) (German language edition Leipzig, 1900, translated by Leopold Katscher)
- Roba d'Italia, or, Italian lights and shadows: A record of travel. Samuel Tinsley, London, 1875.
- Roses and thorns: Poems. B. Dobell, London, 1888.
- The windmill and its secrets. A Dove Dale romance. Trübner & Co., London, 1888.
- The wondrous tale of Cocky, Clucky, and Cackle. Freely translated from the German of Brentano by C.W. Heckethorn. J. Hogg, London, 1889.
- Lincoln's Inn Fields and the localities adjacent: Their historical and topographical associations. Elliott Stock. London, 1896.
- The printers of Basle in the XV & XVI centuries: Their biographies, printed books and devices. Unwin, London, 1897.
- London souvenirs. Chatto & Windus, London, 1899.
- London memories, social, historical, and topographical. Chatto and Windus, London, 1900.
