= Robert Lomas =

British writer, physicist and business studies academic

Dr. Robert Lomas
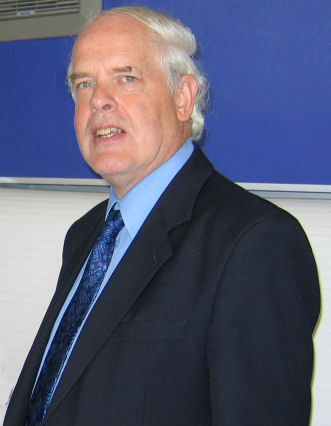
- Born: Robert Lomas; 1947 (age 78–79)
- Education: University of Salford
- Occupations: Author; speaker; physicist; retired fellow of University of Bradford
- Writing career
- Period: 1996–present
- Subjects: Freemasonry, Ancient Engineering, Archaeoastronomy, Daniel Owen
- Website: robertlomas.com

Robert Lomas is a British writer, physicist and business studies academic. He writes primarily about the history of Freemasonry as well as the Neolithic period, ancient engineering, and archaeoastronomy.

== Career ==
Lomas gained a First Class Honours degree in Electronic Engineering from the University of Salford before being awarded a PhD for his research into solid state physics and crystalline structures. From here he went on to work on electronic weapons systems and emergency services command and control systems.

He lectured on Information Systems at the University of Bradford's School of Management. According to his website, Lomas is a regular supporter of the Orkney International Science Festival, having lectured there, chaired sessions, and taken part in the school's support sessions over a period of eight years.

Outside of his academic specialities, Lomas has written on various topics, such as the Neolithic period, archaeoastronomy, ancient mysteries, stone monuments, and megaliths, and on astronomical and astrological topics, as well as the history, ritual, and spiritual journey of Freemasonry.

Elements of his work have been described as "hoaxes" by members of the Freemasonry community. For example, the redaction of a document called "The Masonic Testament" by Lomas and co-author Christopher Knight, in their Book of Hiram (2003), from fragments of old manuscripts and ritual, has been described as "An invention by the highly imaginative authors ... which has no historical validity". A review from The Square, reprinted on Lomas' website states that Turning the Hiram Key "should be viewed as an invitation to think, rather than a prescriptive statement".

== Bibliography ==
- The Masonic Tutor's Handbooks
1. Volume 1 - The Duties of an Apprentice Master Dowager Press (April 2020). ISBN 978-1086544381
2. Volume 2 - Freemasonry - After Covid 19 Dowager Press (April 2021). ISBN 979-8721123085
3. Volume 3 - Becoming a Craftsman Dowager Press (December 2021). ISBN 979-8483674221
- Classics of Masonic Writing
1. The Templar Genesis of Freemasonry: Turning The Templar Key Revisited Dowager Press (September 2018). ISBN 978-1718173699
- The Complete Works of W L Wilmshurest
1. W.L.Wilmshurst - The Ceremony of Initiation: Revisited by Robert Lomas Dowager Press (November 2013). ISBN 978-1493794591
2. W.L.Wilmshurst - The Ceremony of Passing: Revisited by Robert Lomas Dowager Press (March 2016).
- The keys Trilogy
1. Turning The Hiram Key: Making Darkness Visible. Lewis Masonic (April 2005). ISBN 978-0-85318-239-9
2. Turning the Solomon Key: George Washington, the Bright Morning Star and the Secrets of Masonic Astrology. Fair Winds Press (September 2006). ISBN 978-1-59233-229-8
3. Turning the Templar Key: The Secret Legacy of the Knights Templar and the Origins of Freemasonry. Lewis Masonic (October 2007). ISBN 978-0-85318-286-3
- The Pant Glas Children: Welsh Folk Tales Retold for my Children Dowager Press (March 2019). ISBN 978-1090181756
- Freemasonry for Beginners Illustrated edition (February 2017). ISBN 978-1939994561
- The Lewis Guide to Masonic Symbols Lewis Masonic (October 2013). ISBN 978-0853184362
- A Miscellany of Masonic Essays Dowager Press (December 2012).
- The Secret Power of Masonic Symbols: The Influence of Ancient Symbols on the Pivotal Moments in History and an Encyclopedia of All the Key Masonic Symbols Fair Winds Press (October 2011). ISBN 978-1592334506
- The Lost Key: The Supranatural Secrets of the Freemasons Hodder & Stoughton (June 2011). ISBN 978-1444710601
- Mastering Your Business Dissertation: How to Conceive, Research and Write a Good Business Dissertation. Routledge (February 2011). ISBN 978-0415596794
- The Secret Science of Masonic Initiation: Lewis Masonic (June 2009). ISBN 978-0-85318-318-1
- The Secrets of Freemasonry: A Suppressed Tradition Revealed. Constable and Robinson (May 2006). ISBN 978-1-84529-312-3
- Freemasonry and the Birth of Modern Science. Fair Winds Press (March 2003). ISBN 978-1-59233-011-9
- The Invisible College: The Royal Society, Freemasonry and the Birth of Modern Science. Headline Book Publishing (January 2002). ISBN 978-0-7472-3969-7
- The Man Who Invented The Twentieth Century: Nikola Tesla, Forgotten Genius of Electricity. Headline Book Publishing (January 1999). ISBN 978-0-7472-7588-6

=== With Geoffrey Lancaster ===
- Forecasting for Sales and Materials Management. Palgrave Macmillan (29 April 1985). ISBN 978-0-333-36583-0

=== With Christopher Knight ===
- The Book Of Hiram: Freemasonry, Venus and the Secret Key to the Life of Jesus. Element Books Ltd. (25 January 2004). ISBN 978-0-00-717468-3
- Uriel's Machine: The Prehistoric Technology That Survived the Flood. Century (10 June 1999). ISBN 978-0-7126-8007-3
- The Second Messiah: Templars, The Turin Shroud and the Great Secret of Freemasonry, April 1997 ISBN 0-7126-7719-4
- The Hiram Key: Pharaohs, Freemasons and the Discovery of the Secret Scrolls of Jesus. Century, London (1996). ISBN 978-1-931412-75-9

=== Translated works of Daniel Owen ===
- Rhys Lewis - Daniel Owen: Translated By Robert Lomas. QCS eBooks (January 2018) ISBN 978-1546721574
- Daniel Owen's Ten Nights in the Black Lion: A Serial in Seventeen Parts written in 1859 Dowager Press (October 2020) ISBN 979-8676846091
- The Seven Sermons of Daniel Owen: Offerings from Solitude (The Works of Daniel Owen) Dowager Press (March 2022) ISBN 979-8795412856

== See also ==
- Rosslyn Chapel
- Daniel Owen
- Uriel's Machine
