= Freemasonry in Scotland =

Freemasonry in Scotland in lodges chartered by the Grand Lodge of Scotland comprises the Scottish Masonic Constitution as regular Masonic jurisdiction for the majority of freemasons in Scotland. There are also lodges operating under the Scottish Masonic Constitution in countries outside of Scotland. Many of these are countries linked to Scotland and the United Kingdom through the Commonwealth of Nations and prior colonies and other settlements of the British Empire although there are several lodges in countries such as Lebanon, Belgium, Chile and Peru, which do not have such connections.

The Grand Lodge of Scotland is independent of, though in amity with, both of the other Grand Lodges established in the UK and Ireland, the United Grand Lodge of England and the Grand Lodge of Ireland. As of 2018, it consists of 32 provincial grand lodges in Scotland and 26 district grand lodges beyond the boundary of Scotland.

== History ==
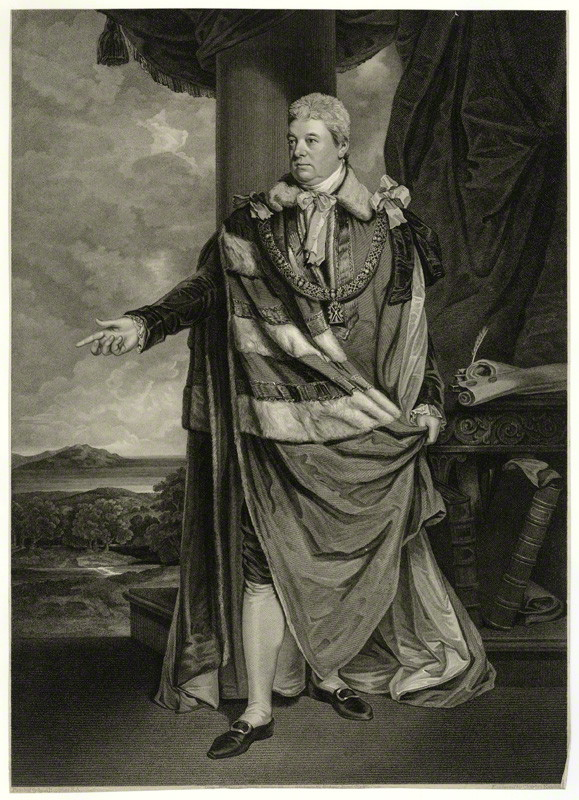
John Murray, 4th Duke of Atholl, the Scottish peer and Grand Master of the "Antients"

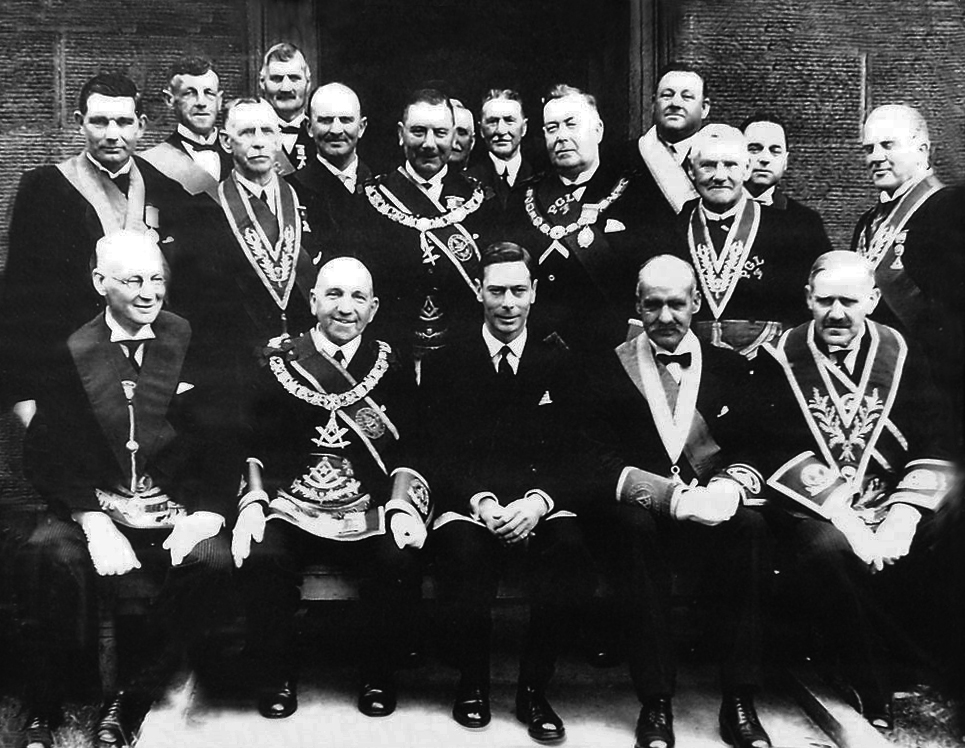
King George VI, former Grand Master Mason of the Grand Lodge of Scotland, with Scottish Freemasons

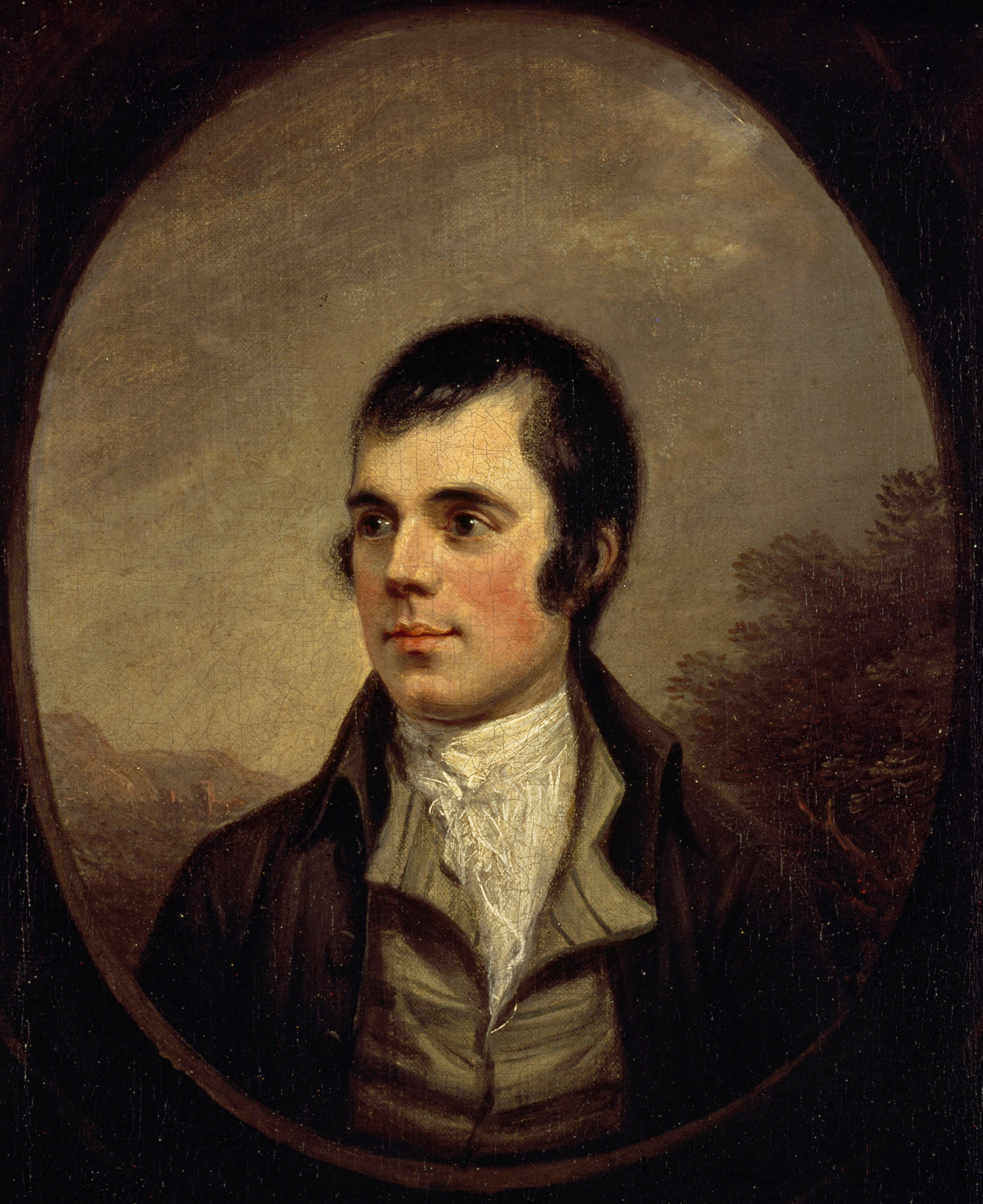
Robert Burns, member of several Scottish lodges (portraint by Alexander Nasmyth, 1787, detail)

It has been argued that regulated Freemasonry in Scotland is older than in any other part of the British Isles. The connection between the craft of stonemasonry and modern Freemasonry can be readily established in Scotland. This direct connection can be traced from the oldest Masonic written records in the world, which are the property of the Grand Lodge of Scotland in Edinburgh. These records are the meeting minutes of the Lodge of Edinburgh (Mary's Chapel) No.1 which date from 1599. Lodge Mother Kilwinning is number 0 on the Roll of the Grand Lodge of Scotland, and is reputed to be the oldest Lodge not only in Scotland, but the world. It is styled Mother Lodge of Scotland, attributing its origins to the 12th century, and is often called Mother Kilwinning.

The Lodge of Dunfermline, no. 26 on the Roll of the Grand Lodge of Scotland, and formally Lodge St John claims that it is one of the most ancient masonic lodges in Scotland.

It connects directly with "the Ludge of Masons of Dunfermling" which held St. Clair Charters in 1598 and 1628. It doubtless existed prior to these dates, which gives a fair assumption that it played a part in the addition to, Dunfermline Palace (1540). The earliest record in possession of the Lodge is dated 1698.

At the meeting in Edinburgh on 30 November 1736, when Grand Lodge was formed, the Lodge had three representatives, Captain Arthur Forbes of Pittencrieff (Master), Bailie Charles Chalmers, and Henry Finlay (Wardens), and was of course, in the original province of Fife, when formed in 1745. Interesting notes bearing on its antiquity are contained in a booklet issued in connection with the opening, of their new hall in Priory Lane (a Lodgeroom in excellent taste) which was consecrated by the P.G.M., the Earl of Elgin and Kincardine, on 17 December 1920, The hall is at present in use for national purposes making it difficult to gain access to old records. From the information available, the Secretary informs us that the date of the present Charter is 1766; that an early meeting place was the Spire Tavern c, 1814, and that the first R.W.M. was Lieut. Charles Durie.

In 1717 four Lodges in London agreed to form the Premier Grand Lodge of England. The private lodges it grew to represent also counted many Scots among their members, and the Earl of Crawford was Grand Master of the Premier Grand Lodge of England in 1734.

The Grand Lodge of Scotland was established in 1736, in a conscious effort to match the status of the Premier Grand Lodge of England.

When in the second quarter of the 18th century the Grand Lodge of England made changes to their ritual, this not only caused frictions between Grand Lodge and many unaffiliated lodges in England, but also took Freemasonry as practised in England and Wales out of step with the new Grand Lodges in Scotland and Ireland.

In 1751, a group of unaffiliated lodges of mainly Irish membership formed the Antient Grand Lodge of England, which grew in number of lodges and individual membership rapidly and also benefited from early recognition by the Grand Lodges of Scotland and Ireland.

In the ensuing competition for authenticity and historical accuracy of ritual, the newer English grand lodge became known for short as the "Antients", while the older English grand lodge was referred to as the "Moderns". In 1799, the Grand Lodge of Scotland supported the Duke of Atholl (Grand Master of the "Antients") and the Earl of Moira (Acting Grand Master of the "Moderns") to keep Freemasonry in the British Isles from being outlawed by British government legislation against secret societies.

In 1809 the "Moderns" started revising their ritual to a point where it was in step with the Antients, the Scots and the Irish. It was not until 1813 that the "Antients" and "Moderns" agreed on an Act of Union and formed the United Grand Lodge of England. While the conflict between the "Antients" and "Moderns" was to have a profound impact on Freemasonry as practised in England and Wales, it had comparatively little influence on Freemasonry in Ireland and Scotland. At the same time, Freemasonry in Scotland was able to maintain its distinct and unique character.

== Character ==
Freemasonry in Scotland has a character distinct from that practised in other parts of the British Isles. When the Grand Lodge of Scotland was founded in 1736, the majority of Masonic Lodges then in existence in Scotland did not engage with the new body. By their absence from the initial discussions to which these lodges had been invited, 79% did not support the creation of a new, centralised Masonic system as already existed in England and Wales and in Ireland. In addition, because all of the Lodges in Scotland pre-existed the new Grand Lodge at the time of its proposed formation, these had developed traditions and practices that they were reluctant to give up.

As a result, the new Grand Lodge of Scotland had to trade off any attempt at standardisation of ritual for the prospect of attracting the independent lodges to join the centralised system. In essence, Grand Lodge agreed not to interfere with local custom and practice as long as the lodges were willing to join the new Scottish Masonic Constitution.

Having guaranteed the principle of independence to those Lodges founded before 1736, it was considered impossible to deny Lodges founded after 1736 the same privilege. These were permitted to devise their own procedures, regalia, and distinctive rituals. This and subsequent developments ensured that Freemasonry in Scotland is far less standardised than in any other masonic jurisdiction.

== Organisation ==
Lodges under the Scottish Masonic Constitution are sovereign bodies in their own right, with a considerable degree of control of their own affairs. There is no single, standard Scottish ritual, and every Lodge under the Scottish Masonic Constitution has the right to devise its own ritual should it so wish. The operating principle is that a lodge ritual must contain the principal points of each Masonic degree and be subject to scrutiny by Grand Lodge. The various rituals in current use adhere to this principle, but the scope for variation and elaboration is considerable, with numerous interesting additions.

Lodges under the Scottish Masonic Constitution also have the right to choose the colours of the Lodge regalia, which may include one or more colours or incorporate traditional tartan patterns. The colours reserved for Provincial Grand Lodges and Grand Lodge itself are green and gold, although some older lodges also have these colours.

Craft Lodges under the Scottish Masonic Constitution offer the three traditional Masonic degrees and the Mark degree as well as the rank of Past (or Installed) Master. As in many other Masonic Constitutions, brethren in Scotland who have attained the degree of a Master Mason can choose to, or be invited to, extend their Masonic experience by taking further degrees in approved appendant bodies.

== Appendant bodies ==
Most Freemasons in Scotland choose to be advanced as Mark Master Masons after completing the three degrees of Craft Freemasonry, and the Mark degree is considered to be a part of the second of these degrees. However, a smaller number of Freemasons in Scotland subsequently apply to join the Holy Royal Arch and take their Mark degree in that body.

Under the Scottish Masonic Constitution, the Mark master's degree can be taken either within a Craft Lodge after having attained the degree of Master Mason, or within a Royal Arch Chapter, before taking the degree of Excellent Master. No one under the Scottish Masonic Constitution can be exalted as a Royal Arch Mason without previously having been advanced as a Mark Master Mason.

Under the terms of etiquette about inter-visitation between masonic Constitutions, English Royal Arch Masons are unable to attend a Royal Arch Chapter in Scotland during a Mark working unless they also hold that degree. In the English masonic constitution, the Mark degree is administered by a separate "Grand Lodge of Mark Master Masons" and it is not necessary for this degree to be held before joining the Royal Arch. The Excellent Master degree does not exist in England, and English Royal Arch Masons are not permitted to attend these workings in Scotland. They may also be unable to be present at a part of the Royal Arch working in Scotland which is no longer part of English Royal Arch ritual, although this is at the discretion of individual Chapters.

These restrictions do not apply to members of Royal Arch chapters in Ireland, Australia, New Zealand, and North America, as the Royal Arch as practised in these Constitutions is more fully compatible with Scottish practice.

There are several other orders open only to freemasons, of which the Knights Templar and Red Cross of Constantine are particularly popular in Scotland.

Membership of the Ancient and Accepted Scottish Rite and the Royal Order of Scotland are sought after but tightly-controlled and by invitation only.

Bodies of the Order of Knight Masons, the Allied Masonic Degrees and the Order of the Secret Monitor also exist in Scotland, but have comparatively small membership and, while not proscribed to Scottish masons, are not considered to be part of the Scottish masonic 'family'.

The Order of the Eastern Star, is a fraternal organisation for women who are related to a Freemason which also requires Masonic office bearers. It has declined in both Chapters and overall membership from its peak, but is still present in several areas of Scotland.

== Current Grand Office Bearers ==
The current Grand Master Mason is Brother Alexander C.G. Moncrieff, who was first installed in November 2025.

The current Grand Secretary, Brother William M. S. Semple, a retired senior police officer and business consultant.
