= Royal Order of Scotland =

Order within Freemasonry

Breast Star of a member of the Royal Order of Scotland.

The Royal Order of Scotland is an appendant order within the structures of Freemasonry. Membership is an honour extended to Freemasons by invitation. The Grand Lodge of the Royal Order of Scotland is headquartered in Edinburgh, with a total of 88 subordinate Provincial Grand Lodges; of these, the greatest concentration (more than a third) is in the British Isles, with the rest located in countries around the world.

== Organization ==
The order claims the King of Scots as hereditary Grand Master. The Deputy Grand Master and Governor of the order is currently Ewan Rutherford. He was installed as Deputy Grand Master & Governor (the administrator) of the Royal Order of Scotland at Edinburgh on 1 July 2022. In times in which there is no King of Scots, the Deputy Grand Master and Governor is the worldwide leader of the Order.

The Immediate Past Deputy Grand Master and Governor of the order is Sir Archibald Donald Orr-Ewing, 6th Baronet (b. 20 December 1938). Orr-Ewing is the eldest son of Sir Ronald Archibald Orr-Ewing, 5th Baronet and was educated at Gordonstoun and Trinity College, Dublin. He was the Grand Master Mason of the Grand Lodge of Antient, Free and Accepted Masons of Scotland, until 27 November 2008, a post he held since 2005. He previously held the post between 1999 and 2004, being the only person to hold that office twice. He was installed as Deputy Grand Master & Governor (the administrator) of the Royal Order of Scotland at Edinburgh on 3 July 2009.

Each Provincial Grand Lodge has a Provincial Grand Master, who usually governs for 5 years consecutively. The Provincial Grand Master will appoint Provincial officers annually.

Uniquely within Freemasonry, the Royal Order of Scotland has no local (or 'private') Lodges, and the Provincial Grand Lodge is the lowest tier of organisation and activity. New members are admitted in a Provincial Grand Lodge, or even in the Grand Lodge in Edinburgh.

In London (but not elsewhere in England) the Order is administered at the Provincial level from Mark Masons' Hall, and the officers of the Provincial Grand Lodge of London and Metropolitan Counties are selected largely from amongst the senior members of the various other Orders administered from that building.

== Ceremonies ==
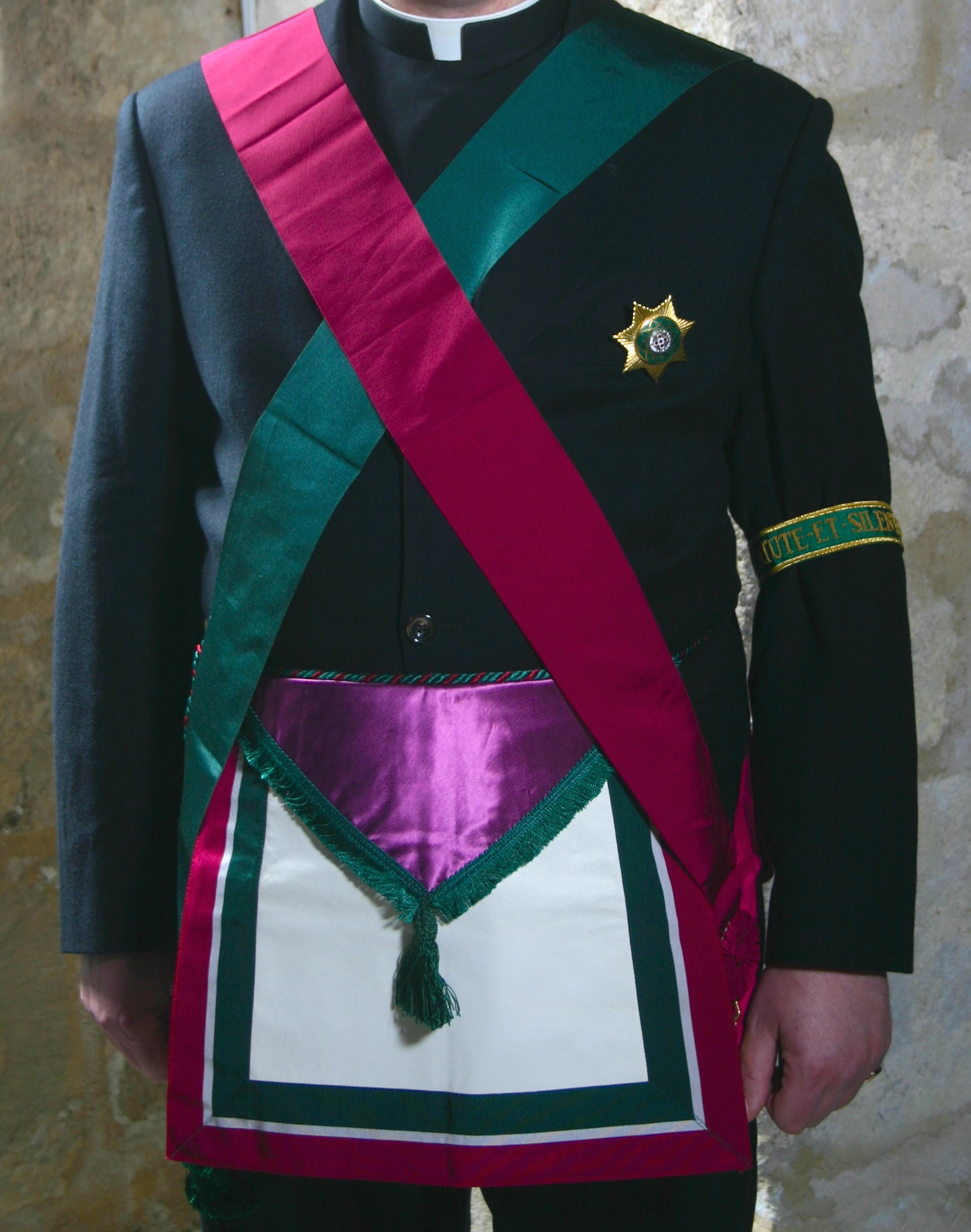
The regalia of the Royal Order of Scotland, as worn by a Chaplain of the Order.

The Royal Order of Scotland's Grand Lodge and the Provincial Grand Lodges confer two degrees:

- Heredom of Kilwinning
- Knight of the Rosy Cross

The ceremonies are usually learnt and rehearsed without scripts, and they include a considerable amount of rhyming verse. Elements of many other Masonic degrees and orders are incorporated into, or referenced within, the Royal Order of Scotland ceremonies.

== History ==
The order has existed since at least 1741, based on records in the archive of the Grand Lodge demonstrating activity in London, with a further charter being granted in 1750 to work the degree at The Hague. The holder of that warrant, William Mitchell, moved to Edinburgh around 1752/3, using the charter to establish a Provincial Grand Lodge there. In 1767 this body became the Grand Lodge of the Royal Order of Scotland.

Activity appears to have dwindled, with the Order nearing extinction in the early 19th century, but a resurgence culminated in the establishment of further Provincial Grand Lodges by 1843.

By 1819, the order was on the verge of extinction, but was "resuscitated" in 1839 by Houston Rigg Brown, a coach maker from Edinburgh, and George Arnott Walker Arnott, a renowned botanist.

The legends of the order date its origination to the reign of King David I in the 12th century in the Heredom degree, with the Rosy Cross degree originating in 1314 following the Battle of Bannockburn.

== Membership ==
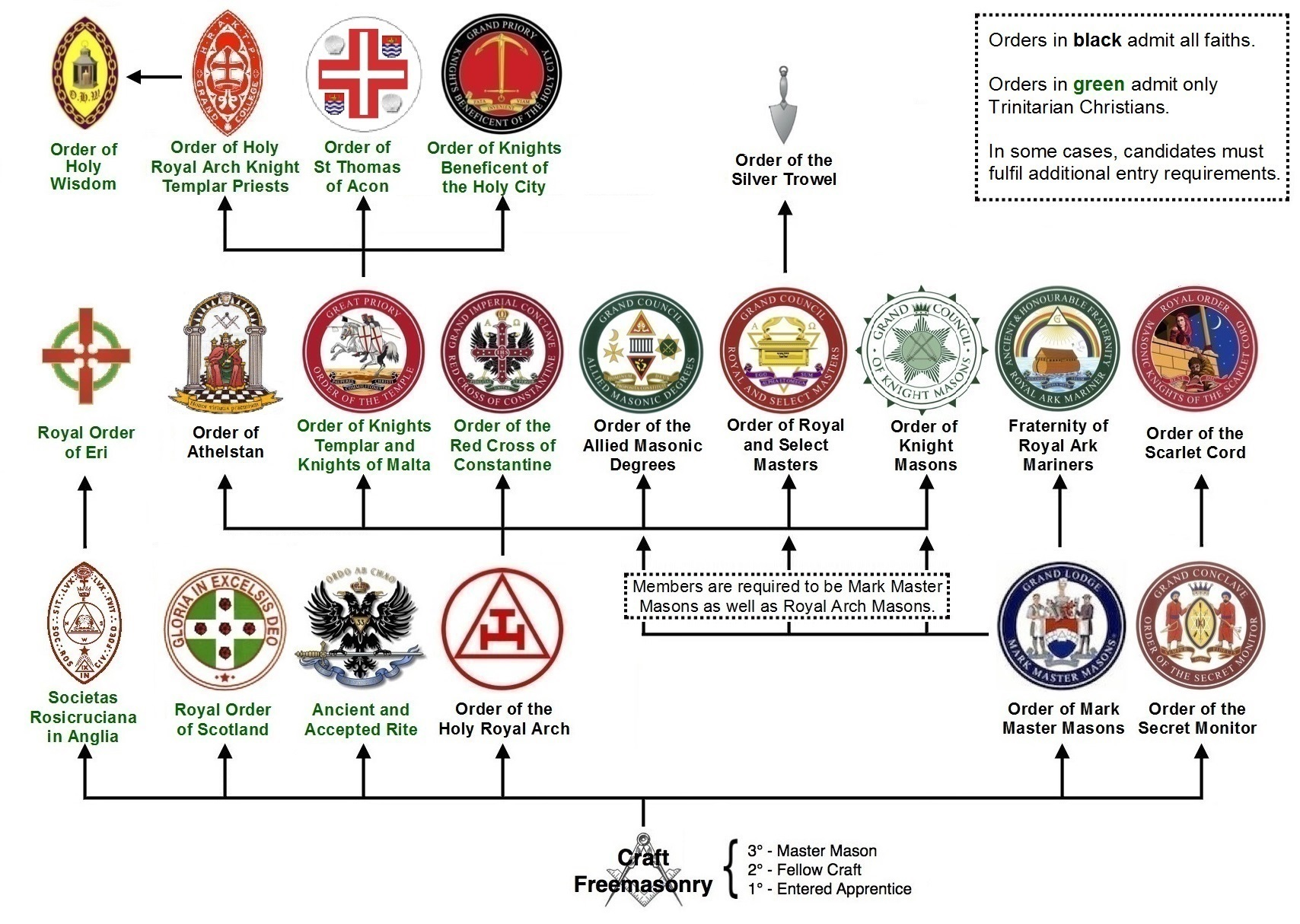
The position of the Royal Order of Scotland among the Masonic appendant bodies in England and Wales

The essential and universal qualifications for applicants are membership of the three degrees of Craft Freemasonry, five years or more continuous subscription to a St John's Lodge as a Master Mason, and profession of the Trinitarian Christian faith, these requirements cannot be altered by any Province. Membership is by invitation only.

Within the British Federation of Le Droit Humain, an applicant must hold the 18th degree of the Ancient and Accepted Scottish Rite, Sovereign Prince of Rose Croix of H.R.D.M. and be a Past Master of a Craft Lodge. Crucially, they do not have to profess the Trinitarian Christian faith, as this is not in accordance with the principles of the wider international Order.

In addition to these fundamental requirements, Provinces are free to impose additional conditions, and many do so, the most common being the requirement of membership of the Holy Royal Arch. Further qualifications for membership vary by provincial jurisdiction but may include a requirement of active membership of the 18th degree of the Ancient and Accepted Scottish Rite or one of the other Christian Masonic Orders (such as Red Cross of Constantine, or Knights Templar).

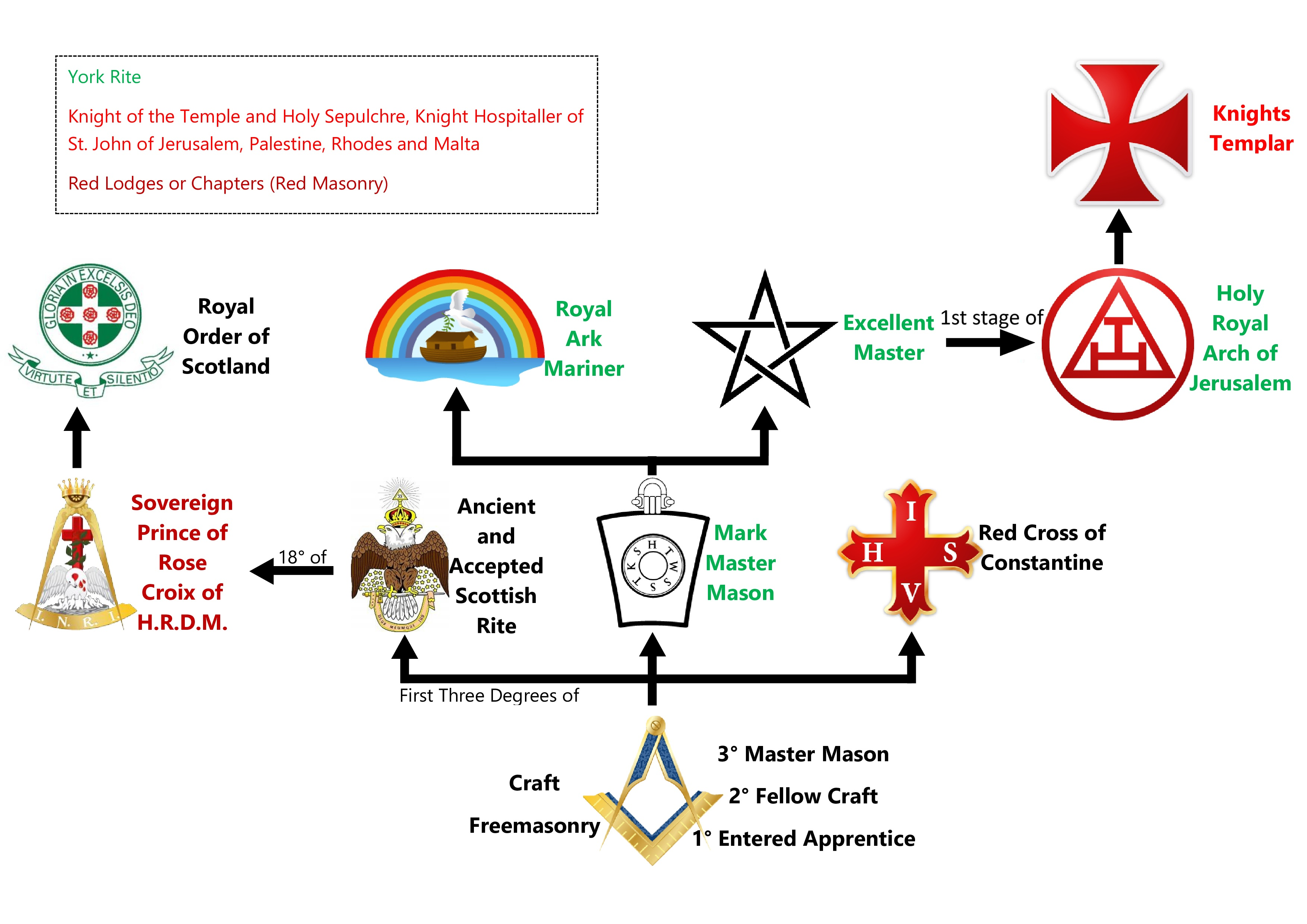
Position of the Royal Order of Scotland among the Allied Degrees of British Le Droit Humain

In the United States candidates should hold the 32nd degree of the Ancient and Accepted Scottish Rite, or be a Knight Templar within the York Rite system. Evidence is also required of services performed for the Craft, the Church, or the public (such as work with the Boy Scouts, the Order of DeMolay, Community drives, or similar types of service).

== See also ==
- Royal Order of Scotland in Sweden
- Freemasonry in Scotland
