= Royal and Select Masters =

Royal and Select Masters may refer to

- Cryptic Masonry, an element of the York Rite system of degrees in Freemasonry
- Order of Royal and Select Masters, a stand-alone organisation in Freemasonry
