= Mark Masons' Hall, London =

Freemasonry headquarters

Coordinates: 51°30′19″N 0°08′18″W

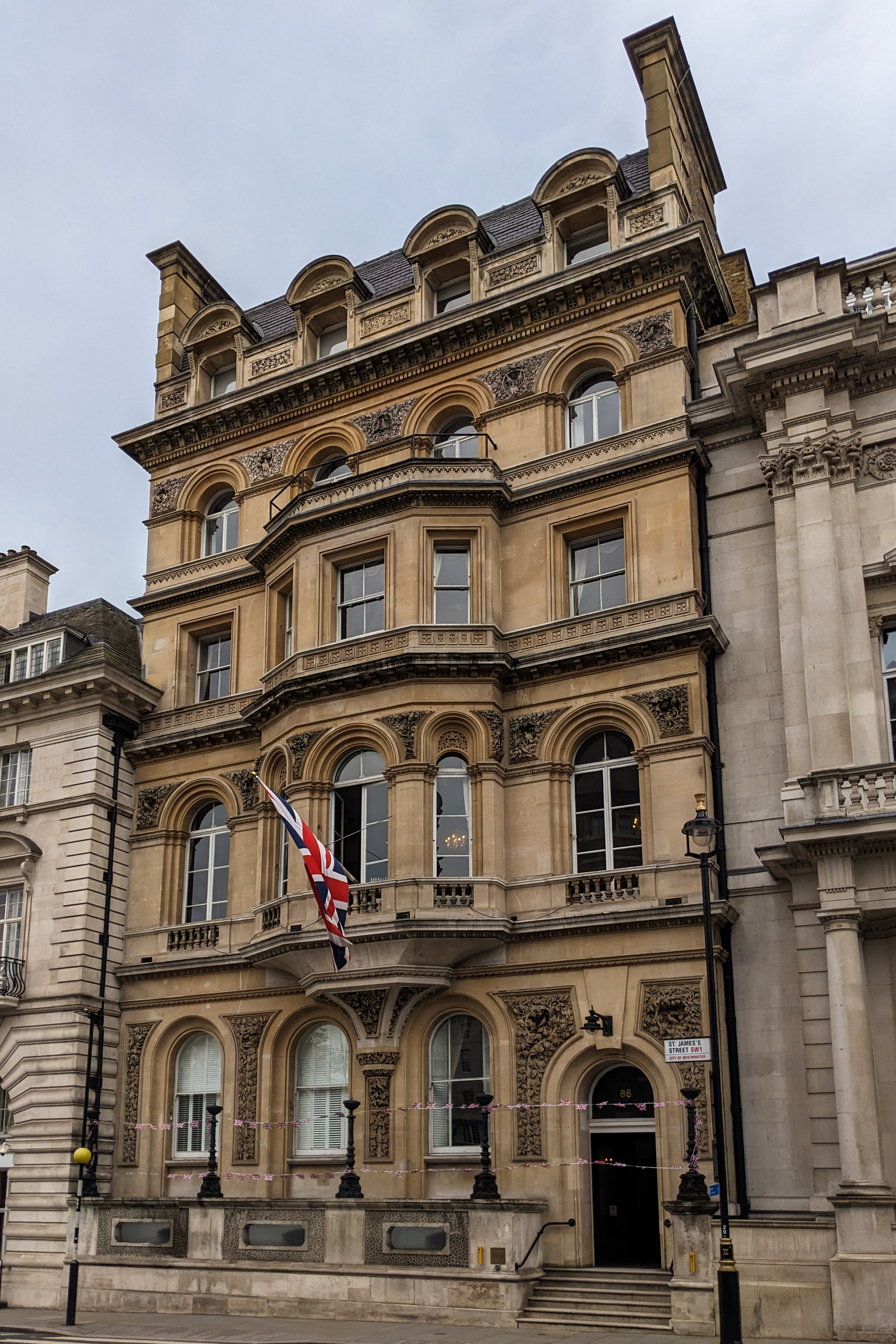
Mark Masons' Hall at 86 St James's Street, London

Mark Masons' Hall in Westminster, Greater London, is the headquarters of The Grand Lodge of Mark Master Masons of England and Wales, which is also responsible for the Royal Ark Mariner degree. It is located in 86 St James's Street in the district of St James's, opposite St James's Palace. While Freemasons' Hall is the headquarters of the United Grand Lodge of England and the Supreme Grand Chapter of Royal Arch Masons of England, Mark Masons' Hall is the home of several other important appendant orders of Freemasonry in England and Wales.

== History ==
=== Earlier buildings ===
The site of 86 St James's Street has been used for public houses and private clubs since the early 18th century. In 1702, the building was home to Williams' Coffee-House, a popular venue for the literati of the day. In 1749 the premises became a tavern. Following several other landlords, Richard John Atwood took on the lease in 1774 and ran the premises as a coffee house and a club. In 1772 he established a club called Atwood's which counted the historian and freemason Edward Gibbon among its members. In 1785 the house caught fire and was destroyed, but was rebuilt the following year. By 1801 the house at 86 St James's Street had become a public house, and was advertised as a place "where gentlemen meet on purpose to play at Billiards". After 1817 the Union Club was based here until the pub closed down in 1820, when the premises were taken over by Carey’s, the map makers. In February 1862 the building was demolished following a successful application to the Commissioners of Woods and Forests to erect a new building for a club House and chambers.

=== Current building ===
The present building at 86 St James's Street was built between 1862 and 1865 following a design by Sir James Thomas Knowles. From 1866 to 1869 it was occupied by a short-lived Civil Service Club with residential apartments on the upper floors. In 1870 the Thatched House Club became the occupiers of the premises and remained here until 1949. In 1950 the lease of 86 St James's Street was taken over by the Union Club, previously housed at 10 Carlton House Terrace which had been taken over for government use. In 1964, the Constitutional Club took over the lease and carried out extensive refurbishment. On 3 December 1977, The Grand Lodge of Mark Master Masons of England and Wales obtained a lease for a term of 99 years. The conversion works began on 18 February 1978 and were completed by July 1979. Mark Masons’ Hall was formally opened on 1 September 1979.

== Description ==
86 St James's Street is a Crown property and Grade II listed. At the time of its construction between 1862 and 1865, the building was described as "High Victorian". The property consists of seven levels which includes the lower ground floor and basement.

On the ground floor it consists of four bays which are all arched. The right hand bay at the top of a flight of stone steps provides the main double doorway entrance. The windows on the first and third floors are arched including the four stone dormer windows on the top floor. Above the steeply pitched slate roof at each side stand two tall rustic banded chimney stacks. The main entrance leads to a panelled entrance hall and a free standing staircase, constructed from stone steps with an open well and cast iron ornamental balustrade.

There are three large rooms on the ground floor, two of which are used as Masonic temples and the other a Board Room. On the first floor there is a front dining room which overlooks St James's Street as well as St James's Palace. The rear areas on this floor are used for dining and day time meetings. On the second floor, there is a licensed bar at the front. The rear areas on this floor house two more Masonic temples. The third floor houses three dining rooms and two further Masonic temples. The fourth floor is occupied by offices. The seven Masonic temples were all dedicated on 30 September 1980 and are named Grand Temple, Brazil, Bristol, Hong Kong, River Plate, Warwickshire and Johann Gutenberg.

== Headquarters ==
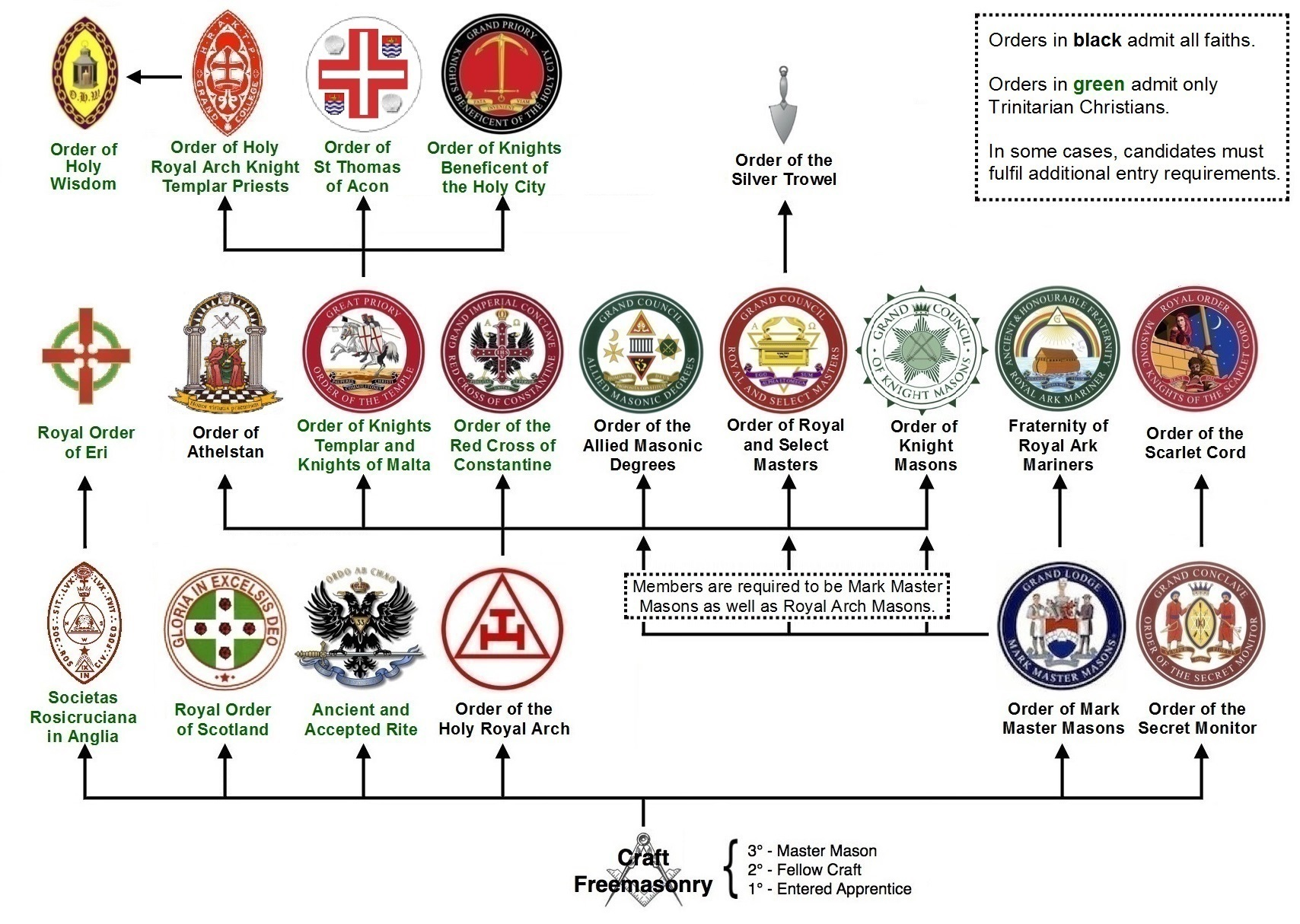
The structure of Masonic appendant bodies in England and Wales. A majority of the appendant Masonic bodies have their headquarters at Mark Masons' Hall.

The following appendant orders of Freemasonry in England and Wales have their headquarters at Mark Masons' Hall:

- Order of Mark Master Masons
- Ancient and Honourable Fraternity of Royal Ark Mariner
- Knights Templar and Knights of Malta
- Red Cross of Constantine
- Order of Royal and Select Masters
- Allied Masonic Degrees
- Order of the Secret Monitor
- Order of the Scarlet Cord
- Rectified Scottish Rite

Mark Masons' Hall also contains the administration of the Royal Order of Scotland for London, although not for Provinces elsewhere in England and Wales. In addition, there are two Order of Knight Masons councils meeting in the building, although all administration for the Order is carried out in Dublin; however, during 2016 a province for England and Wales was created, so the administration will be dealt with in England. There is also an unofficial connection with Ye Antient Order of Noble Corks, an informal "fun" degree dedicated to charitable fund raising, which was once strongly associated with Mark Masonry, as the members of the Great Board of Corks traditionally used to be senior Mark Master Masons.
