= Order of Quetzalcoatl =

Masonic invitational body

The Order of Quetzalcoatl, colloquially known as the "Q” is a Masonic appendant invitational body. It is heavily involved in philanthropy, and its main contribution is towards transportation funds for Shriners hospitals.

The Order, which was founded in Mexico City on March 14, 1945 by Arthur J. Elian, takes its name from the Aztec god Quetzalcoatl. Its chapters (called Teocallis, Nahuatl for "house of god") are located in the United States, Canada, Mexico, and Panama. All members of the Order, called Artisans, must be Shriners in good standing in their Shrine Temples.

The Order derives its terminology from Nahuatl, and its rituals are loosely based on Aztec ritual, including the use of the teponaztli war drum and the sacred drink, pulque.

== Organization ==
The Order is organized into local Teocallis, which are relatively autonomous and united under the Supreme Teocalli. Membership is by invitation only and is based on distinguished service to the Shrine Temples.

== Myth and Symbolism ==
Quetzalcoatl is often depicted as a feathered serpent with an open jaw, bifid tongue, and articulated spinal column. This iconic representation can be found on ancient monuments throughout Mexico. The name "Quetzalcoatl" originates from "Quetzal," a rare bird with green feathers, and "Coatl," meaning serpent. The quetzal bird was considered one of the most beautiful, and Quetzalcoatl is symbolized by the plumed serpent.

== Rituals and Degrees ==
The Order of Quetzalcoatl conducts rituals divided into three parts: Initiation (Artisan degree), Consecration (Master Artisan degree), and a pilgrimage to Mexican pyramids for consecration. These rituals combine instructive and symbolic elements, enhancing the member's experience. A candidate becomes a Coate when he is initiated into the order. Then he becomes an Artisan through a ritual ceremony. He may then advance to Master Artisan either through consecration ceremonies at the order’s annual business meeting (called a Feast of Fire) or through traveling to either the Temple of Quetzalcoatl at Teotihuacan in Mexico City or Chichen Itza near Cancún.

== Philanthropy ==
The Order supports philanthropic activities, with a particular focus on transportation funds for Shriner Hospitals for Children. The organization emphasizes combining fun and fellowship with a purpose.
