= Order of Knight Masons =

Chivalric Masonic order

The Emblem of the Order of Knight Masons

The Order of Knight Masons is a chivalric Masonic order, open to all Master Masons who are also members of a Mark Lodge and a Royal Arch Chapter. Members of the order meet in Councils of Knight Masons which are governed by the Grand Council of Knight Masons based in Dublin, Ireland. A member of the group is a Knight Mason.

The Order of Knight Masons is a system of three degrees, namely Knight of the Sword, Knight of the East, and Knight of the East and West. Councils of Knight Masons are individually presided over by an Excellent Chief and the degrees are conferred separately upon candidates. The Degrees communicate the story of the efforts to build the Second Temple in Jerusalem. They complete the sequence of universal Masonic degrees that are conferred within the Irish system.

== Councils of Knight Masons ==
Councils of Knight Masons are presided over by an Excellent Chief with two other senior officers, the Senior Knight and Junior Knight. When meeting officially, Knight Masons are permitted to form Councils of Knights of the Sword, or Councils of Knight of the East, or Councils of Knights of the East and West in order to confer those particular degrees, therefore the three degrees of Knight Masonry are conferred in three separate Councils, all operating within a Council of Knight Masons.

== Degrees ==
There are three degrees conferred within the Order of Knight Masons, all concerning the return of the Jewish people from the Babylonian captivity. The central character in all of the degrees is Zerubbabel. The three degrees are: Knight of the Sword, or Babylonian Pass, in which Zerubbabel seeks permission from King Cyrus to return to Jerusalem; Knight of the East, or Jordan Pass, which tells the story of Zerubbabel's return to Persia to seek the help of King Darius; and Knight of the East and West, or Royal Order, which represents the return of Zerubbabel to his countrymen in Jerusalem.

== History ==

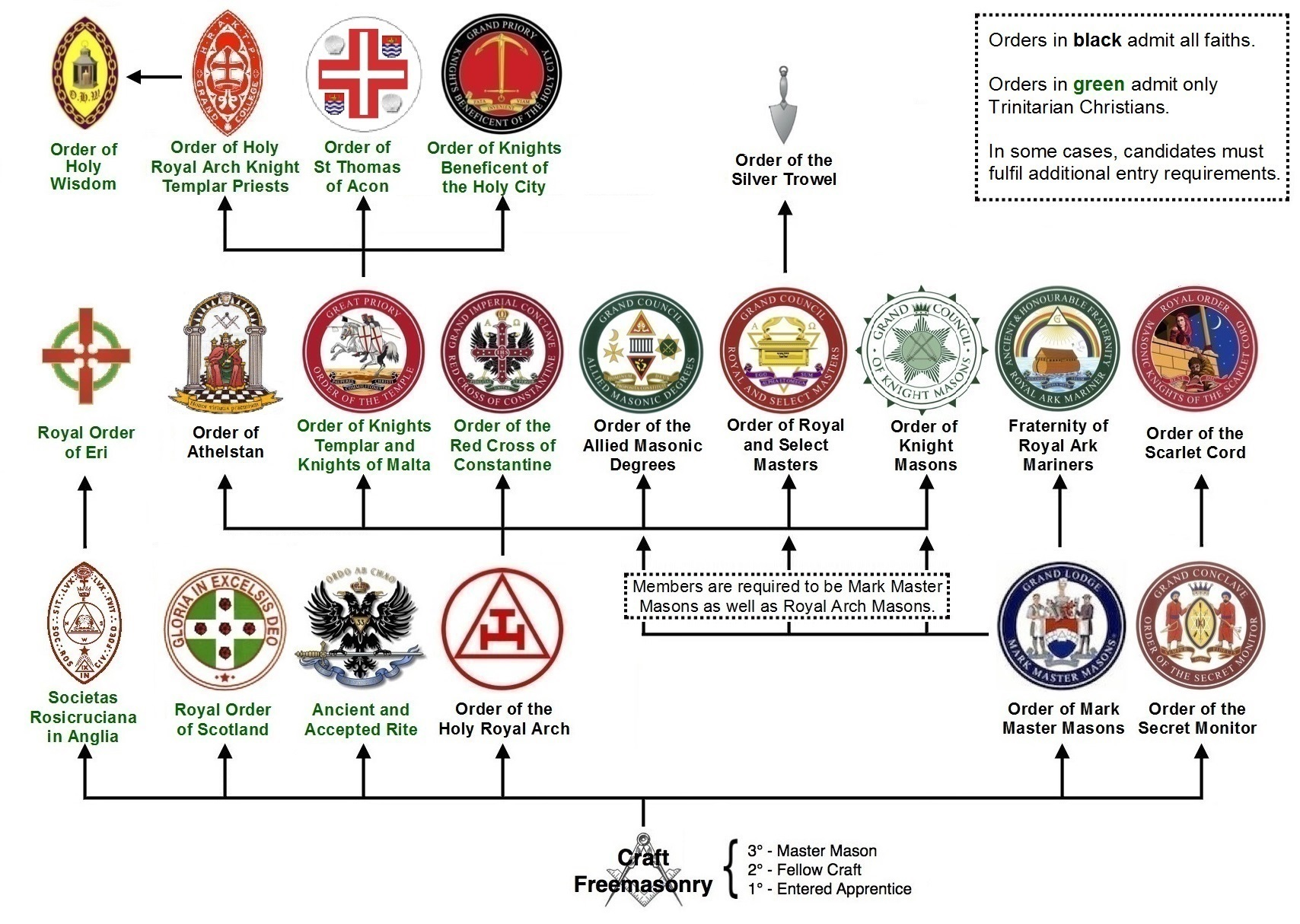
The position of the Order of Knight Masons among the Masonic appendant bodies in England and Wales

There are similar degrees in appendant orders within various Masonic systems throughout the world. For example, the Allied Masonic Degrees, America's York Rite, the Ancient and Accepted Scottish Rite and others have degrees that bear a close similarity to the Irish Knight Mason Degrees.

=== Ireland ===
In Ireland the degrees were being conferred within Masonic Knights Templar Preceptories until 1923. When compared to similar ceremonies, the Irish version of these degrees are very elaborate and exceptionally detailed, and it was decided that they should be given their own governing body and be allowed to practice independently of the Masonic Knights Templars. In 1923 within Freemasons' Hall in Dublin the first meeting of the Grand Council of Knight Masons took place and the consecration of new Councils to preserve the Knight Mason Degrees was planned.

=== United States ===
In the US, Knight Masonry quickly flourished and eventually some American Councils formed a separate Grand Council of the U.S.A. This Grand Council governs Councils within many States within the US, however access to American Councils is strictly by invitation only, within the York Rite. Councils in the State of Ohio did not join the new Grand Council of the USA, but have chosen to remain a province under the original (Irish) Grand Council.

=== England ===
In England there are two councils in London (meeting at Mark Masons' Hall), with others in Birmingham, Southend, Gillingham (Kent), Howden (Yorkshire), Gateshead, and Sutton (Surrey). During 2016, two new councils were constituted in England at Leeds, and Plymouth, with another later constituted at Leyland (Lancashire), taking the English total to eleven. The two local provinces are named "England & Wales (North)" and "England & Wales (South)", although there are no councils actually situated within Wales.

=== Israel ===
Knight of the Sword, Knight of the East, and Knight of the East & West are conferred as the "Degrees of Captivity" by the Supreme Grand Royal Arch Chapter of the State of Israel upon masons who have already received the Royal Arch degree. The degrees are conferred in English and in Hebrew. The English language ritual follows the Scottish model, while the Hebrew ritual is largely a translation of the Scottish.

=== Greece ===
In November 2008, fifteen brethren, members of the National Grand Lodge of Greece, subscribing Mark Master Masons and Royal Arch Masons, visited Dublin in order to receive the degrees of Knight Masonry, in a meeting of Babylon Council No. 6. They subsequently petitioned for a new Council of Knight Masons to be established in Athens. The petition was granted and Council Alethia No. 96 was duly constituted and dedicated in May 2009. Due to a rapid increase in members a new petition was submitted and granted for Council Eleftheria No. 99, which was constituted and dedicated in Pireaus in October 2011. A third Council, Amici Fedeli No. 106 was established in the island of Zakynthos, constituted and dedicated in September 2014. During the Grand Council Meeting on October 25, 2014 the Great Chief announced the creation of the Grand Council of Knight Masons' Province of Greece and the decision was approved per acclamation. The appointed Provincial Grand Officers were installed and proclaimed during the Grand Council Meeting on December 13, 2014. In February 2016, a fourth council was constituted and dedicated in Athens. Its members belong to various masonic constitutions, coming from different countries and all meetings will be conducted in English.

=== Other locations ===
Today, the Order of Knight Masons under the Grand Council of Knight Masons can be found all over the world. Councils can be found in across the globe in Australia, New Zealand, Israel, South Africa and India. New Councils continue to be founded, most recently in Bermuda, Greece and England. Qualification for membership is to have been Initiated, Passed and Raised in the Craft, Exalted into Royal Arch and Advanced to the rank of Mark Master Mason.
