= Ancient Egyptian Order of Sciots =

Masonic-affiliated fraternal organization

The Ancient Egyptian Order of Sciots (A.E.O.S.) is a Masonic-affiliated fraternal organization established in 1910. Dedicated to uniting Master Masons in a closer bond of Friendship, Fellowship, and Cooperation, the organization's motto is "To help each other in the accomplishment of honest endeavors" and to spread the doctrine of "BOOST ONE ANOTHER." Additionally, the Sciots are known for their commitment to supporting charitable causes, including the Sciots Foundation, which focuses on helping children with autism.

== History ==
The Sciots trace their origins to 1905 when a group of Masons in San Francisco formed a social club called the Boosters aimed at furthering Masonic principles outside the lodge. In 1910, the group was renamed the Ancient Egyptian Order of Sciots, or Sciots for short.

The name Sciots comes from the Greek island of Scio/Chios. According to Sciot legend, around 1124 BCE the democratic inhabitants of Scio formed a religious association called the Amphictyony or "League of Neighbors". When the Egyptians learned of their principles of democracy and fraternity, the Pharaoh invited them to Egypt where they became followers. The rituals and symbolism of the Sciots are based on this ancient legend.

The organization aims to unite Master Masons in friendship, fellowship and cooperation by "boosting one another". It has 17 local units in California and other states.

== Organization ==
The Sciots are governed by the Supreme Pyramid, composed of representatives from Subordinate Pyramids. Local units are called Subordinate Pyramids, each with its own officers and activities. The supreme head is the Pharaoh.

Officers have Egyptian titles like Toparch (president), Mobib (vice president), Armeses (orator), and Pastophori (lecturer).

== Rituals and symbolism ==
The Ancient Egyptian Order of Sciots (AEOS) bases its ritualistic practices on a historical event purported to have taken place in 1124 B.C., approximately six decades subsequent to the collapse of Troy. During this period, the Sciots, under the governance of the Greeks, were recognized for their robust commitment to democratic principles. This commitment culminated in the establishment of a cooperative entity known as the “League of Neighbors.” As members of this league, the Sciots exemplified the essence of fraternity in their interactions. The Pharaoh of Egypt, profoundly moved by their conduct, extended an invitation to the Sciots to visit his royal residence. This marked the beginning of a profound friendship between the Egyptians and the Sciots. Consequently, every third lunar cycle, the Sciots would embark on a journey to the palace where they were received with great hospitality and engaged in celebratory feasting and merriment. The AEOS ritual is centered around this legend, hence its degree is referred to as the “League of Neighbors.”

Symbols include the pyramid, the sphinx, and the sun god Ra. Members use secret handshakes, signs, and passwords tracing back to 1124 BCE.

Regalia and uniforms resemble those of the Shriners. The Sciots sponsored some of the first Masonic youth groups like DeMolay starting in 1923.

== Structure and activities ==
The Ancient Egyptian Order of Sciots is organized into local units known as "Pyramids," each with its own officers and activities. The highest authority is the "Supreme Pyramid," which meets annually. Sciots engage in a wide range of activities, including monthly social events, DeMolay chapter sponsorship, bands and drill teams, and various forms of entertainment.

== Membership ==
Membership in the Ancient Egyptian Order of Sciots is open to all Master Masons in good standing. Applicants are required to petition for membership and commit to attending their Blue Lodge at least once a month. While membership numbers have fluctuated over the years, the organization continues to uphold its motto of "Boost One Another."

== Charitable initiatives ==
The Sciots are dedicated to charitable work and community service. The organization's Sciots Foundation is particularly focused on supporting research and activities related to children, with a specific emphasis on those affected by autism. The Sciots Foundation collaborates with institutions such as the UC Davis MIND Institute to further understand, prevent, and treat neurodevelopmental disorders.

== Local and national presence ==
As of today, the Ancient Egyptian Order of Sciots has established numerous Pyramids across California, as well as in New Jersey and Illinois. Plans are in motion to expand to other states, including Arizona, New York, Florida, and Nevada.

== Membership ==
Membership is open to Master Masons in good standing. In 1979 there were around 1,800 members.

== See also ==
- Masonic lodge
- Mystic Order of Veiled Prophets of the Enchanted Realm
- Ancient Arabic Order of the Nobles of the Mystic Shrine
- Scottish Rite
- Masonic bodies
- Rite of Memphis-Misraim
