= Masonic bodies =

Auxiliary organization of Freemasonry

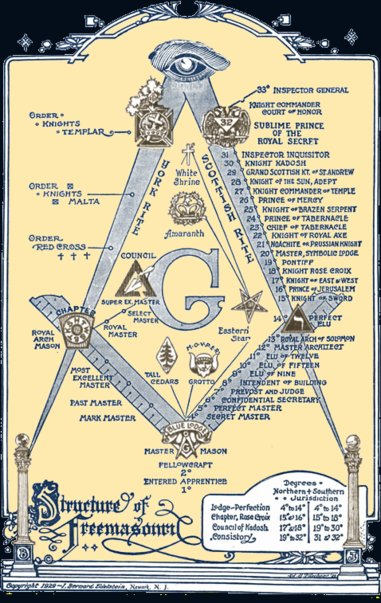
Diagram of two major masonic bodies in the United States

There are many organisations and orders which form part of the widespread fraternity of Freemasonry, each having its own structure and terminology. Collectively, these may be referred to as Masonic bodies, Masonic orders, Concordant bodies, or appendant bodies of Freemasonry.

== Differences between Rites or Concordant bodies and Appendant bodies ==
A "Rite" or "concordant body" in Freemasonry is a system that includes various Masonic degrees, or ceremonies for initiating a newcomer. Some Rites include the three blue Lodge degrees (Entered Apprentice, Fellowcraft and Master Mason), others do not (only offering degrees after Master Mason). In contrast, an "Appendant body" is an organization that is affiliated with Freemasonry and recognized by the Grand Lodge, however, members are not necessarily considered Freemasons. Appendant bodies do not include a system of Blue Lodge degrees or upper/side degrees.

== Overview of relationships between Masonic organisations ==
The basic unit of Freemasonry is the Masonic Lodge, which alone can "make" (initiate) a Freemason. Such lodges are controlled by a Grand Lodge with national or regional authority for all lodges within its territory. A masonic lodge confers the three masonic degrees of Entered Apprentice, Fellowcraft (or Fellow Craft), and Master Mason. Whilst there is no degree in Freemasonry higher than that of Master Mason, there are additional degrees that are offered only to those who are Master Masons. Most of these are supervised by their own "Grand" bodies (independent from the Grand Lodge).

The United Grand Lodge of England (which has no direct authority over other Grand Lodges, but as the world's oldest Grand Lodge, has a historical influence in terms of regularity and practice) defines "pure, ancient Freemasonry" as consisting of the three degrees of Entered Apprentice, Fellowcraft, and Master Mason, including the supreme Order of the Holy Royal Arch. The degree of the Holy Royal Arch is of great antiquity, and has a special importance in many masonic systems, including those of all three of the oldest 'Constitutions' (masonic authorities), namely the Grand Lodges of England, Scotland, and Ireland, in all of which it is considered (by varying constitutional definitions) to be the completion of the mainstream masonic structure.

A number of other organisations, most of which are known as 'masonic' or have a title identifying themselves as masonic, require candidates for membership to be a Master Mason in "good standing" (subscriptions paid, and not under any form of discipline). In some countries, notably the United States of America, the Scottish Rite and the York Rite are the two principal routes available. In other countries, notably England, Scotland, Ireland, and many of the countries of the Commonwealth, a large number of 'stand-alone' Orders and Degrees exist, without the umbrella organisation of a "rite". Some of these masonic bodies use numbers as an informal way of referring to or identifying the degrees they confer, but the most important and therefore "highest" degree is always the third, or Degree of Master Mason. These other masonic bodies (sometimes known as 'additional degrees' or 'side degrees') are optional pursuits for those who wish to take their masonic membership and activity beyond the three degrees of Entered Apprentice, Fellowcraft and Master Mason.

== History ==
Sometime before 1730, a trigradal system (that is, a system of three grades or degrees) started to emerge in Freemasonry, which quickly became the standard system in the lodges of England, Ireland and Scotland. This seems to have been accomplished by the rearrangement and expansion of the original bigradal system, particularly by the elaboration of the Hiramic legend, and its full exposition in the third degree, that of a Master Mason. The emergence in the 1740s of "chivalric" degrees on the continent may be linked to the deliberate "gentrification" of Freemasonry in Chevalier Ramsay's Oration of 1737.

The formation of the Royal Arch occurred in the same period, developing the Hiramic theme with the rediscovery of the secrets lost with the death of the master builder. The Premier Grand Lodge of England (the "Moderns") remained ambivalent about the new rite, perhaps because a secret password was taken from their own third degree. The Moderns' supporters of the new rite formed their own Grand Chapter, probably in 1765. There is evidence that the official date of 1767 is the result of the alteration of the foundation document, to save Lord Blayney the embarrassment of founding a controversial organisation while he was still the Moderns' Grand Master. The prime mover in the formation of the Grand Chapter was Caledonian Lodge, a lodge of Scottish Masons which had just joined the Moderns from the Ancients, and whose members included William Preston.

In 1751, as the Moderns increasingly alienated unaffiliated lodges, a few (mainly Irish) lodges in London formed the Ancient Grand Lodge of England (the "Ancients"), which rapidly became an umbrella organisation for unaffiliated lodges in England. Their second secretary, Laurence Dermott, believed the Royal Arch to be the fourth degree. When the two Grand Lodges merged in 1813, Article Two of the Articles of Union agreed that "pure Antient Masonry consists of three Degrees and no more, viz., those of the Entered Apprentice, the Fellow Craft and the Master Mason, including the Supreme Order of the Holy Royal Arch".

The Grand Chapter remained, but other degrees from this time had to be administered by separate Masonic Bodies. The period from 1740 to 1813 saw a host of Masonic rites, orders and degrees emerge. These new rituals enlarged the scope of Masonry and encompassed many elaborations, some of which included elements which had previously been practiced within the craft. Many rites proved to be transient and died out (some being no more than a written record without evidence of having been practiced), but some proved more resilient and survived.

== Rites, orders, and degrees ==
=== England and Wales ===
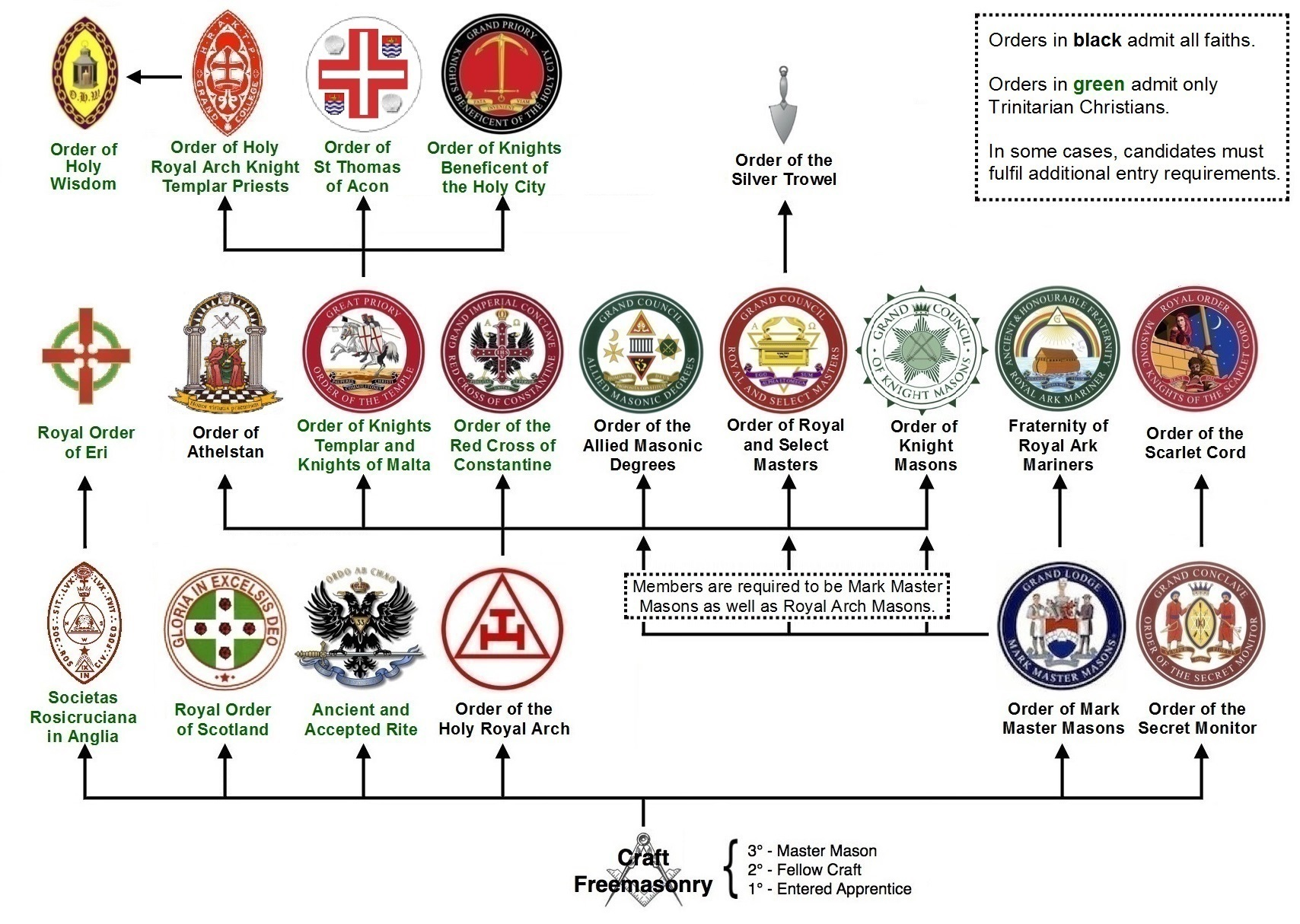
Organisation of Masonic appendant bodies in England and Wales

In England and Wales, after the degrees of craft freemasonry, there are a large number of separately administered degrees and orders open only to craft freemasons. Under the English Constitution, the Holy Royal Arch is the only degree formally recognised by the United Grand Lodge of England (UGLE) beyond the three degrees of craft freemasonry. Other orders and degrees are however referred to and acknowledged by the Grand Master of the United Grand Lodge of England, and all their members are necessarily masons subject to the English Constitution. Of Masonic appendant bodies, the following are among the most popular:

- The Holy Royal Arch in England and Wales is practiced as a stand-alone degree, separate from Craft Freemasonry. Members meet in Royal Arch Chapters, which are each attached to a Craft Lodge and also bear the same number. The Order is administered by the Supreme Grand Chapter, which is based at the headquarters of the United Grand Lodge of England in Freemasons' Hall, London, and also has many officers in common with it. Craft lodges in England and Wales normally have a Royal Arch Representative, and newly raised Master Masons are actively encouraged to seek exaltation into the Holy Royal Arch before considering membership of any further Masonic organisation.
- The Order of Mark Master Masons. Under the English Constitution this degree is only conferred in Mark Masons' Lodges, which are independent from the United Grand Lodge of England and administered from Mark Masons' Hall, London. Within the Order, members may also join the Royal Ark Mariners.
- The Societas Rosicruciana in Anglia. An esoteric society that meets in Colleges, aspirants are required to be a Master Mason and to believe in the Christian Holy Trinity.
- The Order of the Secret Monitor. Under the English Constitution, the Order meets in Conclaves, each with a Supreme Ruler at its head. The Order is administered from Mark Masons' Hall, London. Within the Order, members may also join the Order of the Scarlet Cord.
- The Ancient and Accepted Rite for England and Wales, colloquially known as "Rose Croix". Under the English Constitution, the Rite meets in Chapters Rose Croix and is open to all Master Masons. Candidates are 'perfected' in the 18th degree, with the preceding degrees awarded in name only. Continuing to the 30th degree and beyond is restricted to those who have served in the chair of the Chapter. The Order is administered by the 'Supreme Council 33° for England and Wales' in London.
- The Knights Templar. Membership is by invitation only. Candidates are required to be Master Masons, Royal Arch Masons, and to believe in the Christian Holy Trinity. Knights Templar meet in Preceptories. The Order is administered from Mark Masons' Hall, London; members may also join the Knights of Malta or the Knight Templar Priests.
- The Order of Royal and Select Masters is administered from Mark Masons' Hall, London. It works the degrees of Select Master, Royal Master, Most Excellent Master and Super-Excellent Master which show the link between the degrees of Master Mason, Mark Master Mason and the Holy Royal Arch.
- The Order of the Red Cross of Constantine, the Holy Sepulchre and of St John the Evangelist, colloquially known as the "Red Cross of Constantine". Candidates are required to be Master Masons, Royal Arch Masons, and to believe in the Christian Holy Trinity. Members meet as a Conclave. The Order works three degrees, and also administers two distinct appendant orders which are both Christian in character. The Order is administered from Mark Masons' Hall, London.
- The Allied Masonic Degrees, a group of five formerly independent degrees, are conferred by invitation only. Candidates are required to be Master Masons, Royal Arch Masons and Mark Masons. Members may also be invited to join the Order of Knight Masons. The Order meets in Councils and is administered from Mark Masons' Hall, London.

=== Scotland ===
The governing bodies are the Grand Lodge of Scotland and the Supreme Grand Royal Arch Chapter of Scotland. Under the Scottish Masonic Constitution, the Mark master's degree can be taken either within a Craft Lodge after having attained the degree of Master Mason, or within a Royal Arch Chapter, before taking the degree of Excellent Master. No one under the Scottish Masonic Constitution can be exalted as a Royal Arch Mason without previously having been advanced as a Mark Master Mason. A number of other orders are open to craft freemasons, of which the following are notable in Scotland:

- The Royal Order of Scotland
- The Ancient and Accepted Scottish Rite
- The Masonic Knights Templar
- The Red Cross of Constantine, which works five degrees.

=== United States ===
In the United States there are two main sets of side degrees:

- The Ancient and Accepted Scottish Rite of Freemasonry.
- The York Rite (sometimes called the American Rite), which, together with the craft lodge, comprises three separate and distinct bodies: the Royal Arch Chapter (Capitular Masonry), the Council of Royal & Select Masters (Cryptic Masonry) and the Commandery of the Knights Templar.

==== Other Appendant bodies ====
- The York Rite Sovereign College of North America – An invitational body dedicated to the assistance and promotion of York Rite Bodies and degree work. The presiding body is a college, and the presiding officer is a Governor, titled Preeminent. The body works one main degree, that of Order of Knight of York, and one honorary degree, that of Order of the Purple Cross of York.

=== Canada ===
In Canada there are two main Masonic appendant bodies:

- The York Rite, being the older of the two, which, aside from the craft lodge, comprises four separate and distinct bodies: the Royal Arch Chapter (Capitular Masonry), the Council of Royal & Select Masters (Cryptic Masonry), the Commandery of the Knights Templar, and the York Rite College. The York Rite also includes Priories of Knights of the York Cross of Honor, Tabernacles of the Holy Royal Arch Knight Templar Priests and Order of Holy Wisdom, and Councils of the Allied Masonic Degrees of Canada.
- The Ancient and Accepted Scottish Rite of Freemasonry.

=== Ireland ===
In Ireland, after the Craft degrees conferred under the authority of the Grand Lodge of Ireland there are a number of degrees and orders that are administered separately and are open to Master Masons either by petition or by invitation.

- The Royal Arch in Ireland is unique, and regarded widely as being the oldest Royal Arch working in the world. Members of Royal Arch in England, Scotland or America would notice a great many differences in the theme of the degree from what they are used to. Royal Arch Chapters in Ireland can meet as Lodges of Mark Master Masons to confer the Mark Degree on a candidate. This must be done before a candidate is given the Royal Arch Degree. Irish Royal Arch chapters operate under the Supreme Grand Royal Arch Chapter of Ireland and both the Mark Master Masons and Royal Arch degrees are recognised by Grand Lodge as being part of "pure, ancient Freemasonry."
- The Knight Mason degrees make up the last part of "Universal" Irish Freemasonry. They are open to any member of the Craft and Royal Arch. They are frequently known in other constitutions as the Red Cross Degrees, namely, Knight of the Sword (formally Red Cross of Babylon or Red Cross of Daniel), Knight of the East (formally Jordan Pass), and Knight of the East and West (formally Royal Order). These degrees had previously been administered by Knights Templar Preceptories and some Royal Arch Chapters. In 1923 the Grand Council of Knight Masons was established to support and preserve the Degrees and the Councils that confer them. Irish Knight Masonry is now a worldwide masonic body and is continuing to grow. The Degrees practiced under the Grand Council of Knight Masons are conferred in the correct chronological order and are given in far greater detail than any similar body anywhere else in the world. In other jurisdictions, it is invitational.

==== Invitational Degrees ====
- The Military Order of the Temple, often known as the Masonic Knights Templar, confers Knight Templar and Knight of Malta degrees. Membership of the Order of the Temple is strictly invitational.
- The Ancient and Accepted Rite of Ireland has strict requirements for membership. It is by invitation only and membership of Knight Templar is required. The degree structure is extremely close to the more famous Scottish Rite in America; however, as in the Ancient and Accepted Rite in England, progression through each individual degree is by invitation only.

=== Nordic Europe ===
In Scandinavia and the Nordic states, including Sweden, Norway, Iceland, Denmark, and Finland, Freemasonry exists mostly in the form of the Swedish Rite.

=== France ===
The French Rite is strong in France, Luxembourg, Greece, Brazil, and formerly Louisiana.

=== Other orders and degrees ===
The following affiliated and appendant bodies confer Masonic degrees. Those who petition or are invited to membership must be at least Master Masons, although each body may have additional qualifications for membership:

- Allied Masonic Degrees. In the U.S., councils of the A.M.D. exemplify twelve Masonic degrees. In Canada, councils exemplify nine degrees in addition to the installation ceremony. In England, councils confer only five degrees.
- Ye Antient Order of Noble Corks. A humorous side degree. In Scotland it is associated with Royal Arch Masonry. In England and Europe it is a stand-alone order. In the US it is part of the Allied Masonic Degrees.
- The Knight Masons. Councils of Knight Masons across most of the globe operate under the Grand Council of Knight Masons, based in Ireland. In Scotland the degrees are worked in the combined order (along with the Royal Ark Mariner degree) titled the Lodge and Council, and are controlled by the Supreme Grand Royal Arch Chapter of Scotland. In the US, the degrees are, with some exceptions, governed by the Grand Council of Knight Masons of the U.S.A. which broke away from the first Grand Council during the 1950s.
- Royal Order of Scotland. The Grand Lodge of the Royal Order at Edinburgh, Scotland, controls approximately 85 Provincial Grand Lodges around the world, and confers two degrees.
- The Rectified Scottish Rite, known as CBCS from its highest exoteric rank, Chevaliers Bienfaisants de la Cite Sainte, or Knights Beneficent of the Holy City.
- Societas Rosicruciana. Colleges confer nine degrees, or "grades".
- Order of St. Thomas of Acon. A commemorative chivalric order. Organized in "chapels".
- Operative Masonry (The Worshipful Society of Free Masons, Rough Masons, Wallers, Slaters, Paviors, Plaisterers and Bricklayers). A discrete Masonic group on Invitation only that claims to be the original Guild Stone Mason descendant and hold the original rituals and presentations.

== Appendant bodies ==
In Freemasonry, an Appendant body is any organization that does not contain a system of initiatory degrees (Rite or concordant body), these organizations are appendant to freemasonry, every Grand Lodge has its own list of approved Appendant bodies thus this list may vary depending on the Grand Lodge jurisdiction. These affiliated bodies and youth organisations are commonly found in North and Central America, and to a lesser degree in South America. They are not generally present in Europe, except in localised areas of American influence, particularly areas of long term American military presence.

=== Ancient Egyptian Order of Sciots ===
The Ancient Egyptian Order of Sciots is a fraternal organization that was founded in the United States in 1911. The order is dedicated to spreading fun and good cheer among its members, which it refers to as "Pyramids". The organization is known for its distinctive Egyptian-themed rituals and symbolism. It's structured into local units, also known as "Pyramids", and members work together to organize social and charitable activities. The order's motto is "Boost One Another".

=== Society of Blue Friars ===
The Society of Blue Friars, also known as S.B.F., is a unique Masonic organization established in 1932 with the explicit purpose of recognizing Masonic authors. It is widely regarded as one of the smallest and most distinctive appendant bodies within Freemasonry.

=== Shriners ===
Shriners International, historically known as the Ancient Arabic Order of the Nobles of the Mystic Shrine (A.A.O.N.M.S.). Shriners meet in Shrine "centers" or "temples," and are well known for their maroon fezzes, lavish parades, and sponsorship of children's hospitals.

==== Attached to Shriners ====
- Royal Order of Jesters (R.O.J.) Colloquially known as "Jesters," local "courts" are limited to thirteen initiates yearly. Initiation, by invitation and unanimous ballot, is limited to members in good standing of the Shrine.
- Order of Quetzalcoatl. The "Q", or the Order of Quetzalcoatl, is an invitational only body within the Masonic fraternity. This organization, which was established by Arthur J. in Mexico City on 14 March 1945, is renowned for its philanthropic endeavors. Its primary charitable contribution is providing transportation funds for Shriners hospitals.

==== Shriner Clubs ====
The Shriner contains many clubs within its structure such as the Hillbillies, Gorilla, Veterans, Cigar Club etc..

=== High Twelve ===
High Twelve is a masonic appendant body primarily focused on youth support and patriotic events.

=== Tall Cedars of Lebanon ===
- Tall Cedars of Lebanon or Tall Cedar, are organized into "Forests" and meet at Masonic Temples or banquets halls. Some refer to themselves as the "poor man's Shriners", their motto is "Fun, Frolic & Fellowship", and members wear a pyramid shaped hat.

=== The Widow's Sons ===
- The Widow's Sons Motorcycle Rider Association has established chapters across the UK, US, Canada, South Africa, Central, and South America. The level of support from regional Grand Lodges varies widely, ranging from no formal recognition to full endorsement. In some regions, Grand Lodges may even confer a specialized Widow's Sons degree as part of their affiliation.

=== Grotto ===
- Mystic Order of Veiled Prophets of the Enchanted Realm. Often referred as "Grotto", the organization is an exclusive social club, open only to Master Masons. While it welcomes all Master Masons, it aims to rekindle interest in the Blue Lodges and dive in its teachings in a relaxed manner. However, it does not assert any affiliation with Symbolic Craft Masonry. Members of this group are sometime seen or criticized as being an elite group within freemasonry, they can be identified by their distinctive black fez adorned with a red tassel and a Mokanna head at the center. Their gatherings often take place in opulent venues or upscale dining establishments.

=== Order of the Eastern Star ===
- Order of the Eastern Star. Membership is limited to Master Masons and their female relatives, or majority members of Job's Daughters and The Rainbow for Girls. Each chapter is led by the Worthy Matron and assisted by the Worthy Patron. Female relatives must be related by birth, marriage, or adoption to a Master Mason.

In 2025, the requirement for a Masonic relative was removed. This allows any female over the age of 18 to petition for membership, with the sponsorship of a Master Mason, already in Order of the Eastern Star.

=== Order of the Amaranth ===
- Order of the Amaranth. An American fraternal order for Master Masons and their female relatives. Governed by a Supreme Council, with Grand Courts in most US states. Direct relation to a Master Mason is no longer a requirement for membership.

=== Youth organizations ===
A number of Masonic-affiliated youth organizations exist, mainly in North America, which are collectively referred to as Masonic youth organizations.

- Order of the Knights of Pythagoras, for boys aged 8 to 18; sponsored by the Prince Hall Freemasons.
- DeMolay International. Young men from 12 to 21 are eligible for membership. There are DeMolay chapters located in Argentina, Aruba, Australia, Bolivia, Brazil, Canada, Ecuador, France, Germany, Greece, Italy, Japan, Paraguay, Peru, the Philippines, Romania, Serbia, South Africa, the United States, and Uruguay.
- A.J.E.F., Asociacion de Jovenes Esperanza de la Fraternidad, for boys aged 14 to 21, active in México, the United States, and Latin America.
- Job's Daughters. Young ladies from 10 to 20, who are daughters of Master Masons or daughters of a majority Job's Daughter, or sponsored by a Master Mason or Majority Member, are eligible. The "Jobies" have Bethels in Australia, Brazil, Canada, the Philippines, and the United States. Mostly due to American military presence there have also been bethels in Germany and Japan.
- International Order of the Rainbow for Girls. Young ladies from 10 to 20 are eligible. The "Rainbow Girls" have Assemblies in Aruba, Australia, Bolivia, Brazil, Canada, Italy, Paraguay, the Philippines, Puerto Rico and Romania. Rainbow has had assemblies, mostly due to American military presence, in the following countries: Cuba, France, Germany, Japan, Mexico, Panama, the Republic of China, and Vietnam.
- Organization of Triangles Inc. was founded in 1925 by Rose E. Scherer. Triangle is located only in New York. This organization is for young ladies between the ages of 10 and 21.
