= Order of Mark Master Masons =

Appendant order of Freemasonry

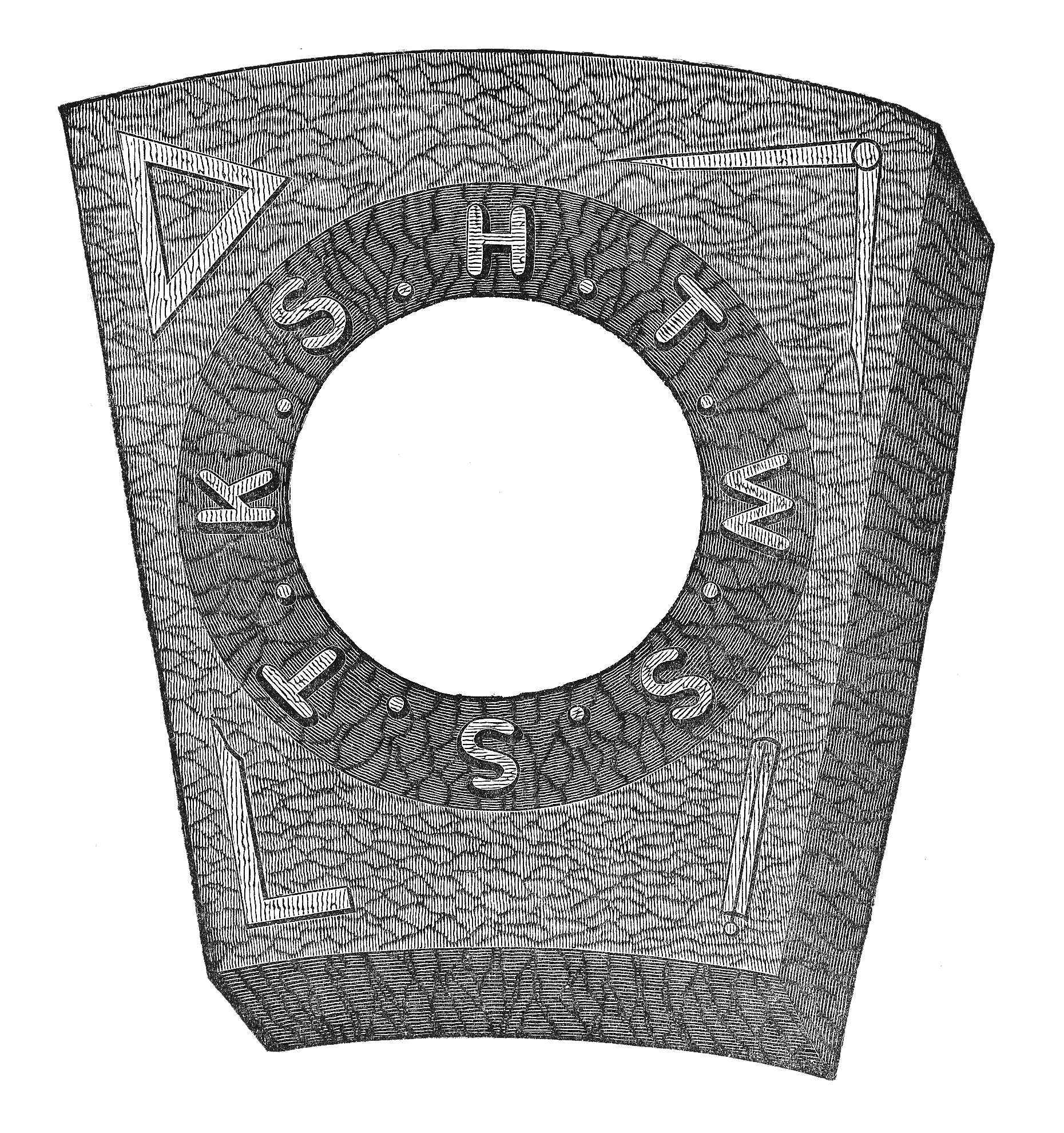
The keystone, the symbol of a Mark Master Mason.

Apron of a Mark Master Mason under the English Masonic Constitution

The Order of Mark Master Masons is an appendant order of Freemasonry that exists in some Masonic jurisdictions, and confers the degrees of Mark Mason and Mark Master.

== Purpose ==
Similarly to Craft Freemasonry, Mark Masonry conveys moral and ethical lessons using a ritualised allegory based around the building of King Solomon's Temple. The ceremonies of Mark Masonry require the candidate to undertake the role of a Fellowcraft, thus the degree is seen as an extension of the Fellowcraft Degree, and the philosophical lessons conveyed are appropriate to that stage in a candidate's Masonic development.

While the Fellowcraft degree teaches a Mason what the historical wages of a Fellowcraft Mason are, the Mark Master Mason degree teaches a Mason how to earn those wages, how to prove his work is his own, and what the penalty for fraud was during the building of the Temple. The legend reconciles the Anglo-American version of the Hiramic legend with the 3,300 Master Masons of Anderson's constitutions, making them Mark Masters, or overseers. The candidate is helped to choose a Mason's mark, and introduced to another extension of the Hiramic myth, relating to the manufacture, loss, and re-finding of the keystone of the Royal Arch.

The link between the degrees of Master Mason, Mark Master Mason and the Royal Arch is further demonstrated in the Order of Royal and Select Masters.

== History ==
The first record of Mark Masonry in England is in 1769, when Thomas Dunckerley, as Provincial Grand Superintendent, conferred the degrees of Mark Mason and Mark Master at a Royal Arch Chapter in Portsmouth.

Following the Union of the Antients and Moderns Grand Lodges and the formation of the United Grand Lodge of England in 1813, the articles of union stated that there would be three Craft degrees only, including the Royal Arch, excluding the Mark degree. For this reason, while in the rest of the world Mark Masonry became attached to Royal Arch chapters, in England it was actually proscribed from the Union until the 1850s. It was a group of Scottish masons who procured an illegal warrant from Bon Accord Chapter in Aberdeen to set up a Mark lodge in London. An attempt to add Mark Masonry to the approved craft workings was defeated in 1856, and a Grand Lodge of Mark Master Masons was created in response.

As Freemasonry spread around the globe in the 18th and 19th centuries, Mark Masonry expanded with it, with six daughter Grand Lodges and the degree being worked under alternative administrative structures elsewhere. In England, the current Mark Grand Master is Prince Michael of Kent.

== Administrative structure ==
The administration of Mark Masonry varies greatly from jurisdiction to jurisdiction, though in all jurisdictions, the candidate for advancement is nowadays required to be a Master Mason to be eligible for this degree. In Europe, Asia and Australia the Mark Degree is conferred in separately warranted Lodges under the Grand Lodge of Mark Master Masons.

== By country ==
In North and South America, parts of Europe, Asia, and Oceania, the Mark Master Mason degree is conferred as the first of the Capitular Degrees in a Royal Arch Chapter, the first appendant body in the York Rite.

=== Australia ===
In Australia, the administration of Mark Masonry varies from jurisdiction to jurisdiction:

In Western Australia, the degree of Mark Master is conferred in a Royal Arch Chapter operating under the Supreme Grand Royal Arch Chapter of Western Australia, and is conferred as part of the process of Exaltation to the Holy Royal Arch Degree. The Degree may also be conferred upon candidates in a Lodge formed under the Scottish Constitution, by warrant from the Grand Lodge of Scotland.

In Queensland, the degree of Mark Master can be conferred by a Royal Arch Chapter under the Supreme Grand Royal Arch Chapter of Queensland or by a Mark Master Mason's lodge under the Grand Lodge of Mark Master Masons in Queensland. His entry into the Chapter is preceded by a short ceremony of Mark Lodge Affiliation, if the candidate has already been advanced into the Mark degree.

In New South Wales and the Australian Capital Territory, the Mark Master Mason Degree is conferred by a Royal Arch Chapter holden under the United Supreme Grand Chapter of Mark & Royal Arch Masons. Warranted Craft Lodges holden under the United Grand Lodge of NSW & ACT confer a Mark Man ceremony which is not treated as a degree. The Mark Man ceremony is commonly believed to be the contents of what was removed from the original second degree.

=== Brazil ===
In Brazil, the governing body is The Grand Lodge of Mark Master Masons of Brazil, which also controls the Royal Ark Mariner degree; conferred in separately warranted Royal Ark Mariner Lodges.

=== Ireland ===
In Ireland, the degree of Mark Master Mason is required to join a Royal Arch Chapter. A Royal Arch Chapter meets as a Mark Lodge, confers the Mark Degree on a candidate making him eligible to become a Royal Arch Mason at a subsequent meeting. A Mark Lodge and a Royal Arch Chapter share the same Warrant within the Irish system.

=== Turkey ===
In Turkey, the governing body is Grand Lodge of Mark Master Masons of Turkey and its Districts and Lodges Overseas which also controls the Royal Ark Mariner degree. The Order is administrated from Progresif Masonluk Dernegi, Istanbul Turkey.

=== United Kingdom ===
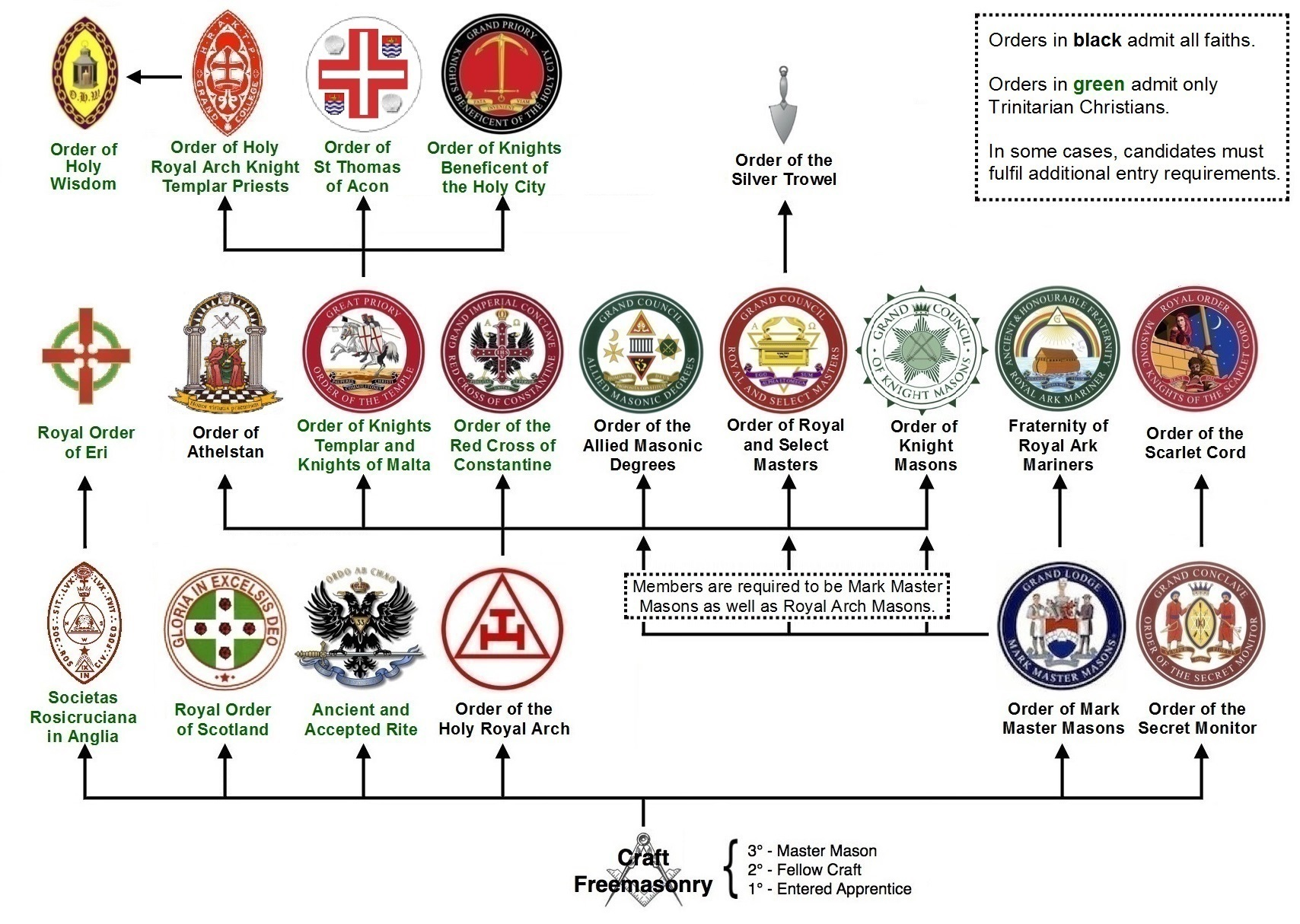
The position of the Order of Mark Master Masons among the Masonic appendant bodies in England and Wales

In England and Wales, the governing body is The Grand Lodge of Mark Master Masons of England and Wales and its Districts and Lodges Overseas, which also controls the Royal Ark Mariner degree. This is a separate degree conferred on Mark Master Masons. Each Royal Ark Mariner lodge is "moored" to a Mark lodge and shares its number. The Order is administered from Mark Masons' Hall, London.

Within the British Federation of Le Droit Humain, the Most Puissant Grand Commander of the Federation is the guardian of all side degrees, including the Mark. A member of the British Federation may apply for the Mark degree three months after being raised to the degree of Master Mason. Membership of the Mark is a prerequisite to join the Royal Ark Mariner degree and the Holy Royal Arch. This latter requirement means the Mark is also, by extension, a prerequisite to join the Knights Templar.

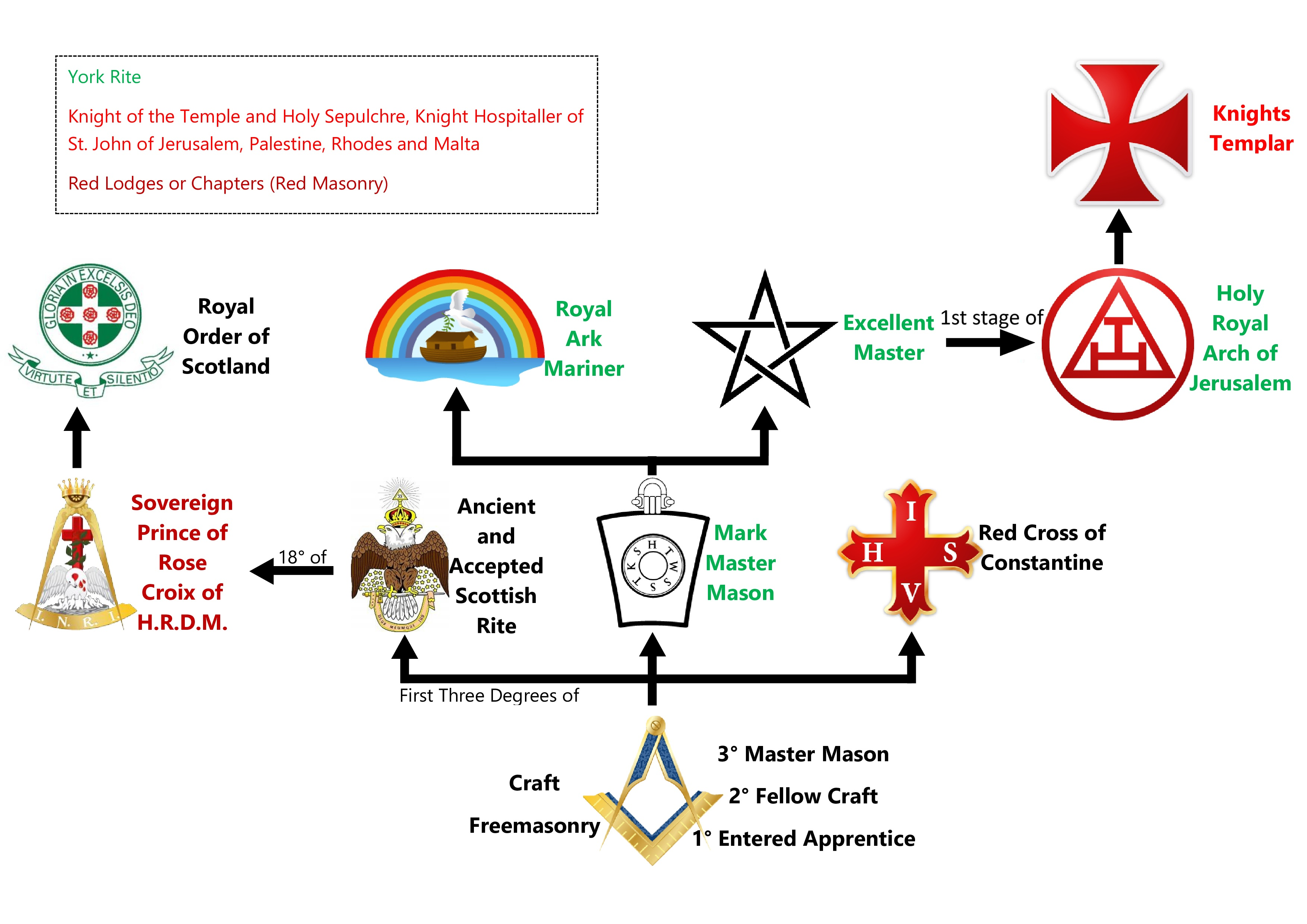
Position of the Mark among the Allied Degrees of British Le Droit Humain

The Grand Lodge of Mark Master Masons of Greece and its Lodges Overseas, was formed on 7 October 1993 by the Grand Lodge of Mark Master Masons of England and Wales and its Districts and Lodges Overseas, presiding the then Pro Grand Master MW Bro. Lord Swansea. The Degree of the Royal Ark Mariner was put under the control of the Grand Lodge of MMM and the first Lodge of RAM was constituted in October 1996.

In Freemasonry in Scotland, the Mark Degree may be conferred in a Craft lodge and is interpreted as a component part of the Fellowcraft degree. The degree may also be conferred in a Holy Royal Arch Chapter as a prerequisite for progressing to the grade of Excellent Masters and then for exaltation to the HRA. Should a candidate for a Scottish Royal Arch Chapter already have taken his Mark Degree in a Lodge then he will affiliate to that Chapter before proceeding to the Excellent Master and then Royal Arch Degrees.
