= Order of Royal and Select Masters =

UK Freemasonry appendant order

The Order of Royal and Select Masters is an appendant order of Freemasonry and frequently referred to as 'Cryptic Degrees'. In England and Wales, the degrees are practiced as a stand-alone organisation of Freemasonry while in some other Masonic Constitutions, particularly in North America, it is a part of the York Rite.

== History ==
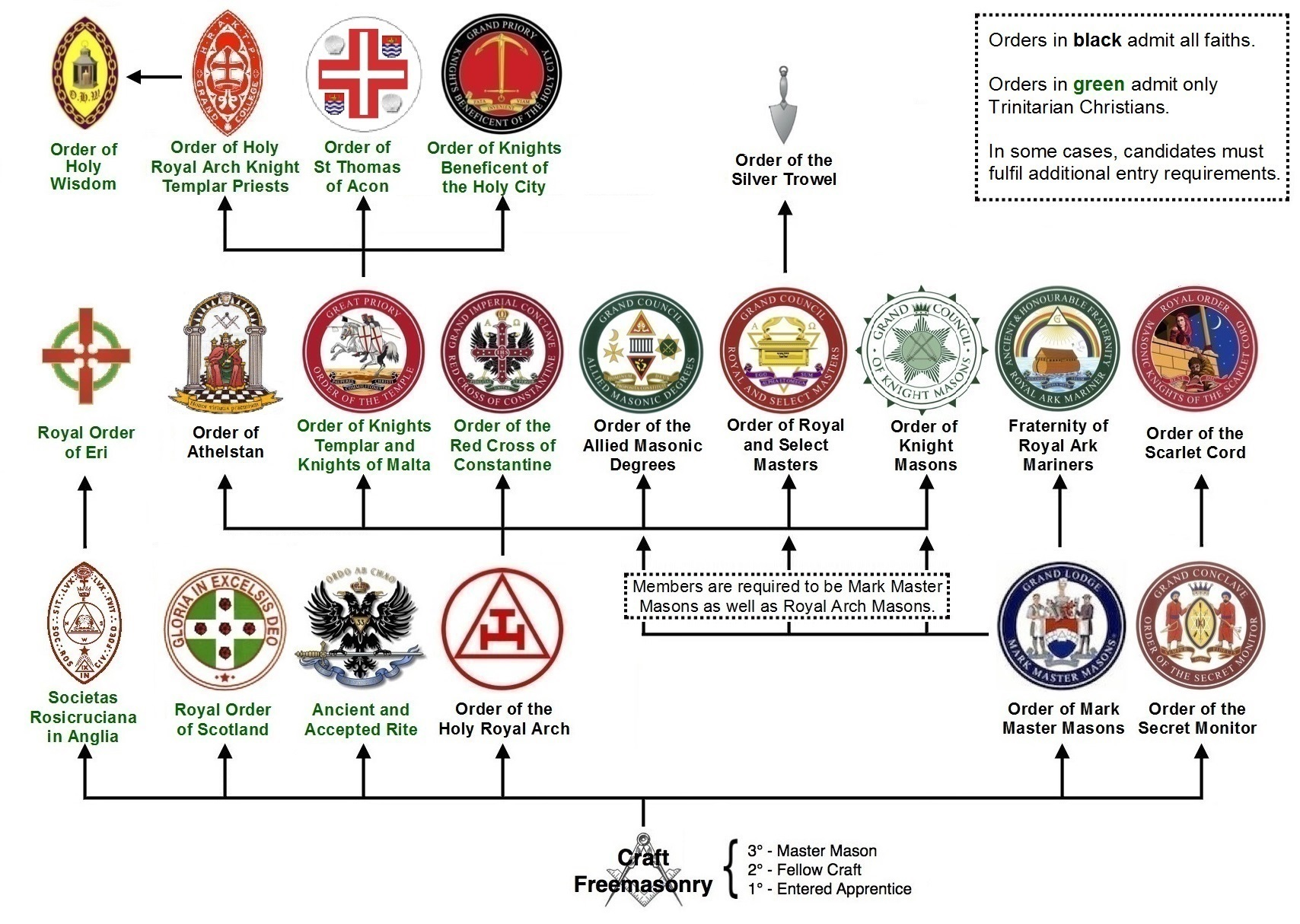
The position of the Order of Royal and Select Masters among the Masonic appendant bodies in England and Wales

The Grand Council of Royal and Select Masters of England and Wales and its Districts and Councils Overseas was formally constituted on 29 July 1873 by four English councils that had been chartered two years earlier by the York Rite Grand Council of New York (see Cryptic Masonry). These four English councils organized themselves as a sovereign body under the leadership of G.R. Portal, a Past Grand Master of the Order of Mark Master Masons, who also became first Grand Master of the Order of Royal and Select Masters. The Order is today administered from Mark Masons' Hall, London.

== Qualification for membership ==
In England and Wales, all Master Masons who are both Royal Arch and Mark Master Masons are eligible for membership of this Order. Members wear a jewel and a characteristic apron which is triangular in shape.

== Structure and organisation ==
The Order meets in local Councils, each having an elected presiding officer named the Thrice Illustrious Master, who appoints a number of assisting officers. Councils are grouped into districts, each governed by a District Grand Master, who likewise appoints district officers. The Grand Council in London governs around 240 Councils, mostly in England and Wales, but with some overseas. The Grand Council in London controls overseas districts in South Africa, the Caribbean, and the Channel Islands, and also controls a few isolated overseas councils in the Isle of Man and across several nations of western Europe and the Far East.

The Grand Council exercises control of six degrees. The first four are worked by local councils of the Order, and most members will progress through all four degrees. This series of degrees is based on the Masonic legend of King Solomon's Temple and throws light on the links between the degrees of Master Mason, Mark Master Mason, and the Holy Royal Arch. They are the degrees of:

- Select Master
- Royal Master
- Most Excellent Master
- Super-Excellent Master

The two additional degrees are granted more sparingly to those who have a history of long or distinguished service to the Order. They are worked only in certain Councils, licensed for that purpose by the Grand Master. They are the degrees of:

- Thrice Illustrious Master (commonly known as the Order of the Silver Trowel)
- Excellent Master (also known as passing the veils)

The degree of Thrice Illustrious Master (Silver Trowel) should not be confused with the title of the presiding officer of a Council, which is "Illustrious Master", but otherwise unconnected.
