= Allied Masonic Degrees =

Masonic organization bringing together allied degrees.

The Allied Masonic Degrees (AMD) are a series of Masonic degrees conferred by Councils of the Allied Masonic Degrees. The Allied Masonic Degrees form an appendant order of Freemasonry that exists in some Masonic jurisdictions; its degrees are conferred only by invitation. Councils of the Allied Masonic Degrees exist in Great Britain, the United States, Canada, France, Australia, India, Benin and Congo, and their members also educate one another by presenting research papers on Freemasonry.

== The degrees in the UK ==
=== England and Wales ===
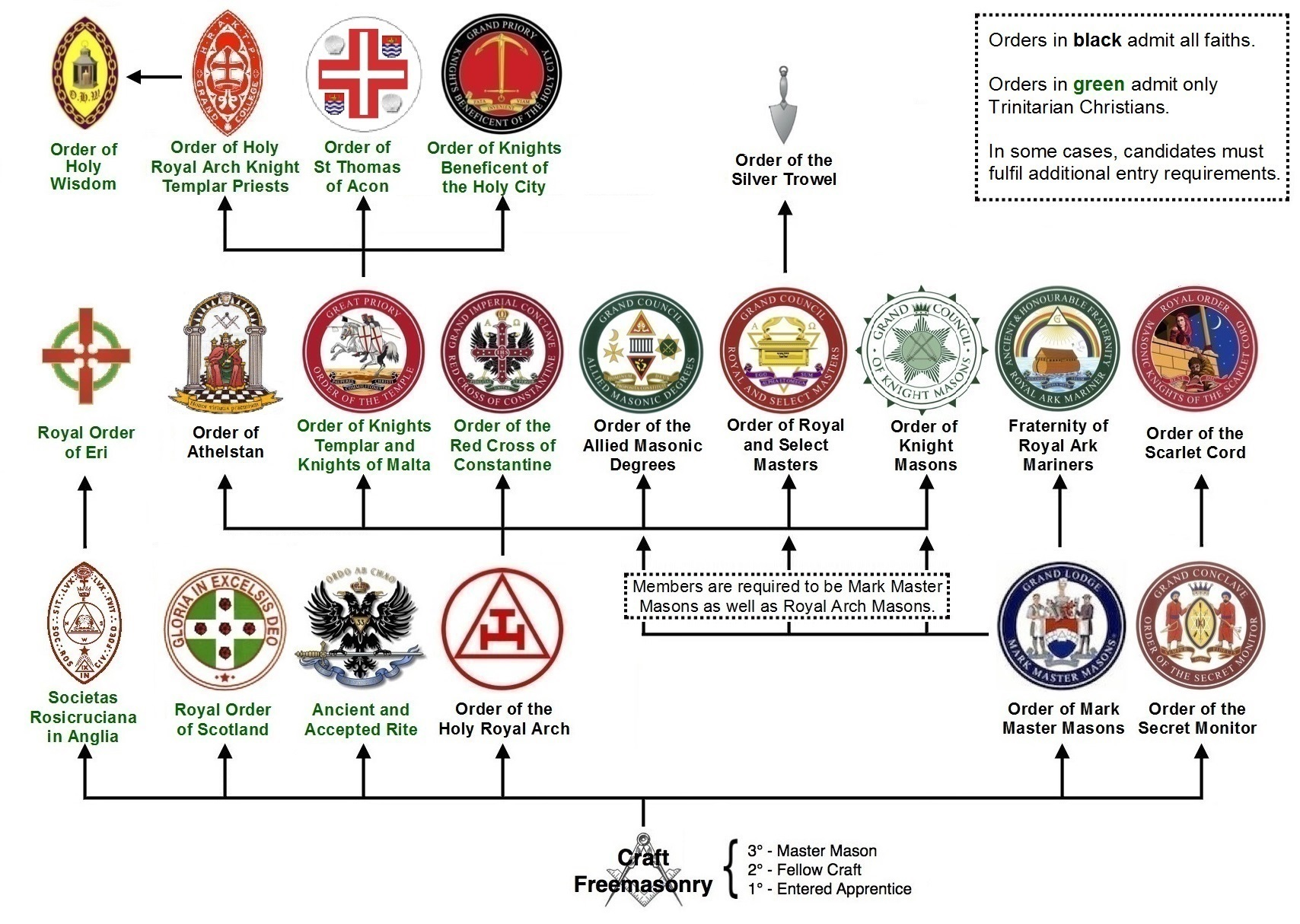
The position of the Allied Masonic Degrees among the Masonic appendant bodies in England and Wales

In England and Wales the entry degree for all members is the Order of Saint Lawrence the Martyr. This is the prerequisite for participating in Council meetings. Four other degrees follow, which can be taken in any order, according to the programme of the member's local Council, although the degree of the Grand Tilers of Solomon is often taken last by a candidate. The full set of degrees in England and Wales is:

- Saint Lawrence the Martyr
- Knight of Constantinople
- Grand Tilers of Solomon
- Grand High Priest
- Red Cross of Babylon.

The Order of the Secret Monitor, once part of the AMD, now has its own independent conclaves and national structure within England and Wales. The Order is administered from Mark Masons' Hall, London.

=== Knights of Constantinople — Plymouth Working ===
In 1865 a Council of Knights of Constantinople was formed in Devonport, Plymouth, leading to an independent branch of the Order. In 1910 the three remaining councils submitted to the Grand Council of the Allied Masonic Degrees, but on condition of retaining the right to wear their own distinctive apron, and the privilege and exclusive right to confer the degree as practised by the Plymouth Councils since 1865. Only Christian brethren are eligible to join the Plymouth Working. All three Plymouth Councils continue to work, and are today numbers 33, 34, and 35 on the roll of the Grand Council.

=== Scotland ===
In Scotland, there is no direct equivalent of the Allied Masonic Degrees, nor are the degrees for which it is responsible carried out under the auspices of any of the Scottish masonic bodies, although the 'Red Cross of Babylon' is a truncated version of the Scottish 'Babylonish Pass' degree under the control of the Supreme Grand Royal Arch Chapter of Scotland. There is no reciprocal agreement on intervisitation in the 'Lodge & Council' degrees between the Supreme Grand Royal Arch Chapter of Scotland and the Council of the Allied Masonic Degrees. Nonetheless, The Grand Council of the Allied Masonic Degrees of England and Wales and Districts and Councils Overseas has been recognised since 2004 as a 'Masonic Body in Amity with The Grand Lodge of Scotland'

== The degrees in the US ==
In the United States of America, a national Grand Council charters local councils, which confer their degrees on selected Royal Arch Masons. Most councils are limited to twenty-seven members, but the Council of the Nine Muses is limited to nine authors (the new Sovereign Master must read a new essay), and the Grand Master's Council has no limit, either numerically or geographically.

The officers of a Council utilize many of the same titles as the officers of a Masonic lodge, with the presiding officer being denominated 'Sovereign Master." The Councils are given wide discretion as to choose how frequently they meet and what programs to pursue. Generally speaking, Councils study or discuss Freemasonry in some way at each meeting. The Grand Council has created some internal honors, the most notable being "Knight Grand Cross".

The degrees conferred in the United States are:

- Royal Ark Mariner
- Order of the Secret Monitor
  - Brotherhood of David and Jonathan: Induction
  - Brotherhood of David and Jonathan: Admission of a Prince
  - Installed Supreme Ruler (OSM chair degree)
- Knight of Constantinople
- Order of Saint Lawrence the Martyr
  - Installed Worthy Master (OSLM chair degree)
- Architect
- Grand Architect
- Superintendent
- Grand Tiler of Solomon
- Master of Tyre
- Excellent Master
- Installed Sovereign Master (AMD chair degree)
- Installed Commander Noah (RAM chair degree)
- Ancient Order of Corks (recreational; special rules apply)
- The Order of the Scarlet Cord (special rules apply)
- Royal Order of the Red Branch of Eri and Appendant Orders (honorary) (Royal Order of Eri in England)
  - Man at Arms (optionally provided as an honor)
  - Esquire (optionally provided as an honor)
  - Knight (optionally provided as an honor)
  - Knight Commander (available to a member who has completed a term as Sovereign Master of his Council)
  - Knight Grand Cross (a Brother who has served as a Grand Officer in the Grand Council)
  - Supreme Grand Cross (a Brother who has been installed as Sovereign Grand Master)

=== Organisation ===
The structure is very much like that of the craft lodges, with the exception that the offices of Secretary and Treasurer may be combined in some councils.

Craft Masonry	AMD Council
Worshipful Master	Sovereign Master
Senior Warden	Senior Warden
Junior Warden	Junior Warden
Treasurer	Treasurer
Secretary	Secretary
Senior Deacon	Senior Deacon
Junior Deacon	Junior Deacon
	Senior steward
	Junior steward
Chaplain	Chaplain
Tyler	Sentinel

== The degrees in Canada ==
In Canada, the degrees conferred are:

- St. Lawrence the Martyr
- Installed Master of St. Lawrence

Optional degrees are:

- Knight of Constantinople
- Grand Tilers of Solomon
- Excellent Master
- Masters of Tyre
- Architect (implied prerequisite degree for Grand Architect)
- Grand Architect (implied prerequisite degree for Superintendent)
- Superintendent

Royal Order of the Red Branch of Eri (known as the Royal Order of Eri in England, and is given at the Annual Assembly, or by the District Deputy Grand Master)

- Optional Degrees (included with basic membership but can be conferred):
  - Man at Arms
  - Esquire
- Required Degree:
  - Knight (on request; requisite for election as Sovereign Master)
- Ranks:
  - Knight Commander (a Knight who has served a term as Sovereign Master of his lodge)
  - Knight Grand Cross (a Knight Commander who has been elected to the Grand Council)
  - Supreme Grand Cross (a Knight Commander who has been installed as Sovereign Grand Master)

"Fun" degrees: (given at the Annual Assembly)

- Ye Ancient Order of Corks
- Order of the Bath
