= Red Cross of Constantine =

Christian fraternal order of Freemasonry

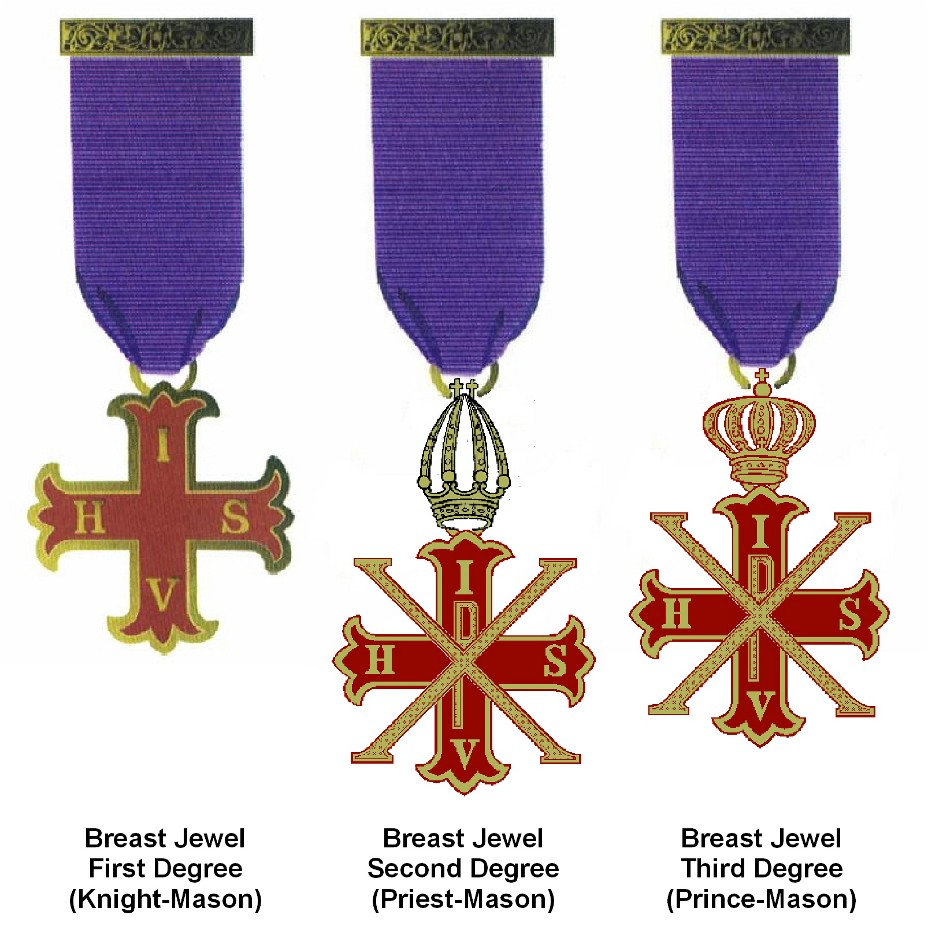
The breast jewels (medals) worn by members of the English jurisdiction of the Order.

The Red Cross of Constantine, or more formally the Masonic and Military Order of the Red Cross of Constantine and the Appendant Orders of the Holy Sepulchre and of St John the Evangelist, is a Christian fraternal order of Freemasonry. Candidates for the order must already be members of Craft Freemasonry (lodge) and Royal Arch Freemasonry (chapter); they must also be members of the Christian religion, and proclaim their belief in the Christian doctrine of the Holy Trinity.

The Masonic and Military Order of the Red Cross of Constantine is a three-degree Order of masonry, and with its "Appendant Orders" a total of five degrees are conferred within this system. Installation as a “Knight of the Red Cross of Constantine” is admission to the Order's first degree. There are two more degrees which follow, and also the two other distinct Orders of Masonry (both Christian in character) which are under the control of each national (or regional) Grand Imperial Conclave of the Order.

== The Order of the Red Cross of Constantine ==
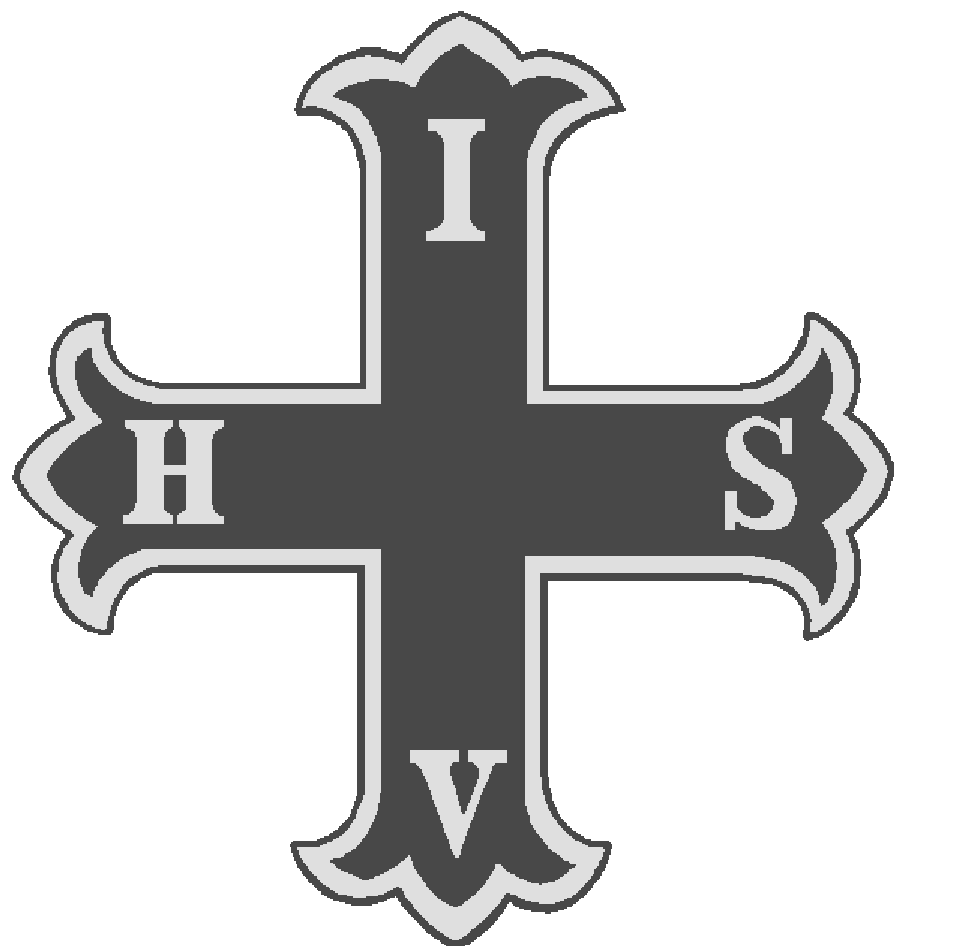
The Cross fleury with IHSV, symbol of the Order of the Red Cross of Constantine.

=== First Degree – Knight-Mason ===
On admission to the Order a member becomes a Knight-Mason, or a Knight of the Red Cross of Constantine. This ceremony is known as installation, and is performed in a ‘Conclave’. A Conclave is the regular unit of this Order, and the name for any assembly of members of the Order's first degree. The ceremony is short and simple, but teaches valuable moral lessons to the candidate, based upon the story of the Roman Emperor Constantine the Great, and the Battle of the Milvian Bridge.

=== Second Degree – Priest-Mason (or Installed Eusebius) ===
On election to serve as Viceroy (the second in command of a Conclave), a member must be admitted to the second degree, by which ceremony he becomes a Venerable Priest-Mason, or an Installed Eusebius. This ceremony is performed in a ‘College’ of Priests-Mason. A college is the name for any assembly of members of the Order's second degree. The ceremony is highly spiritual in nature, and incorporates more overtly religious symbolism and ritual. Having received this degree the Installed Eusebius or Priest-Mason is entitled to serve as Viceroy in his own, or any other, Conclave or College. In general this degree may only be conferred on those elected to serve as Viceroy of a Conclave, although exceptions are possible by dispensation.

=== Third Degree – Prince-Mason ===
On election to serve as Sovereign (the leader of a Conclave), a member must be admitted to the third degree, by which ceremony he becomes a Perfect Prince-Mason. The ceremony is performed in a ‘Senate’ of Princes-Mason. A Senate is the name for any assembly of members of the Order's third degree. Having received this degree the Prince-Mason is entitled to serve as Sovereign in his own, or any other, Conclave or Senate. Except by dispensation, this degree is only ever conferred on those elected as Sovereign. As with all masonic degrees, it may only be conferred on a person once - therefore a person becoming Sovereign for a second time, or in a different Conclave, would be appointed and installed into office, and would not go for a second time through the full degree ceremony.

== The Appendant Orders ==
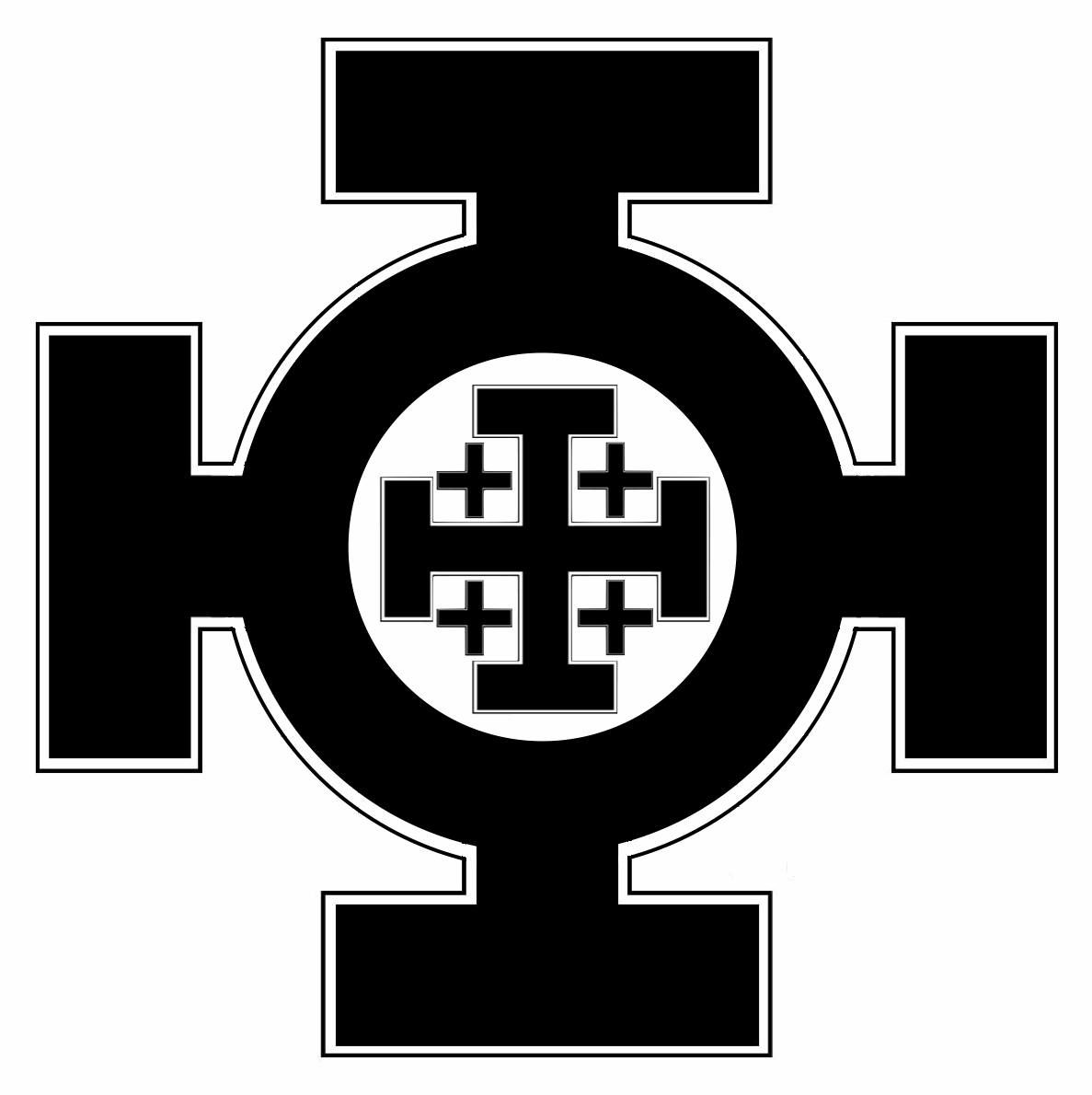
The Jerusalem cross within a circle and cross, symbol of the Order of the Holy Sepulchre.

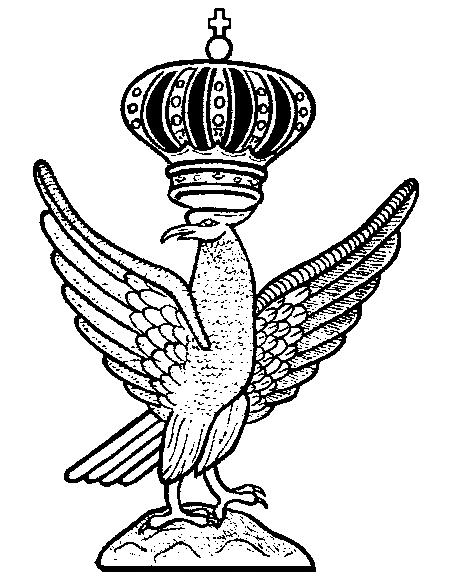
The crowned eagle, symbol of the Order of Saint John the Evangelist.

Two additional Christian Orders of Masonry are under the control of the Grand Imperial Conclaves (national ruling bodies) of the Red Cross of Constantine. One is the Order of the Holy Sepulchre and the other is the Order of St John the Evangelist. Each of these Orders consists of a single degree or ceremony, and although the two Orders are conferred separately, they are usually conferred on the same day, one straight after the other. It is a rule of most jurisdictions that a member of the first degree of the Red Cross of Constantine must subsequently take these two Appendant Orders, before he may be considered qualified to proceed to the second and third degrees of the Red Cross of Constantine.

=== The Order of the Holy Sepulchre ===
The Masonic Order should not be confused with the identically named Order of the Holy Sepulchre within the Roman Catholic Church. Although both Orders recall the same historical events, there is no actual connection between them. The Masonic Order of the Holy Sepulchre has a long and complex ritual of symbolic meaning, based upon the legend of knights guarding the supposed place of burial of Jesus Christ. Both the Masonic and ecclesiastical Orders take the Jerusalem Cross as their symbol, but whereas the ecclesiastical Order displays this cross in red on a white shield, the Masonic Order displays the cross within a circle set at the centre of a Cross potent; on the jewel (medal) of the Order, this badge is further enclosed within a black and gold lozenge. A meeting of the Order of the Holy Sepulchre takes place in a ‘Sanctuary’, and the presiding officer is called the 'Prelate'.

=== The Order of St John the Evangelist ===
This Order is conferred in a short ceremony of an overtly Christian character; it is common for the Order of St John the Evangelist to be conferred on the same day as the Order of the Holy Sepulchre, one ceremony occurring straight after the other. A meeting of the Order of St John the Evangelist takes place in a ‘Commandery’, and the presiding officer is called the 'Commander'. The jewel of the Order of St John the Evangelist features a silver eagle with its wings extended, to which a crown is added in reference to the role of Commander, or any member of the Order who is a current or past Commander. The eagle is a traditional symbol of St John the Evangelist.

== History ==
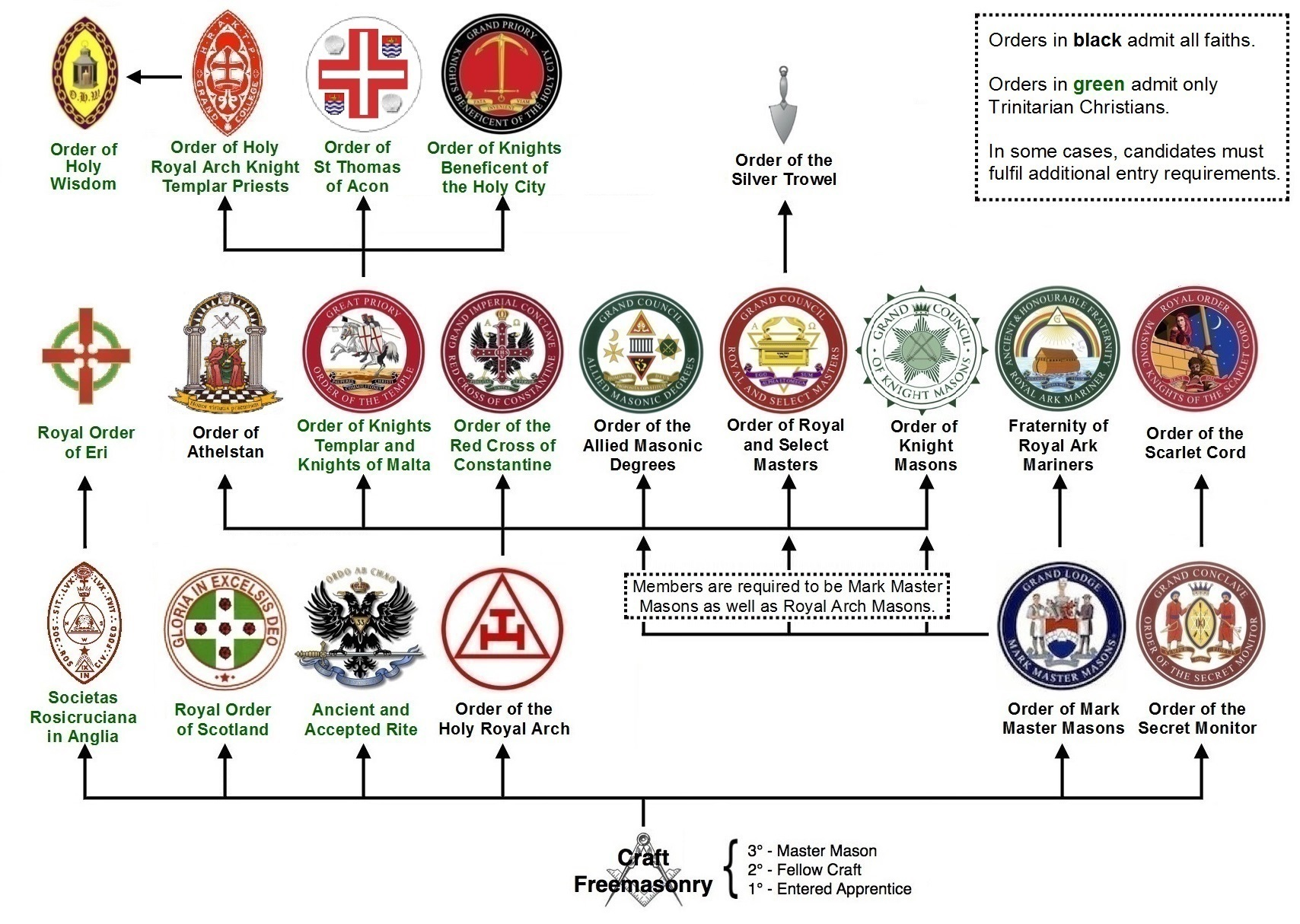
The position of the Red Cross of Constantine among the Masonic appendant bodies in England and Wales

Since at least the 18th century, Freemasonry has incorporated symbols and rituals of several Medieval military orders in a number of Masonic bodies, most notably, in the "Red Cross of Constantine" (derived from the Military Constantinian Order), the "Order of Malta" (derived from the Sovereign Military Order of Malta), and the "Order of the Temple" (derived from the historical Knights Templar), the latter two featuring prominently in the York Rite.

Tracing the precise origins of these Orders has proved problematic to historians, not least due to the large number of fraternal organisations whose titles include, or have historically included, the phrase "Red Cross". It seems likely that the Order of the Red Cross of Constantine was being worked in England by 1780, but following several re-organisations the earliest documented date of the Order in its present form is 1865, when its constitution was formally established by Robert Wentworth Little (who also founded the Societas Rosicruciana in Anglia). In time it became one of the ten 'companion' Masonic Orders (or families of Orders) controlled from a common headquarters at Mark Masons' Hall, London. Following the establishment of Conclaves in overseas nations, a number of sovereign foreign Grand Imperial Conclaves or Grand Imperial Councils (ruling bodies) have been established.

== International extent ==
The Order of the Red Cross of Constantine operates around the world in almost 50 different nations. All regular jurisdictions trace their historical origin to the Grand Imperial Conclave for England and Wales. The following table shows the countries in which the Order is active, and the national or state jurisdiction responsible for the Order in that country.

Country	Jurisdiction (Grand Imperial Conclave - "GIC")	Notes
Andorra	GIC for Andorra	Established 2021 (previously under the GIC for France).
Australia	GIC for NSW and ACT; GIC for Queensland; GIC for South Australia; GIC for Victoria; GIC for Western Australia	Uniquely, Australia has separate State jurisdictions, for each mainland State, but not for Tasmania (see below). No national GIC exists.
Australia (Tasmania)	GIC of Scotland	Tasmania Division
Bahamas	GIC for England & Wales & its Divisions & Conclaves overseas; GIC of Scotland	Jamaica Division (English conclaves); Caribbean Division (Scottish conclaves)
Barbados	GIC for England & Wales & its Divisions & Conclaves overseas; GIC of Scotland	English Conclaves administered from London. Caribbean Division (Scottish conclaves)
Belgium	GIC for England & Wales & its Divisions & Conclaves overseas	Benelux Division
Benin	GIC for Benin	Established on 24 May 2017 out of the former Benin Division of the GIC for France.
Brazil	GIC for England & Wales & its Divisions & Conclaves overseas	Conclaves administered from London.
Bulgaria	GIC for England & Wales & its Divisions & Conclaves overseas	Conclaves administered from London.
Canada	GIC of Canada	There are also two Conclaves in British Columbia under the GIC of Scotland.
Congo	GIC for Congo	Established 2020 (previously under the GIC for France).
Croatia	GIC for Croatia	
Cyprus	GIC for Cyprus	There is also one Conclave (Akritas Conclave No 14, Nicosia) controlled by the GIC for Greece.
Denmark	The RCC is recognised as being controlled by the Swedish Rite Grand Lodge of Denmark	
El Salvador	United GIC of the US, Mexico, & the Philippines	Division of Mexico, Guatemala, & El Salvador
England	GIC for England & Wales & its Divisions & Conclaves overseas	
Finland	GIC for Finland	
France	GIC for France	
Germany	GIC of Germany; GIC of Scotland	The German GIC has jurisdiction across the country. Additionally, there are (by mutual consent) three Conclaves still operating as a Division under the GIC of Scotland (one each in Sigillum, Berlin, and Bremen).
Greece	GIC for Greece & its Conclaves abroad	
Guatemala	United GIC of the US, Mexico, & the Philippines	Division of Mexico, Guatemala, & El Salvador
Guinea (region)	GIC for the Gulf of Guinea	Controls Conclaves throughout the region, from Togo to Gabon. Not currently recognised as regular by the GIC for England.
Guyana	GIC for England & Wales & its Divisions & Conclaves overseas; GIC of Scotland	English Conclaves administered from London. Caribbean Division (Scottish conclaves)
Hong Kong	GIC for England & Wales & its Divisions & Conclaves overseas	Conclaves administered from London.
India	GIC for England & Wales & its Divisions & Conclaves overseas	Conclaves administered from London.
Italy	GIC for Italy	
Jamaica	GIC for England & Wales & its Divisions & Conclaves overseas	Jamaica Division
Kenya	GIC for England & Wales & its Divisions & Conclaves overseas	Conclaves administered from London.
Luxembourg	GIC for England & Wales & its Divisions & Conclaves overseas	Benelux Division
Madagascar	GIC for France	Madagascar Division
Malaysia	GIC for England & Wales & its Divisions & Conclaves overseas	Conclaves administered from London.
Malta	GIC for England & Wales & its Divisions & Conclaves overseas	Conclaves administered from London.
Mauritius	GIC for Mauritius	Established in October 2019 out of the former Mauritius Division of the GIC for France.
Mexico	United GIC of the US, Mexico, & the Philippines	Division of Mexico, Guatemala, & El Salvador
Netherlands	GIC for England & Wales & its Divisions & Conclaves overseas	Benelux Division
New Zealand	GIC for New Zealand	
Norway	The RCC is recognised as being controlled by the Swedish Rite Grand Lodge of Norway	
Panama	United GIC of the US, Mexico, & the Philippines	Division of Panama
Papua New Guinea	GIC for England & Wales & its Divisions & Conclaves overseas	Conclaves administered from London.
Philippines	United GIC of the US, Mexico, & the Philippines	
Puerto Rico	United GIC of the US, Mexico, & the Philippines	Division of Puerto Rico
Romania	GIC for England & Wales & its Divisions & Conclaves overseas	
Scotland	GIC of Scotland	
Singapore	GIC for England & Wales & its Divisions & Conclaves overseas	Conclaves administered from London.
Slovenia	GIC for Slovenia	
South Africa	GIC for England & Wales & its Divisions & Conclaves overseas	South Africa Division; There is also a single Conclave in Johannesburg under the GIC of Scotland.
Sweden	The RCC is recognised as being controlled by the Swedish Rite Grand Lodge of Sweden	
Switzerland	GIC for Switzerland	Established 2010, but not recognised as regular by any other GIC.
Trinidad and Tobago	GIC of Scotland	Caribbean Division
United States (except Maine)	United GIC of the US, Mexico, & the Philippines	All US territory except the State of Maine.
United States; Maine	GIC for the State of Maine	Maine remains independent, unlike other States.
Wales	GIC for England & Wales & its Divisions & Conclaves overseas	

=== North America ===
The Order had arrived in Canada by 1869 (McLeod Moore Conclave No 13, St John's, New Brunswick), with nine more Conclaves warranted in 1870 (one in Montreal, and the others in the Ontarian cities of Hamilton, London, Peterborough, Toronto, Kingston, Orillia, Trenton, and Belleville) by the English Grand Imperial Conclave, which had appointed Colonel W. J. B. MacLeod Moore as the Chief Inspector General of the Order for the Dominion of Canada. Although the Canadian members were highly instrumental in introducing the Order into the United States, where it sought independence within just months, the Order in Canada remained under English control for twenty years, until the Grand Imperial Council of Canada was established in 1890.

The United Grand Imperial Council of the United States of America and Its Jurisdictions has jurisdiction throughout the United States, except the State of Maine, as well as Mexico, the Philippines, and some parts of Central America. According to its own centenary history, the first American Conclave was United States Premier Conclave No 38 at Washington, Pennsylvania (now Conclave No 1 in America). However, the records of the English Grand Conclave show warrant No 38 applying to St James' Conclave at Maitland, in Canada. Both sources agree that it was consecrated on 14 December 1870. The English records show the first Conclaves consecrated in the United States to have been Cleveland Conclave No 39 at Cleveland, Ohio, and Cincinnati Conclave No 40 at Cincinnati, Ohio, both consecrated in 1871.

In 1871 and 1872 a large number of Conclaves were consecrated in Pennsylvania, Illinois, and New York, and during 1872 sovereign Grand Imperial Councils were founded in all three States, starting with Pennsylvania on 14 June 1872. In the following three years, Grand Imperial Conclaves were established in the states of Massachusetts, Michigan, Kentucky, Indiana, Vermont, Maine and New Jersey. In 1907 most of the individual jurisdictions were united into the GIC of the United States of America, and in 1946 the name was changed to reflect the operation of Conclaves in Mexico and the Philippines.

In 1894, the Grand Imperial Council of Pennsylvania had withdrawn from the Union and established a rival jurisdiction. The two rival authorities, having long co-existed, entered into dialogue in the 1950s, and were reconciled and reunited on 18 February 1958, into the single jurisdiction for almost the whole of the United States.

The Red Cross Masons of Maine have chosen to maintain their independence, with their own Grand Imperial Council. The State of Vermont also had its own independent Grand Imperial Council until 1997; in that year Vermont voted to close its independent body, and to be incorporated into the United GIC.

The American jurisdiction also established a small number of Conclaves in Italy, including the Eboracum Conclave in Sicily. However, these Conclaves are no longer listed in the directory of Conclaves of the American jurisdiction.

Within the York Rite system the Red Cross of Constantine is considered by many to be the highest honour that can be awarded. It is considered to be equivalent to the 33° (honorary) in the Scottish Rite.

=== Former jurisdictions ===
There is a small number of places where the Order has commenced work, but subsequently withdrawn, the earliest being the British Crown dependencies of Jersey and Guernsey. Doyle Conclave No 7 in Court Place, Guernsey, and Concord Conclave No 8 in St Helier, Jersey, were consecrated in 1868 at a time when the Order had just 6 Conclaves (4 in London and 2 in Edinburgh), but they were short-lived, and both had been removed from the role of Conclaves by 1923. A similar story applies to the British overseas territory of Gibraltar, where Mediterranean Conclave No 11 was consecrated in 1870, but did not survive.

In addition, a number of Conclaves were founded in territories of the British Empire or later British dependencies, but failed to survive the changing demographics of independence. Examples of these include Aden Conclave at Aden in modern-day Yemen, Indus Valley Conclave at Mooltan in modern-day Pakistan, St Louis & St Cyprian Conclave in Tunis, Tunisia, Excelsior Conclave at Moulmein in Burma, Lanka Conclave in Sri Lanka, and Rhodesia Conclave in Mufulira in northern Zambia.

In 1942 the Grand Imperial Council of Scotland chartered a new Conclave to meet in Belfast, Northern Ireland. However, following complaints from the Irish masonic authorities the conclave was never consecrated. There remains no Red Cross masonry in Ireland.

== See also ==
- Knights Templar (Freemasonry)
- Freemasonry

=== Original chivalric orders ===
- Sacred Military Constantinian Order of Saint George
- Order of the Holy Sepulchre
