= Podiatric medical school =

Education institutions for podiatrists

Podiatrist, Podiatric Surgeon, Podiatric Physician, Foot and Ankle Surgeon
Occupation
- Activity sectors: Medicine, orthopedics, endocrinology

Description
- Education required: Doctor of Podiatric Medicine
- Fields of employment: Hospitals, private practices

Podiatric Medical School is the term used to designate the institutions which educate students and train them to be podiatrists, which diagnose and treat conditions affecting the foot, ankle, and related structures of the leg. In the United States, only schools which are accredited by the Council on Podiatric Medical Education (CPME) may earn the status of being a Podiatric Medical School. The Doctor of Podiatric Medicine degree is commonly abbreviated D.P.M. degree. The D.P.M. degree is a prerequisite for an individual to be accepted into a CPME accredited residency. The preparatory education of podiatric physicians — very similar to the paths of traditional physicians (MD or DO) — includes four years of undergraduate work, followed by four years in an accredited podiatric medical school, followed by a three- or four-year hospital-based podiatry residency. Optional one- to two-year fellowship in foot and ankle reconstruction, surgical limb salvage, sports medicine, plastic surgery, pediatric foot and ankle surgery, and wound care is also available.

There are eleven podiatric medical schools accredited by the CPME in the United States. Podiatric physicians are licensed in all 50 U.S states, the District of Columbia and Puerto Rico to treat the foot and its related or governing structures by medical, surgical or other means.

State licensing requirements generally include graduation from one of the eleven accredited schools and colleges of podiatric medicine, passage of the National Board exams, postgraduate training and written and oral examinations. National Boards are taken in two parts while in podiatric medical school. Part I covers basic science areas and is generally taken at the conclusion of the second year. Part II has a written exam and Clinical Skills Patient Encounter (CSPE) components of the examination. The CSPE portion assesses proficiency in podiatric clinical tasks and the written examination covers clinical areas such as Medicine; Radiology; Orthopedics, Biomechanics and Sports Medicine; Anesthesia and Surgery; and Community Health, Jurisprudence, and Research.

== United States ==
Podiatric medical education in the United States consists of four (4) years of graduate education with the first two focusing primarily upon the sciences and the last two focusing upon didactic, clinical, and hospital externship experience; similar to education undertaken at other medical schools but with more exposure to the foot and ankle and its related pathologies.[1] After successful completion of these four (4) years of professional education, students are granted a Doctor of Podiatric Medicine (D.P.M.) degree.

While the American Podiatric Medical Association defines Doctor of Podiatric Medicine, or podiatrist, as “a physician and surgeon of the foot and ankle,” the Social Security Administration’s Program Operations Manual System (POMS) legally defines a podiatrist as the following: A podiatrist is included within the definition of “physician” but only with respect to those functions which the podiatrist is legally authorized to perform in the State in which the individual performs them. Furthermore, the POMS states: A podiatrist is considered a “physician” for any of the following purposes: 1. for making the required physician certification and recertifications of the medical necessity for Part A and Part B provider services. 2. for the purpose of establishing and periodically reviewing a home health plan of treatment; and for purposes of constituting a member of a Utilization Review (UR) committee but only if: a.the performance of these functions is consistent with the policy of the institution or agency with respect to which the podiatrist performs them; b. the podiatrist is legally authorized by the State to perform such functions; and c. at least two of the physicians on the UR committee are doctors of medicine or osteopathic medicine.

=== Post-graduate training ===
In order to enhance the progression from student to competent podiatric physicians, graduates are required to complete a three-year or four-year post-graduate training residency before practicing podiatric medicine. Each individual residency program must be approved by the Council on Podiatric Medical Education of the American Podiatric Medical Association. The American Association of Colleges of Podiatric Medicine provides a complete list of approved Podiatric Residency Programs.

=== Accreditation and governing bodies ===
The American Association of Colleges of Podiatric Medicine governs many aspects of Podiatric Medical Education, including a mentor network, a centralized application service for prospective students, the Central Application Service for Podiatric Residencies, and the Centralized Residency Interview Program. Schools are also accredited by governmental agencies. Schools of podiatric medicine are not recognized as medical schools by the World Directory of Medical Schools or the World Federation for Medical Education, both of whom recognizes COCA-accredited DO-granting and LCME-accredited MD-granting medical schools. Unlike DO and MD, the DPM is yet to be recognized as a full medical degree by the said institutions or by the physician community. It is also important to note that both DO and MD degree holders train in ACGME-accredited residencies; whereas, DPM graduates qualify to participate in residencies accredited by the Council on Podiatric Medical Education(CPME).

The Council on Podiatric Medical Education is an autonomous accrediting agency for podiatric medical education. Deriving its authority from the House of Delegates of the American Podiatric Medical Association, the Council is empowered to develop and adopt standards and policies as necessary for the implementation of all aspects of its accreditation, approval, and recognition purview. The Council is recognized by the Council for Higher Education Accreditation (CHEA) and the US Secretary of Education as the accrediting agency for first professional degree programs in podiatric medicine.

The American Podiatric Medical Students' Association represents students of podiatry.

=== Schools in United States ===
There are eleven podiatric medical schools accredited by the CPME in the United States:

Podiatric Medical School in the United States
Name	University	Location	Founded	Website
Arizona School of Podiatric Medicine	Midwestern University	Glendale, Arizona	2004	
Barry University School of Podiatric Medicine	Barry University	Miami Shores, Florida	1985	
College of Podiatric Medicine	Samuel Merritt University (Note: Formerly California College of Podiatric Medicine, merged into Samuel Merritt University in 2002)	Oakland, California	1914	
Des Moines College of Podiatric Medicine and Surgery	Des Moines University	Des Moines, Iowa	1980	
Kent State University College of Podiatric Medicine	Kent State University (Note: Formerly Ohio College of Podiatric Medicine, merged into Kent State University in 2012)	Independence, Ohio	1916	
New York College of Podiatric Medicine	Touro University System	New York City	1911	
Scholl College of Podiatric Medicine	Rosalind Franklin University (Note: Formerly Illinois College of Podiatric Medicine, merged into Rosalind Franklin University in 2001)	North Chicago, Illinois	1912	
Temple University School of Podiatric Medicine	Temple University (Note: Formerly Pennsylvania College of Podiatric Medicine, merged into Temple University in 1998)	Philadelphia, Pennsylvania	1963	
UTRGV School of Podiatric Medicine	University of Texas Rio Grande Valley	Harlingen, Texas	2022	
Western College of Podiatric Medicine	Western University of Health Sciences	Pomona, California	2009	
LECOM School of Podiatric Medicine	Lake Erie College of Osteopathic Medicine	Erie, Pennsylvania	2022	

== Canada ==
In Canada, the definition and scope of the practice of podiatry varies provincially. For instance, in some provinces like British Columbia and Alberta, the standards are the same as in the United States where the Doctor of Podiatric Medicine (DPM) is the accepted qualification.

Quebec, too, has recently changed to the DPM level of training, although other academic designations may also register. Also in Quebec, in 2004, Université du Québec à Trois-Rivières started the first program of Podiatric Medicine in Canada based on the American definition of podiatry. In the prairie and Atlantic provinces, the standard was originally based on the British model now called podiatry (chiropody). That model of podiatry is currently the accepted model for most of the world including the United Kingdom, Australia and South Africa.

The province of Ontario has been registering Chiropodists since July 1993 (when the Ontario Government imposed a cap on new podiatrists). If a registered podiatrist from outside of Ontario relocates to Ontario they are required to register with the province and practice as a chiropodist. Podiatrists who were practising in Ontario previous to the imposed provincial cap were 'grandfathered' and allowed to keep the title of podiatrist as a subclass of chiropody. The scope of these 'grandfathered' (mostly American trained) podiatrists includes bony procedures of the forefoot and the ordering of x-rays in addition to the scope of the chiropodist.

In Ontario, podiatrists are required to have a "Doctor of Podiatric Medicine/DPM" degree (a post-baccalaureate, four-year degree), where the majority of chiropodists currently practising hold a post-secondary diploma in chiropody, although many also have some university level schooling or a baccalaureate degree in the sciences or in another field. Podiatrists may bill OHIP for their services; chiropodists may not. Podiatrists may "communicate a diagnosis" to their patients (or to their patients' representatives) and perform surgical procedures on the bones of the forefoot; chiropodists may do neither.

Chiropodists and podiatrists are regulated by the College of Chiropodists of Ontario, which had 594 chiropodists and 65 podiatrists registered as of 29 July 2015.

The only English-speaking Chiropody program in Canada, in which also has a working Chiropody Clinic on campus for students to treat patients under the supervision of licensed Chiropodists is The Michener Institute. According to The Michener Institute website, Chiropody is a branch of medical science that involves the assessment and management of foot and lower limb disorders. This includes the management of a wide variety of disorders, injuries, foot deformities, infections and local manifestations of systemic conditions. A Chiropodist is a primary care professional practising in podiatric medicine in Ontario that specializes in assessment, management and prevention of diseases and disorders of the foot. An essential member of the inter professional healthcare team, the Chiropodist is skilled in assessing the needs of their patients and of managing both chronic and acute conditions affecting foot and lower limb function. As a primary care provider capable of independent clinical practice, these skills are often practised independent of medical referral and medical supervision.
