= Kelly Powers =

American podiatric surgeon and television commentator (1979–2024)

- Born: May 13, 1979; Yonkers, New York, U.S.
- Died: December 1, 2024 (aged 45); Colts Neck Township, New Jersey, U.S.
- Education: Baruch College; New York College of Podiatric Medicine; University of San Francisco
- Known for: Television commentary, brain cancer research awareness
- Spouse: Steven Doll
- Children: 1
- Scientific career
- Fields: Podiatric surgery, diabetes, limb salvage, sports medicine
- Workplaces: White Plains Hospital; Stamford Hospital; Rye Ambulatory Surgery Center

Kelly Ann Powers (May 13, 1979 – December 1, 2024) was an American podiatric surgeon and television commentator. She worked as a medical expert and health advocate, appearing on networks such as Fox News and Fox Business, while also supporting various medical charities and raising awareness about brain cancer following her diagnosis in 2020.

== Early life and education ==
Kelly Ann Powers was born on May 13, 1979, in Yonkers, New York, to Joan Marie Powers and Joseph Powers. She grew up in Westchester County.

Powers obtained a bachelor's degree from Baruch College and later attended the New York College of Podiatric Medicine. She pursued a M.S. in environmental science at the University of San Francisco, focusing on toxicology and epidemiology, and conducted thesis work on skeletal fluorosis in Eastern Africa. She completed her medical residency at Georgetown University School of Medicine and Boston University School of Medicine, specializing in podiatric and general surgery.

== Career ==
Powers worked as a podiatric surgeon with a focus on diabetes, limb salvage, and sports medicine. She was affiliated with several medical institutions, including White Plains Hospital in New York, Stamford Hospital in Connecticut, and the Rye Ambulatory Surgery Center. Powers published articles in medical journals such as Plastic and Reconstructive Surgery and Journal of Diabetes Research.

Powers regularly appeared on Fox News and Fox Business, including programs like Fox & Friends and Red Eye. Her role involved discussing medical news, public health, and political topics. She also contributed to CNN, HLN, and NBC News on health-related stories. During the COVID-19 pandemic, she shared health tips and discussed vaccine developments on Fox Business.

Powers volunteered with organizations like Remote Area Medical and supporting causes like MedGift and the Plaster House. She presented her research on skeletal fluorosis at the American Public Health Association meeting and planned to perform surgeries for children with the condition in Tanzania.

== Personal life and death ==
Powers married Steven Doll, a sales trader, and they had a son via surrogacy in 2021 due to her health conditions. In her leisure time, she enjoyed activities such as biking, gardening, and ballet.

In 2020, Powers was diagnosed with glioblastoma, an aggressive brain cancer. She underwent multiple surgeries and treatments. Powers used her platform to raise awareness about brain cancer research and supported cancer-related charities. She died at her home in Colts Neck Township, New Jersey, on December 1, 2024, at the age of 45.

== Filmography ==
Year	Title	Role	Notes
2016–2017	Red Eye	Self	7 episodes
2019	Talking Live with Dr. Robi Ludwig	Self	1 episode

== Publications ==
- Powers, Kelly (November 2010). Exposure to High Levels of Fluoride in the Ground Water of the Ethiopian Rift Valley Results in Lower Extremity Skeletal Fluorosis & Neuropathy. American Public Health Association. Denver, Colorado.
- Powers, Kelly (January 2011). Events Following Primary Closure Of A Contaminated Wound. American College of Foot and Ankle Surgeons. Providence, Rhode Island.
- Powers, Kelly (January 2012). Diabetic Foot Ulcer Complicated By Still's Disease: Immunosuppression & the Diabetic Foot. American College of Foot and Ankle Surgeons. Providence, Rhode Island.
- Powers, Kelly (October 2012). Early Experience With Negative Pressure Wound Therapy With Instillation in Acutely Infected Wounds: Preliminary Data. Diabetic Limb Salvage.
- Powers, Kelly (February 2013). Outcomes of the Partial Calcanectomy Based on the Amount of Calcaneus Removed. American College of Foot and Ankle Surgeons. Las Vegas, Nevada.
- Powers, Kelly (February 2013). Frequency of Intra-Operative Changes as a Result of the Surgical “Time Out.”. American College of Foot and Ankle Surgeons. Las Vegas, Nevada.
- Powers, Kelly (February 2013). Fellowship Specialties Podcast. American College of Foot and Ankle Surgeons. Las Vegas, Nevada.
- Powers, Kelly (February 2013). ACFAS Recognized Fellowship Initiative - Fellowship Panel. American College of Foot and Ankle Surgeons. Las Vegas, Nevada.
- Powers, Kelly Ann (May 2013). Why It Pays To Pursue A Fellowship. Podiatry Today. Accessed December 13, 2024. Archived on Archive.today on December 13, 2024.
- Powers, Kelly (May 7, 2013). Independent Study Showed Decrease In Operating Room Visits For Patients With Infected Wounds Using Adjunctive V.A.C. VeraFlo (TM) Therapy - Press Release. (permanent dead link). The Wall Street Journal. Accessed December 13, 2024.
- Powers, Kelly (May 2013). Frequency of Intra-Operative Changes as a Result of the Surgical “Time Out.”. International Anesthesia Research Society.
- Powers, Kelly (May 2013). Experience With Negative Pressure Wound Therapy With Instillation In Acutely Infected Wounds. (permanent dead link). Symposium on Advanced Wound Care. Accessed December 13, 2024.
- Powers, Kelly (May 7, 2013). Independent Study Showed Decrease In Operating Room Visits For Patients With Infected Wounds Using Adjunctive V.A.C. VeraFlo (TM) Therapy. (permanent dead link). Kinetic Concepts. San Antonio, Texas.
- Powers, Kelly (December 2013). Environmental & Medical Management of Skeletal Fluorosis in Eastern Africa. University of San Francisco, California. Master's Thesis.

=== Contributions to publications ===
- The impact of negative-pressure wound therapy with instillation compared with standard negative-pressure wound therapy: a retrospective, historical, cohort, controlled study. March 2014. Plastic and Reconstructive Surgery. doi:10.1097/01.prs.0000438060.46290.7a. PMID 24572860. 133(3):709-716.
- Lower Extremity Function following Partial Calcanectomy in High-Risk Limb Salvage Patients. January 27, 2015. Journal of Diabetes Research.
- Level of resilience in nurses working at COVID-19 referral centers in Iran. Nursing Forum. December 15, 2021. 57(3).
- Family support person role during resuscitation: A qualitative exploration. Journal of Clinical Nursing. February 15, 2022. 32(3-4).
- Nurses' experiences of provision family-centred care in the postresuscitation period: A qualitative study. Nursing Open. August 22, 2023. 10(11).
