= Journal of the American Podiatric Medical Association =

- Discipline: Podiatry
- Language: English
- Edited by: Warren R. Joseph

Publication details
- History: 1907–present
- Publisher: American Podiatric Medical Association (United States)
- Frequency: Bimonthly
- Impact factor: 0.574

Standard abbreviations
- ISO 4: J. Am. Podiatr. Med. Assoc.

Indexing
- ISSN: 8750-7315 (print); 1930-8264 (web)
- OCLC no.: 11700519

Links
- Journal homepage; Online access; Online archive

The Journal of the American Podiatric Medical Association is a bimonthly peer-reviewed academic journal covering podiatry, including foot and ankle surgery, biomechanics, and dermatology. It was established in 1907 and is the official journal of the American Podiatric Medical Association. The editor-in-chief is Warren R. Joseph.

== Abstracting and indexing ==
The journal is abstracted and indexed in:

- Index medicus/MEDLINE/PubMed
- Current Contents/Life Sciences
- Science Citation Index Expanded

According to the Journal Citation Reports, the journal has a 2013 impact factor of 0.574.
