= Alpha Gamma Kappa =

American podiatric medicine fraternity

- ΑΓΚ
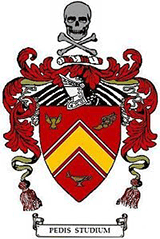
- Founded: January 21, 1939; 87 years ago Dr. William M. Scholl College of Podiatric Medicine
- Type: Professional
- Affiliation: Independent
- Status: Active
- Emphasis: Podiatry
- Scope: National
- Motto: Pedis Studium "Zeal for the Foot"
- Colors: Cardinal and Gold
- Symbol: Skull and Crossbones
- Flower: White Rose
- Patron Greek deity: Asclepius
- Patron Roman deity: Mercury
- Publication: The Mercurius
- Chapters: 6 Active
- Headquarters: 370 Hawthorne Avenue; Oakland, California 94609; United States
- Website: www.samuelmerritt.edu/agk

Alpha Gamma Kappa (ΑΓΚ or AGK) is the oldest and largest professional fraternal organization for students and practitioners of podiatric medicine in the United States. The fraternity was founded in 1939 at the Dr. William M. Scholl College of Podiatric Medicine in Chicago, Illinois.

== Mission statement ==
The mission of Alpha Gamma Kappa Podiatric Fraternity is "to promote and perpetuate the profession of podiatric medicine through social, educational, community service, and leadership events, which foster the growth and development of podiatric medical students and physicians."

== History ==
On January 21, 1939, eight men at Illinois College of Chiropody and Orthopedics (now Dr. William M. Scholl College of Podiatric Medicine) in Chicago, Illinois, founded a fraternity for "social spirit and fraternalism." It was the first podiatry collegiate fraternity. Samuel Abdoo was elected the fraternity's first president.

It became a national fraternity in 1948 with the chartering of Beta chapter at the Ohio College of Podiatric Medicine in Cleveland, Ohio. The two chapters would occasionally correspond with one another, but for the most part remained separate entities with their traditions, except for the "Ritual of Initiation," which is still in use, written by the Alpha chapter in 1939. In the fall of 1961, the Gamma chapter was chartered at the California School of Podiatric Medicine in San Francisco, California.

In 2007, a transfer student from Scholl College to the Barry University School of Podiatric Medicine in Miami, Florida sought to create a fraternity there. The Delta chapter was established on October 2, 2007. This was followed by the Epsilon chapter at the Temple University School of Podiatric Medicine in 2008 and the Zeta chapter at Des Moines University College of Podiatric Medicine and Surgery in 2009.

== Symbols and traditions ==
The fraternity's colors are cardinal and gold, and its jewel is the white pearl. The white rose is the official flower of the fraternity. Its color represents purity and truth, while its beauty and fragrance symbolize the affection and friendship of the brothers. Annually, chapters hold a spring White Rose Ball.

Its badge is diamond-shaped, trimmed in gold with the Greek letters ΑΓΚ appearing in gold and surmounting a skull and crossbones in gold on a background of black onyx. On the back of the badge is the motto Pedis Studium or "Zeal for the Foot." The pledge pin is a triangle of cardinal with the winged foot of Mercury in the center.

Asclepius, the Greek demigod of medicine and healing, holds a special place in Alpha Gamma Kappa tradition and symbolism. The pledge manual of the fraternity is named The Asklepian. Each year on or near November 7, chapters hold a celebration known as Asclepius Day with a festive party or event. The Roman god Mercury is the Patron of Alpha Gamma Kappa. His winged sandal is a prominent symbol, displayed on the fraternity's coat-of-arms and the pledge pin.

The fraternity flag is rectangular and divided into three equal sections. The first and third sections are cardinal, with the middle section being white. In the middle section is the coat of arms of the fraternity. The flag is used only during ritualistic ceremonies and on special occasions.

== Governance ==
Since 1939, the fraternity has functioned as a confederation with chapters being loosely affiliated with one another. There have been no national officers or conventions. Individual chapters are subordinate to the respective podiatric medical student association at their college or school.

== Activities ==
In the 1960s, the Beta chapter started and maintained a free clinic completely run by students to provide podiatric medical care to the less fortunate in Cleveland. In 2013, the Alpha chapter saw a resurgence in social and fundraising activities, raising thousands of dollars to provide care for uninsured patients through Rosalind Franklin University's new Interprofessional Community Clinic.

The fraternity's highest and most prestigious award is the "Pedis Studium Award" which is presented by chapters to podiatric physicians who are members of the fraternity and have, in their practice of podiatric medicine, exemplified the principles of Alpha Gamma Kappa through service, education, and leadership.

== Chapters ==
Chapters	Charter date	Institution	Location	Status	Ref.
Alpha	1939	Dr. William M. Scholl College of Podiatric Medicine at Rosalind Franklin University	North Chicago, Illinois	Active	(Note: The Scholl College of Podiatric Medicine merged with the Rosalind Franklin University in 2001.)
Beta	1948	Kent State University College of Podiatric Medicine	Independence, Ohio	Active	(Note: Chapter was formed at the Ohio College of Podiatric Medicine that merged to become Kent State University College of Podiatric Medicine.)
Gamma	1961	California School of Podiatric Medicine at Samuel Merritt College	Oakland, California	Active	
Delta	October 2, 2007	Barry University School of Podiatric Medicine	Miami Shores, Florida	Active	
Epsilon	2008	Temple University School of Podiatric Medicine	Philadelphia, Pennsylvania	Active	
Zeta	2009	Des Moines University College of Podiatric Medicine and Surgery	West Des Moines, Iowa	Active	

== See also ==
- Professional fraternities and sororities
