= Foot and ankle surgery =

Surgical specialty

Foot and Ankle Surgeon
Occupation
- Names: Doctor, Surgeon
- Activity sectors: Surgery

Description
- Education required: M.D., D.O. or D.P.M.
- Fields of employment: Hospitals, Clinics, Surgery Centers

Foot and ankle surgery is a sub-specialty of orthopedics and podiatry that deals with the treatment, diagnosis and prevention of disorders of the foot and ankle. Orthopaedic surgeons are medically qualified, having been through four years of college, followed by 4 years of medical school or osteopathic medical school to obtain an M.D. or D.O. followed by specialist training as a resident in orthopaedics, and only then do they sub-specialise in foot and ankle surgery. Training for a podiatric foot and ankle surgeon consists of four years of college, four years of podiatric medical school (D.P.M.), 3–4 years of a surgical residency and an optional 1 year fellowship.

The distinction between a podiatric and orthopedic foot and ankle surgeon is: an orthopedic surgeon has a Doctor of Medicine or Doctor of Osteopathic Medicine medical degree or osteopathic medical degree and training that encompasses both orthopedic residency and an optional 6-month to one year of fellowship training specific in techniques of foot and ankle surgery, while the training of a Doctor of Podiatric Medicine consist of a podiatric medical degree and three to four-year residency training specific to foot and ankle medicine and surgery, with an optional additional 1-year fellowship in foot and ankle trauma, reconstruction, or diabetic limb salvage.

In the UK much controversy exists on the scope of podiatrists practicing surgery and the British Orthopaedic Association, and the British Orthopaedic Foot and Ankle Society produced a position statement on the importance of training and ongoing regulation of podiatrists practising podiatric forefoot surgery after certification and recommended that this should be to the same standard as that of medically qualified trauma and orthopaedic surgeons operating on the foot and ankle.

== Clinical scope ==
Foot and ankle surgeons are trained to treat all disorders of the foot and ankle, both surgical and non-surgical. Additionally, the surgeons are also trained to understand the complex connections between disorders and deformities of the foot, ankle, knee, hip, and the spine. Therefore, the surgeon will typically see cases that vary from trauma (such as malleolar fractures, tibial pilon fractures, calcaneus fractures, navicular and midfoot injuries and metatarsal and phalangeal fractures.) Arthritis care (primarily surgical) of the ankle joint and the joints of the hindfoot (tarsals), midfoot (metatarsals) and forefoot (phalanges) also plays a rather significant role. Congenital and acquired deformities include adult acquired flatfoot, non-neuromuscular foot deformity, diabetic foot disorders, hallux valgus and several common pediatric foot and ankle conditions (such as clubfoot, flat feet, tarsal coalitions, etc.) Patients may also be referred to a foot and ankle surgeon for proper diagnosis and treatment of heel pain (such as a consequence from plantar heel fasciitis), nerve disorders (such as tarsal tunnel syndrome) and tumors of the foot and ankle. Amputation and ankle arthroscopy (the use of a laparoscope in foot and ankle surgical procedures) have emerged as prominent tools in foot and ankle care. In addition, more applications for laser surgery are being found in the treatment of foot and ankle disorders, including treatment for bunions and soft tissue lesions. A patient may also be referred to a foot and ankle surgeon for the surgical care of nail problems and phalangeal deformities (such as bunions and bunionettes.)

== Non-surgical treatments ==
The vast majority of foot and ankle conditions do not require surgical intervention. For example, several phalangeal conditions may be traced to the type of foot box used in a shoe, and a change of a shoe or shoe box may be sufficient to treat the condition. For inflammatory processes such as rheumatoid arthritis, non-steroidal anti-inflammatory drugs (NSAIDs) and disease-modifying antirheumatic drugs (DMARDS) may be used to manage or slow down the process. Orthotics, or an externally applied device used to modify the structural or functional characteristics of the neuromusculoskeletal system specifically for the foot and ankle, may be used as inserts into shoes to displace regions of the foot for more balanced, comfortable or therapeutic placements of the foot. Physical therapy may also be used to alleviate symptoms, strengthening muscles such as the gastrocnemius muscle (which in turn will pull on the heel, which will then pull on the plantar fascia, thus changing the structure and shape of the foot).

== Surgical treatments ==
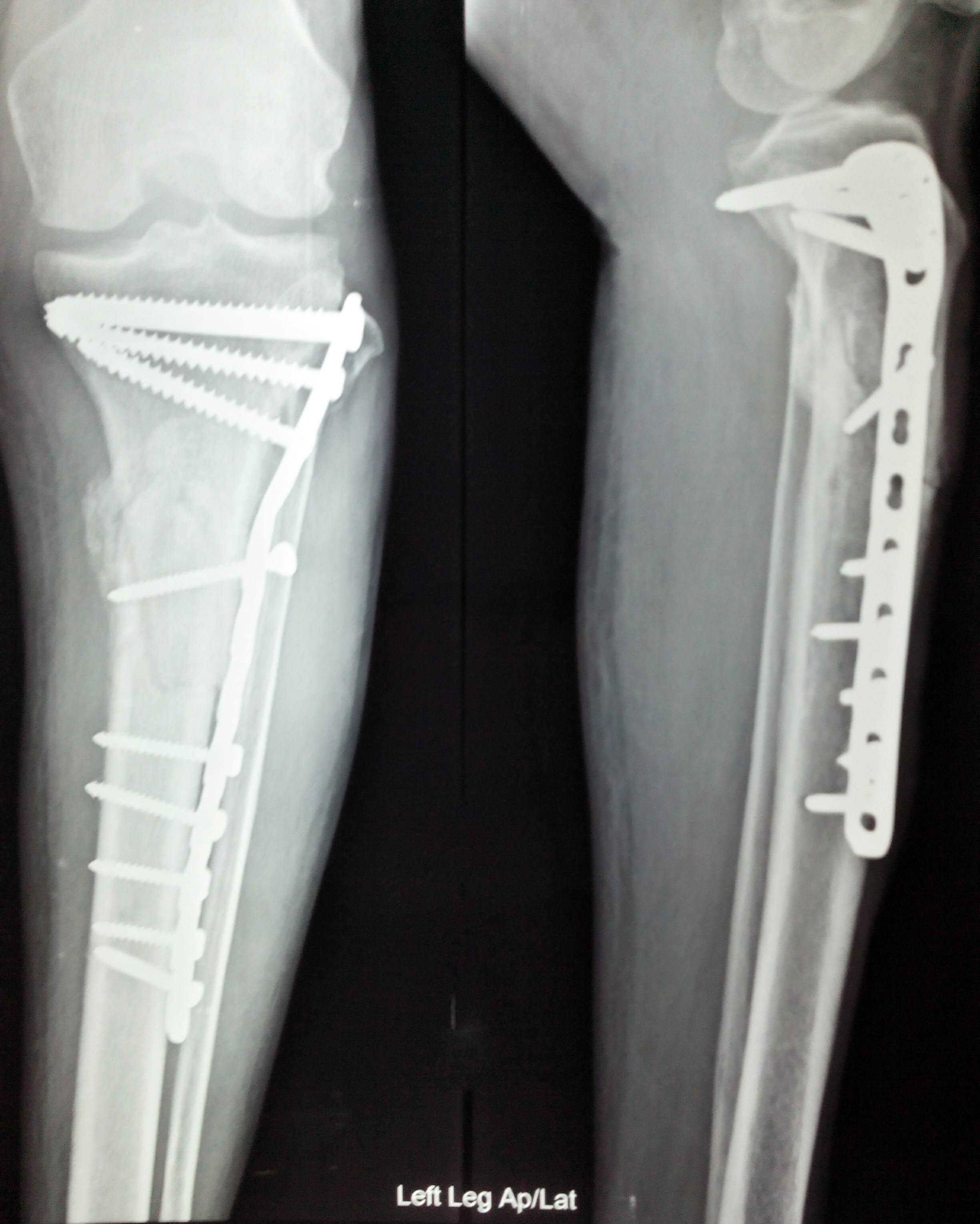
Anterior and lateral view x-rays of fractured left leg with internal fixation after surgery

Surgery is considered to be a last option when more conservative approaches fail to alleviate symptoms. Techniques such as bunionectomies may be used to surgically remove bunions and other foot and ankle deformalities, arthrodesis (or fusion of joint spaces) for inflammatory processes, and surgical reconstruction (i.e. invasive measures of manipulating neuromusculoskeletal structures) to treat other deformalities. Orthotics, physical therapy, NSAIDs, DMARDs and a change of shoe may act as a complement to surgical intervention, and in most cases will be required for optimal recovery.

== Publications ==
The last 50 years has shown high quality research into the etiology and management of foot and ankle deformities. Several publications have been made to act as forums for such research:

- Journal of the American Podiatric Medical Association - a peer reviewed indexed medical journal
- The Journal of Foot & Ankle Surgery - a surgical journal operated by the American College of Foot and Ankle Surgeons
- Foot and Ankle International - a surgical journal operated by the American Orthopaedic Foot and Ankle Society (AOFAS).
- Techniques in Foot & Ankle Surgery
- The Foot & Ankle Journal - the first open access journal for podiatry and foot & ankle orthopaedics.

== See also ==
- American College of Foot and Ankle Surgeons
- Podiatry
- American Podiatric Medical Association
