= Forensic podiatry =

Subdiscipline of forensic science

Forensic podiatry is a subdiscipline of forensic science in which specialized podiatric knowledge including foot and lower-limb anatomy, musculoskeletal function, deformities and diseases of the foot, ankle, lower extremities, and at times, the entire human body is used in the examination of foot-related evidence in the context of a criminal investigation. Forensic Podiatry has been defined as:

The application of sound and researched podiatry knowledge and experience in forensic investigations, to show the association of an individual with a scene of crime, or to answer any other legal question concerned with the foot or footwear that requires knowledge of the functioning foot.

Those who specialize in this field need to have gained knowledge and experience in podiatry and also in forensic science and practice.

Forensic podiatry is usually used to assist in the process of human identification, but can also be employed to help address issues relating to questions that have arisen within the context of forensic enquiry. Such questions could include whether or not a shoe could have had multiple wearers, what the effects of a shoe not fitting correctly could have been, whether or not someone could have placed their foot into a shoe that was too small for the postulated wearer's foot and other matters involving the podiatric interpretation of relevant evidential materials.

Each persons foot is unique to themselves. An Individual's foot shape depends on both environmental and genetic conditions. Environmental conditions like wearing certain types of footwear can influence a person's foot shape greatly. Factors like surgeries or walking habits (ex. often walking barefoot) can also give someone a unique foot structure. Genetics like the structure of the bones and how they are attached through a variety of ligaments are also unique to a person. Sizes of the ball or heel of the foot, as well as the shape of the toes can be very important determining features for forensic podiatrists.

== Areas of practice ==
There are currently four areas of forensic podiatry practice. These usually involve the analysis and interpretation in a forensic context of:

- Bare footprints (both static and dynamic prints; analyzes individual characteristics mostly focused on the toe and heel areas, such as flat footedness, ridges, humps, creases, cuts, cracks, pits, corns, or any deformities like extra or missing toes)
- Footwear (specifically the consideration of features of wear and fit)
- Podiatrists' clinical records
- Gait analysis (usually covering the examination of the gait forms of persons captured on closed circuitry television [CCTV], but also covering the analysis of the sequences of footprints at a crime scene; can help determine stride or step distance as well as other habitual movements of a person)

== Methods ==
Forensic podiatry techniques usually follow the ACE-V approach used widely in forensic science and practice. Here, ACE is the acronym for the analysis, comparison and evaluation of an item of evidence with exemplar or reference material (such as a shoe, bare footprint or recording of a suspect's gait). Verification is about the independent working through of that same material by a peer forensic specialist to confirm whether or not they reach the same conclusions as the reporting specialist.

Physical evidence is generally understood to exist at two levels which have been described as demonstrating class and identification level characteristics. Class level characteristics demonstrate consistency and compatibility, not uniqueness, which identification level characteristics are those which are understood to be unique (REF). Forensic podiatrists currently work with class level features alone although some of those features can demonstrate high levels of individuality.

Given that forensic podiatrists currently deal with class level characteristics alone, their work would not in itself usually result in the incontrovertible identification of someone unless the situation is one in which a closed population (that is one in which there is a limited number of possible people to consider when considering the possibility of a match or mismatch between two evidential items from a podiatric perspective).

The evidential materials that would be considered by forensic podiatrists can sometimes fall within the specialist understanding of other disciplines. For example, forensic gait analysis case work has been undertaken by human movement scientists and the knowledge involved in forensic gait analysis is that possessed by some physical therapists and orthopedic specialists as well as podiatrists.

Similarly, some evidential material of interest to forensic podiatrists is also of interest to other forensic specialists (particularly forensic marks examiners) although from their own particular perspectives and forensic podiatrists always need to consider the potential for multidisciplinary considerations/collaborations.

== Key historic developments ==
In 1937, Sir Sydney Smith, examining a pair of shoes left behind at the scene of a burglary in Falkirk, made deductions about the suspect. In spite of the suspect's agility as a cat burglar, he suggested that the suspect was short, had a left leg shorter than the right, a left foot an inch shorter and half an inch narrower than the right, had limited mobility in his left leg and was missing the fourth toe on that foot. He also suggested that the criminal would have a severe lateral spinal curvature. After a man was arrested in flagrante delicto at the scene of another cat burglary, and convicted, he allowed Smith to examine him in prison.

Smith discovered that he was five foot three, had had infantile paralysis in his left leg, that the leg was withered as a result, that his deductions about the size of the foot and leg were correct, but that the spinal curvature was less than he suspected.

In 1972, Norman Gunn, a podiatric physician from Canada, was the first podiatrist worldwide to undertake forensic podiatry case work.

In 1989, Wesley Vernon, a podiatrist from the UK, began to undertake research in forensic podiatry and later began to undertake case work from the mid 1990s.

In the early 1990s, John DiMaggio, a podiatric physician began to undertake forensic podiatry case work in the US.

In July 2000 forensic gait analysis was presented as evidence in a criminal trial for the first time. - Central Criminal Court, United Kingdom.

In September 2003, an organization was formed – the American Society of Forensic Podiatry.

In 2007, the Council for the Registration of Forensic Practitioners (CRFP) developed a competency test for forensic podiatrists in the UK. The CRFP is no longer in existence, but this testing process was developed further by the Chartered Society of Forensic Sciences in the UK and is available for those practising in this field.

In July 2007, a forensic podiatry science and practice subcommittee was established within the structure of the International Association for Identification (IAI).

In 2009, the IAI published a document defining the role and scope of practise for forensic podiatrists.

In 2011 an M-level course in forensic podiatry was developed at the University of Huddersfield in the UK. This was later developed further into a full MSc course in forensic podiatry at that university.

In 2011, the first forensic podiatry textbook was written. In 2017, a much more comprehensive, updated 2nd edition of this book was published.

In 2013 a forensic podiatry group was started at the New York College of Podiatric Medicine.

In 2013, a student forensic podiatry group was started at Temple University School of Podiatric Medicine.

In 2014, the forensic podiatry approach to bare footprint analysis was found to meet the US the United States Supreme Court's standard of admissibility through a Daubert hearing.

== Contemporary developments ==
In 2016, a forensic podiatry club was started at the Barry University School of Podiatric Medicine.

A formal class covering aspects of forensic podiatry is being held at New York College of Podiatric Medicine (open to podiatrist candidate)s. Students exit the class with an in depth knowledge of forensic podiatry and other legal knowledge applicable to current cases.

In 2017, at the behest of the UK regulator for forensic science, standards of practice for forensic gait analysis are being written and at the time of writing a draft document has been put out for consultation. It is anticipated that these will be completed in early 2018.
