= ACFAS =

ACFAS may refer to:

- American College of Foot and Ankle Surgeons, Professional medical society
- Association canadienne-française pour l'avancement des sciences, original name of a French-Canadian learned society
