= New York College of Podiatric Medicine =

Private medical school in New York City

Coordinates: 40.8049°N 73.9404°W

- Type: Private podiatric medical school
- Established: 1911
- Parent institution: Touro University System
- Dean: Michael J. Trepal
- Location: New York, New York, United States
- Campus: Urban
- Website: https://nycpm.touro.edu/

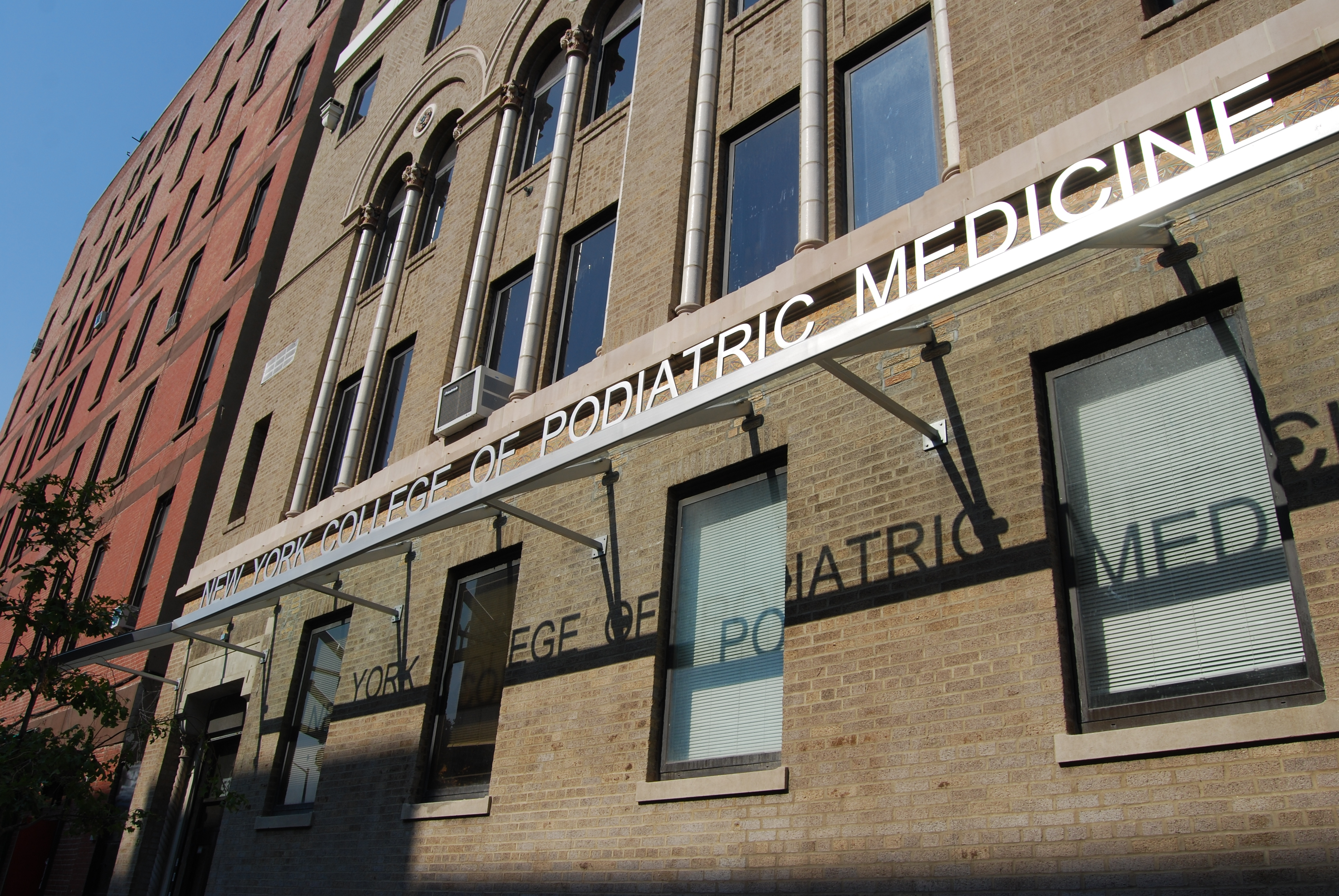
facade of the NYCPM building

The New York College of Podiatric Medicine (NYCPM) is a private podiatric medical school in New York City, New York. Founded in 1911, it is the oldest podiatric medical school in the United States, and since 2025 has been part of the Touro University System.

== History ==
Founded in 1911, NYCPM was the first podiatric medical school established in the United States. The college had its first home at 125th Street but rapidly outgrew its quarters, with three successive moves culminating in the erection in 1927 of the present College building in East Harlem. Dr. Maurice J. Lewi, a physician and educator, then serving as Secretary to the New York State Board of Examiners, was named the first president of the school.

From 1939 to 1955, the college was known as the Long Island University College of Podiatry. Upon dissolution of this affiliation, the college became an independent not-for-profit institution. In 1957, it was renamed the M.J. Lewi College of Podiatry, in honor of its founder and first president. In 1972, the college received its current name, the New York College of Podiatric Medicine.

A building grant in 1976 from the U.S. Department of Health, Education and Welfare enabled the creation of a new clinical training facility, an expanded library, and renovations to the existing college building. Completed in 1978, the training facility, the Foot Center of New York, provides clinical services and continues to be affiliated with the college.

=== Touro University ===
In August 2020, NYCPM announced a membership agreement to join Touro University. The transaction was subject to approval by the U.S. Department of Education, the New York State Department of Education, other regulators and relevant accreditors. In January 2025, Touro University bought the NYCPM property in Harlem for $42 million as part of its acquisition of the school. NYCPM became part of Touro University in February 2025.

== Academics ==
NYCPM's curriculum follows the standard structure of allopathic medical education in the United States: the first two years are devoted to the medical sciences and the latter two to clinical sciences. The third and fourth years feature clinical rotations at the Foot Center of New York and at affiliated NYC Health + Hospitals teaching hospitals, including Metropolitan Hospital, Harlem Hospital, and Lincoln Hospital, covering podiatry, podiatric surgery, general surgery, internal medicine, and emergency medicine.

NYCPM offers a dually registered joint DPM/MPH degree, in which the Master of Public Health portion is completed at and awarded through the Icahn School of Medicine at Mount Sinai.

== Outcomes ==
The college publishes outcome data under standards set by the Council on Podiatric Medical Education (CPME). According to its CPME-required reporting, NYCPM's three-year average results for 2023–2025 were a 96% pass rate on Part I of the American Podiatric Medical Licensing Examination (APMLE) and 99% on Part II, a 99% residency placement rate, and a 71% four-year graduation rate. Under the CPME reporting standard used by podiatric colleges, the published pass rates reflect all test takers within a calendar year, including those retaking the examination, rather than first-time test takers.

== Notable alumni ==
- Kelly Powers (1979–2024), podiatric surgeon and television commentator
- Dr. Irina Gelman, former Orange County Commissioner of Health, Nassau County Commissioner of Health
- Dr. Rock G. Positano, Founder and Director of the Non-surgical Foot and Ankle Service and the Heel Pain Center
