= Isachar Zacharie =

British-American chiropodist

- Born: 1825; Kent, England
- Died: 1900 (aged 74–75)
- Occupation: Podiatrist
- Known for: Abraham Lincoln's podiatrist

Isachar Zacharie (1825 – September 16, 1900) was a British-American podiatrist, plagiarist, and close confidant and advisor to President of the United States Abraham Lincoln. Born in England, he emigrated to the United States with his family and used falsified educational credentials and fake celebrity endorsements to establish a successful podiatry practice. Zacharie returned to Britain in the 1870s after failing in an attempt to fraudulently bill the U.S. government for podiatric services supposedly rendered by him during the American Civil War.

== Early life and education ==
Isachar Zacharie was born into a Jewish family in Kent, England in 1827. His father, Jan Zacharie, had immigrated to England from Prussia. By age ten, Isachar was working as a physician's apprentice. In the mid-1840s he emigrated, with his parents and siblings, to the United States and soon thereafter began the practice of podiatry, albeit without any formal training.

== Career ==
=== Podiatric practice ===
Falsely claiming to hold a medical degree from a school in Cuba and crediting himself with authorship of a podiatric manual he had plagiarized, Zacharie became a well-known podiatrist and received as patients at least five members of the United States Senate. To help promote his practice, he took out advertisements in newspapers that cited made-up endorsements from noted physicians published without their knowledge. Zacharie appropriated the idea of fake celebrity endorsements to drum-up business from John Eisenberg, another podiatrist of the period.

Shortly after the outbreak of the American Civil War, Zacharie composed a letter to United States Secretary of War Edwin M. Stanton proposing the creation of a corps of podiatrists within the United States Army. Stanton rejected the idea but nevertheless became one of Zacharie's patients. Through Stanton, Zacharie was introduced to Abraham Lincoln, who also began to seek treatment from him for his various foot ailments.

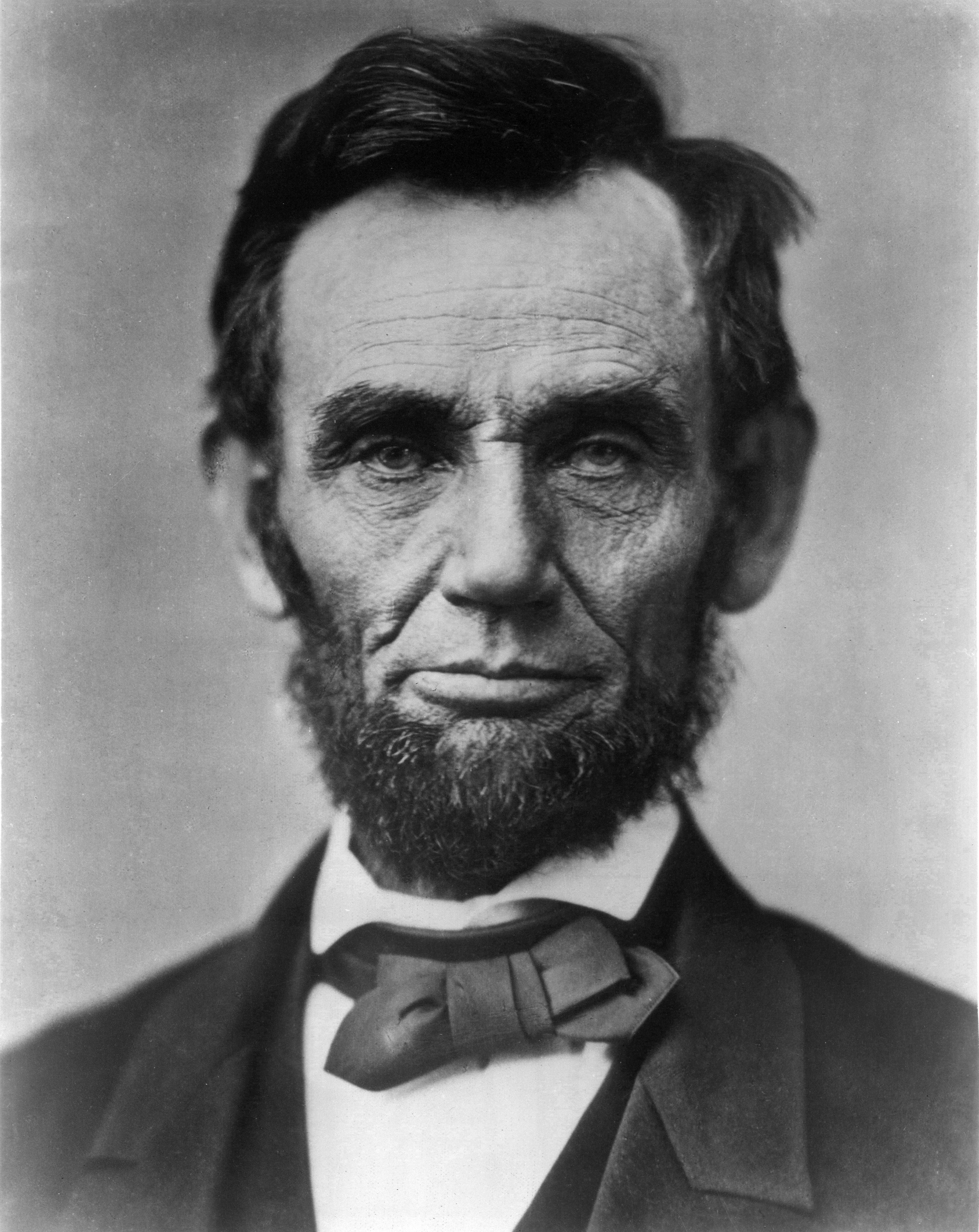
Isachar Zacharie served as Abraham Lincoln's (pictured) podiatrist.

=== Lincoln's confidant ===
The New York World wrote that Zacharie "enjoyed Mr. Lincoln’s confidence, perhaps more than any other private individual [and was] perhaps the most favored family visitor to the White House". Notably, he was one of Abraham Lincoln's few retainers who was able to maintain a good relationship with the unpredictable First Lady Mary Todd Lincoln, who was sometimes referred to by White House staff as "Her Satanic Majesty" due to her erratic and mercurial personality.

Lincoln reportedly spent hours with Zacharie in private consultation on matters of state. His counsel was so important that, during the same week he issued the preliminary Emancipation Proclamation, Lincoln also took time to compose no fewer than three letters of recommendation for Zacharie's podiatric practice. Lincoln reputedly recommended Zacharie to the Union Army's "Commission of Chiropodist General of the United States," though such a department never materialised.

In 1863, Lincoln was approached by Henry Wentworth Monk with a proposal for United States support in the creation of a homeland for the Jewish people. Lincoln signaled he was receptive to the idea since Isachar Zacharie was Jewish and had "so many times put me upon my feet". According to historian Charles Segal, Lincoln's support for U.S. backing of a Jewish homeland as a means to recognize his podiatrist is one of only three opinions about Jews attributed to Lincoln.

During the United States presidential election of 1864, Zacharie campaigned for Lincoln. After the election, he used his White House influence to secure a presidential pardon for Goodman L. Mordecai, Confederate commercial agent in the Bahamas.

==== Presidential envoy ====
In 1862, Lincoln sent Zacharie to U.S.-occupied New Orleans to consult with General Nathaniel P. Banks – recently installed as military governor of Louisiana – on the recruitment of Southern Jews to spy on the Confederate States.

The following year, Lincoln dispatched his podiatrist to Richmond, Virginia to open peace talks with the Confederate government; Zacharie met with Confederate foreign minister Judah P. Benjamin. Zacharie's proposed peace offer reportedly involved the invasion and conquest of Mexico which would be made into an American puppet state with Jefferson Davis as its ruler in exchange for Confederate capitulation. Nothing came of the discussions.

=== Questionable billing and return to Britain ===
Zacharie fell out of favor with America's political elite immediately after the death of his patron, Lincoln. In the early 1870s, he claimed to have served in the nonexistent position of "Chiropodist in Chief" to the Union Army during the Civil War and attempted to bill the U.S. Government an amount equal, in 2020, to one million dollars for services rendered. His claim was rejected and Zacharie was widely mocked in newspapers throughout the country for having tried to collect payment. He returned to the United Kingdom where he continued the practice of podiatry.

== Personal life ==
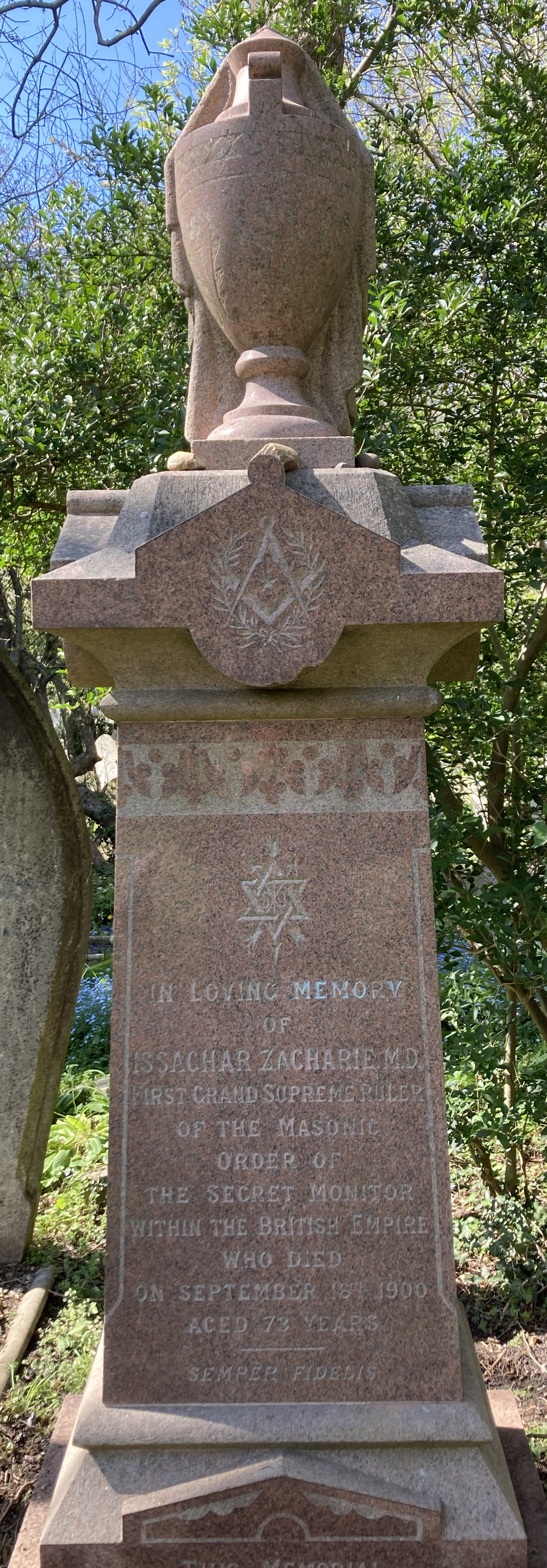
Grave of Isachar Zacharie in Highgate Cemetery

Zacharie married outside Judaism and raised his daughters as Christians.

After returning to the United Kingdom, Zacharie established an English lodge of the Order of the Secret Monitor, a U.S.-founded appendant order of Freemasonry, and was elevated to its Grand Supreme Ruler.

Widely considered a political opportunist, Zacharie was known to be vain, ambitious, and a sycophant. George Dennison, a United States Department of the Treasury official and cousin of Chief Justice of the United States Salmon P. Chase, derisively described him: "His vest is flowered velvet – his hair beautifully oiled ... in season and out of season, he fails not to announce himself as Confidential Agent or Correspondent to the President".

He died in 1900 and was buried with Masonic rites at London's Highgate Cemetery.

== See also ==
- Robert King Stone – Lincoln's physician
