= Order of the Secret Monitor =

Appendant order of Freemasonry

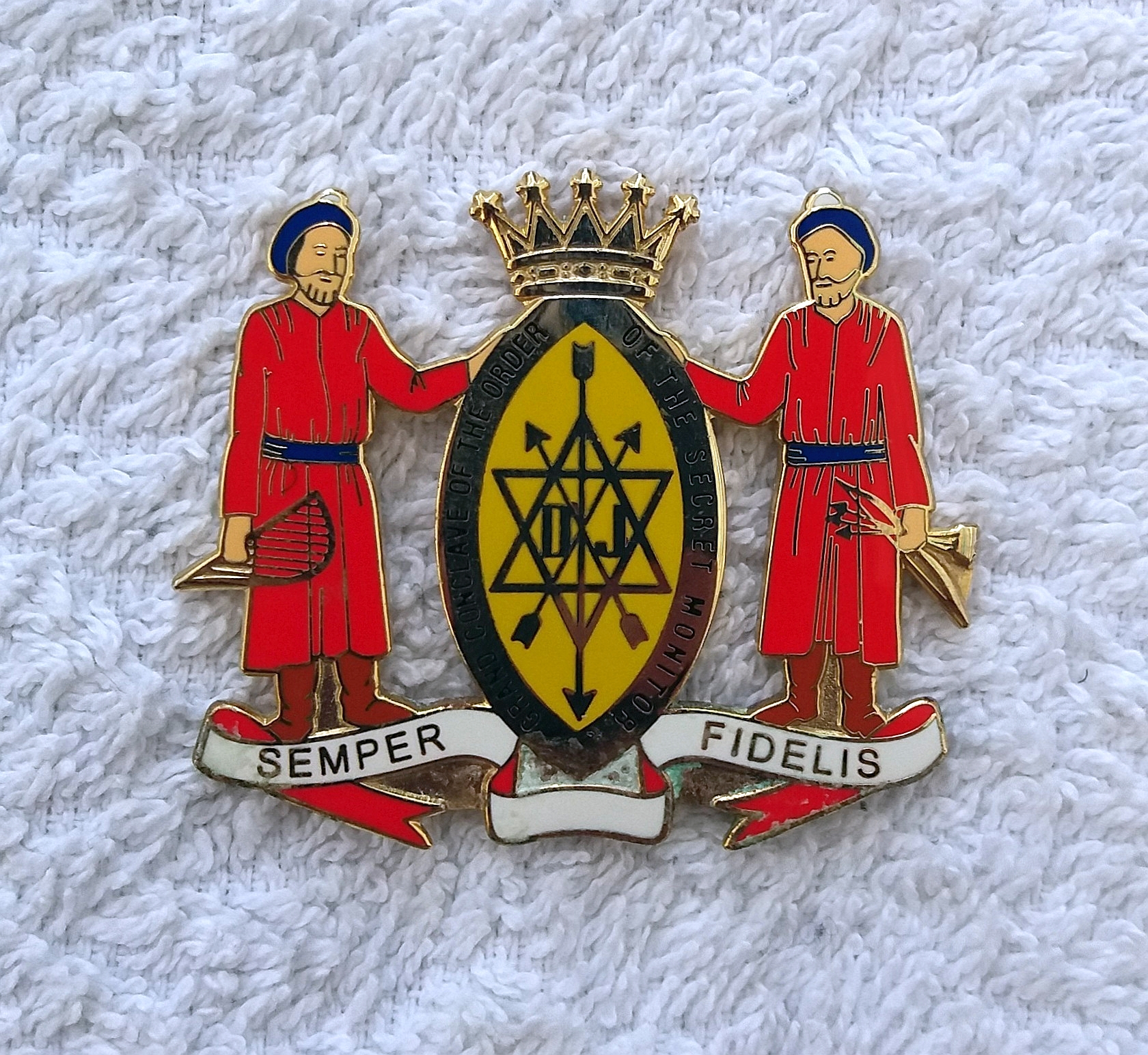
Order of the Secret Monitor badge

The Order of the Secret Monitor (OSM) is an appendant order of Freemasonry.

== History ==
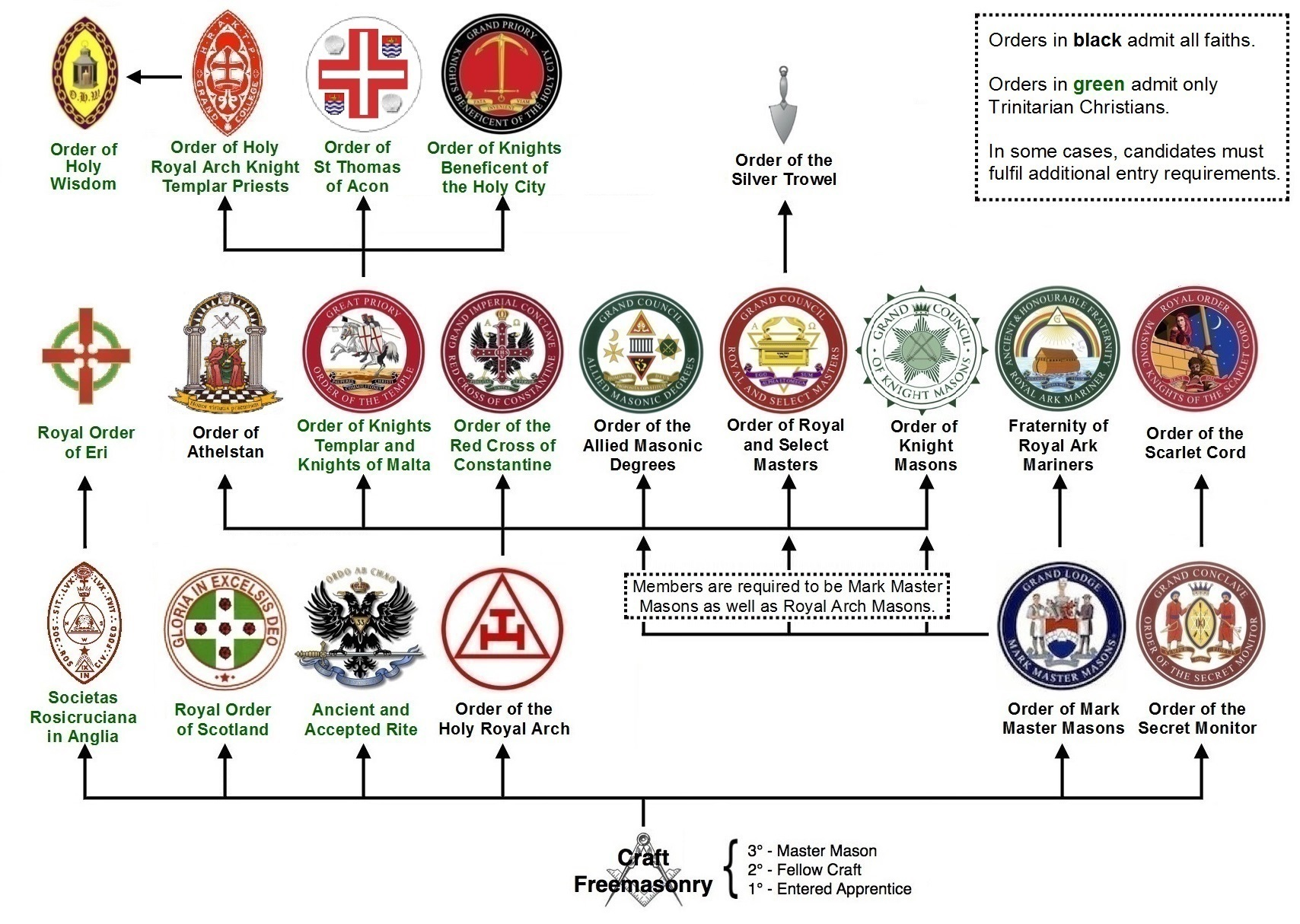
The position of the Order of the Secret Monitor among the Masonic appendant bodies in England and Wales

The first known references to the Order of the Secret Monitor are known to be Dutch in origin, being first mentioned in 1778 as the Order of Jonathan and David in connection with an Order of Jesus Christ. However, the Masonic degree as we know it today, arose in the United States around 1850, under various titles – "Brotherly Love," "Jonathan and David," and finally "Secret Monitor", as a side degree conferred by any Freemason who had received it himself.

It was taken to the United Kingdom by Isachar Zacharie when he returned from America following the American Civil War in 1875. Under Zacharie's leadership a Grand Council was formed in 1887, and the ritual was expanded to include two extra degrees, one of which pertained to the chair of Supreme Ruler. The degree gained in popularity, however, unfortunately for Zacharie, the Grand Council for the Allied Masonic Degrees had empowered their American body (or a similar name) to confer their version of the degree. This resulted in the Allied Grand Council denouncing the Grand Council of the Order of the Secret Monitor, and attempting to assume sole jurisdiction over the degree. However, in 1931 an arrangement was reached between the two orders, which saw the degree of the Order of the Secret Monitor being transferred from the Allied group of degrees. The Order is sometimes known as the Brotherhood of David and Jonathan. A Benevolent Fund was formed in 1901.

== Qualification for membership ==
All Master Masons are eligible for membership of this Order, but must be invited from a member.

== Ancient and Masonic Order of the Scarlet Cord ==
The Ancient and Masonic Order of the Scarlet Cord was at one time, an inner appendant order, of which all those who had taken their second degree were eligible for membership. The order was developed in the UK in 1889, and there are six classes or grades of membership. The first three grades meet in a consistory. In 2010, the order was re-established as a separate Masonic order in its own right. The current Grand Summus is Ian Currans.

== Structure and organisation ==
The Order meets in Conclaves, each with a Supreme Ruler at its head. There are three degrees in the order, as practised in the UK. The first degree, the Secret Monitor in which the legend of David and Jonathan is acted out in the ceremony of induction. The second degree, Prince, the admission ceremony is derived from the Book of Samuel in the Old Testament. The third degree, is the ceremony of installation of Supreme Ruler, and is normally carried out once a year at the installation meeting.

The Order is administered from Mark Masons' Hall, London.
