= American Podiatric Medical Association =

US professional medical organization

Coordinates: 39°0′28″N 77°6′48″W

The American Podiatric Medical Association (APMA) is a professional medical organization representing Doctors of Podiatric Medicine (podiatrists) within the United States. The organization was founded in 1912 and is headquartered in Bethesda, Maryland. Approximately 80% of podiatrists in the US are members of the APMA. Under the APMA are 53 component societies in individual states and other jurisdictions, as well as 21 affiliated and related societies. Doctors of Podiatric Medicine are physicians and surgeons who practice on the lower extremities, primarily on the foot, ankle and lower leg. The preparatory education of most DPMs includes four years of undergraduate work, followed by four years in an accredited podiatric medical school, followed by a residency of 3–4 years. After residency, podiatric physicians may choose to pursue further education through fellowships in any subspecialty of podiatric medicine.

APMA's Council on Podiatric Medical Education is the body designated by the US Department of Education to accredit the nation's podiatric medical schools. In addition, the Council has the responsibility to approve residency programs and continuing medical education programs. The Council recognizes certifying boards within podiatric medicine which meet its standards.

The official journal of the APMA is the Journal of the American Podiatric Medical Association, established in 1907.

== History ==
The National Association of Chiropodists, progenitor to the American Podiatric Medical Association, was established in 1912. It was renamed the American Podiatry Association (APA) in 1957. It was renamed the American Podiatric Medical Association (APMA) in 1984.
