= Bharti Rajput =

Podiatrist

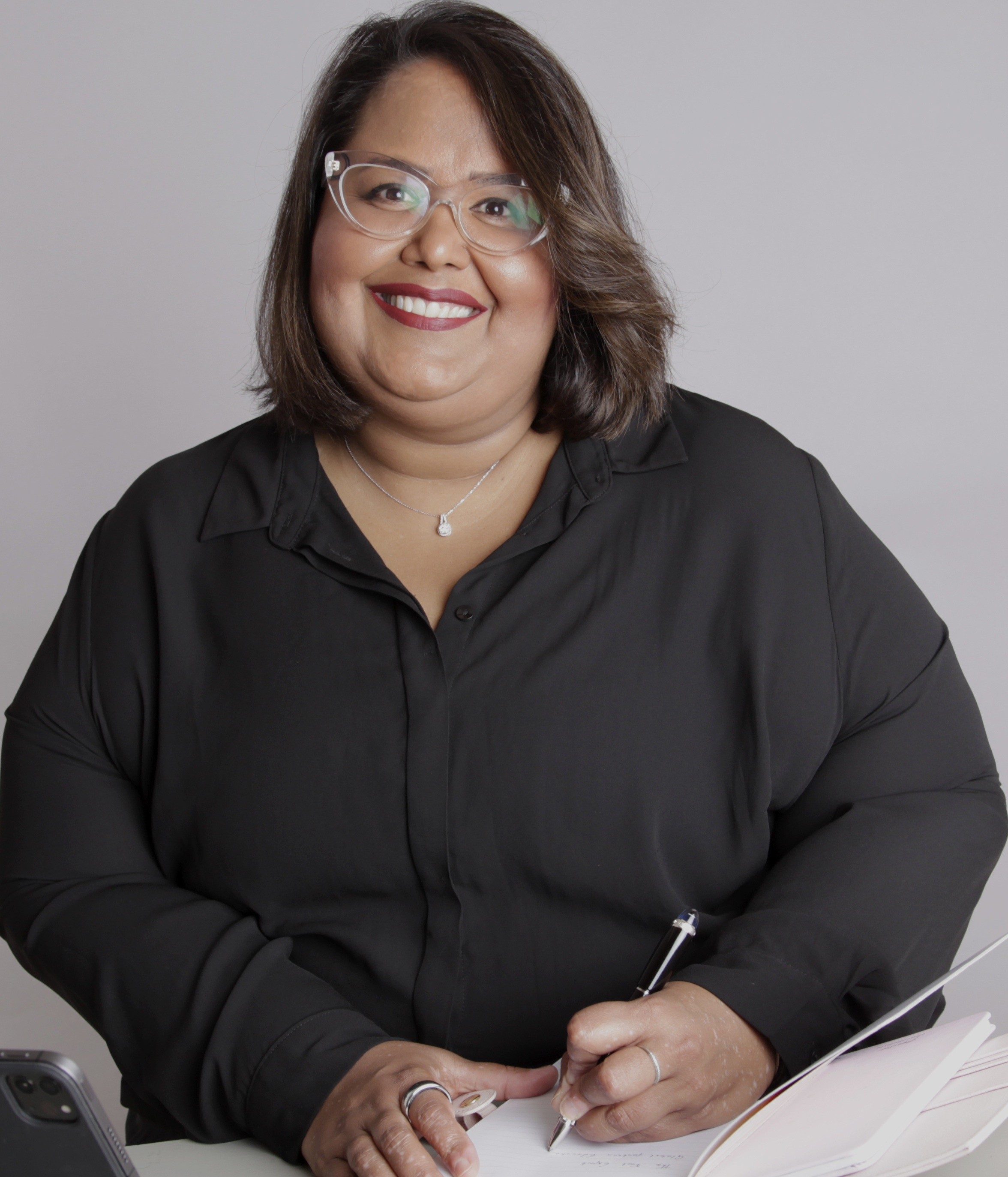
- Born: Nairobi, Kenya
- Education: Doctor of Philosophy (PhD) in Biomechanics and Human Movement Analysis; Bachelor of Science (Podiatric Medicine)
- Alma mater: University of Dundee, University College London
- Occupation(s): Podiatrist and entrepreneur

Bharti Rajput, also known as Dr B, is a podiatrist based in Dundee, Scotland, United Kingdom. She is the founder of Sole Body Soul, a podiatry clinic established in 2011. She is also an Ambassador for Women's Enterprise Scotland, an organization that supports initiatives for women in business.

She has received several awards for her contributions to podiatry and foot health, including an MBE (Member of the Order of the British Empire) for her services to podiatry and the local economy, awarded during the Queen Elizabeth II's birthday 2017.

== Early life and education ==
Rajput was born in Kenya to Indian parents and later moved to the United Kingdom as a teenager. She earned a degree in Podiatric Medicine from University College London and later completed her PhD in Biomechanics and Human Movement Analysis at the University of Dundee in Scotland.

== Career ==
In 2004, Rajput published a case study on the role of footwear in the development of plantar fasciitis. Her research identified that pain in the plantar medial calcaneal area improved after discontinuing the use of certain footwear.

In 2011, she founded Sole Body Soul, a podiatry clinic. In 2017, she was awarded the MBE for her services to podiatry and the local economy, which was presented by King Charles III at Buckingham Palace.

Rajput is also involved in charitable work. She worked with the Dundee/Meru Partnership to help raise funds for schools in Meru, Kenya. She also established the Sole Body Soul Foundation, which supports initiatives for women and children locally and globally. The foundation raised £350 through an event at her clinic, where treatment fees were donated to the Meru Project and The Brae Riding for the Disabled, a local charity.

== Publications ==
- Cochrane, Lynda; Wang, Weijie; Abboud, Rami; Wang, Yuqiao; Leese, Graham; Rajput, Bharti (2008). "Integrating pressure distribution measurement and gait analysis: A contribution to the diabetic foot". Clinical Biomechanics.
- Cochrane, Lynda; Rajput, Bharti (2006). "Pot bellies and motion analysis: development and validation of a novel lower limb model for use in centrally obse patients". Journal of Biomechanics.
- Bharti, Rajput (2006). "Vehicle ergonomics: Effect of automobile seating on foot posture and callus development". Journal of Biomechanics.
- Bharti, Rajput (2006). "Biomechanics and the diabetic foot: a novel approach to measurement". Journal of Biomechanics.
- Bharti, Rajput (2004). "Common ignorance, major problem: the role of footwear in plantar fasciitis". The Foot. 14 (4): 214–218. doi:10.1016/j.foot.2004.06.004.

== Awards and recognition ==
- 2015: Selected as an ambassador for Women's Enterprise Scotland, supporting initiatives for women in business.
- 2016: Won the Association of Scottish Businesswomen's Most Enterprising Business Award.
- 2016: Most Enterprising Business in Dundee award at the 2016 Women Ahead Awards.
- 2017: Awarded as MBE for services to podiatry and the economy of Dundee, Scotland.
