= American College of Foot and Ankle Surgeons =

US professional medical society

- Abbreviation: ACFAS
- Formation: 1942
- Legal status: 501(c)(3)
- Headquarters: Chicago, Illinois
- Region served: United States of America
- Members: >7,800 podiatrists
- President: Michael Cornelison, DPM, FACFAS
- Publication: Journal of Foot & Ankle Surgery
- Staff: 16 (2020)
- Website: www.acfas.org

The American College of Foot and Ankle Surgeons (ACFAS) is a professional medical society of foot and ankle surgeons in the United States (US). Each of the over 7,700 members have graduated from one of nine podiatric medical schools in the US with a Doctor of Podiatric Medicine degree. ACFAS publishes the Journal of Foot & Ankle Surgery.

== Background ==
ACFAS is a professional medical organization of over 7,700 podiatric foot and ankle surgeons practicing in the United States and was formed in 1942. Informing members of the latest techniques and advances of surgical care of the foot, ankle, and related lower extremity are the primary goals of the ACFAS. The college also functions in representing foot and ankle surgeons, helping to advance and improve the standards of education and surgical skill in foot and ankle care in the US.

ACFAS members are Doctors of Podiatric Medicine (DPM) and are graduates of one of the nine accredited podiatric medical schools in the United States. Following graduation, ACFAS physician members complete a podiatric surgical residency program of up to four years. Board certified members become Fellows of the college and are board certified by the American Board of Foot and Ankle Surgery (ABFAS). The ABFAS is the surgical board for podiatric physicians recognized by the Joint Committee on the Recognition of Specialty Boards.

== Publications ==
The college's official publication is the Journal of Foot & Ankle Surgery. ACFAS also provides a website for patient education on foot and ankle conditions and when to seek the care of a podiatric surgeon.
