= Samuel Merritt University =

Private university in Oakland, California, U.S.

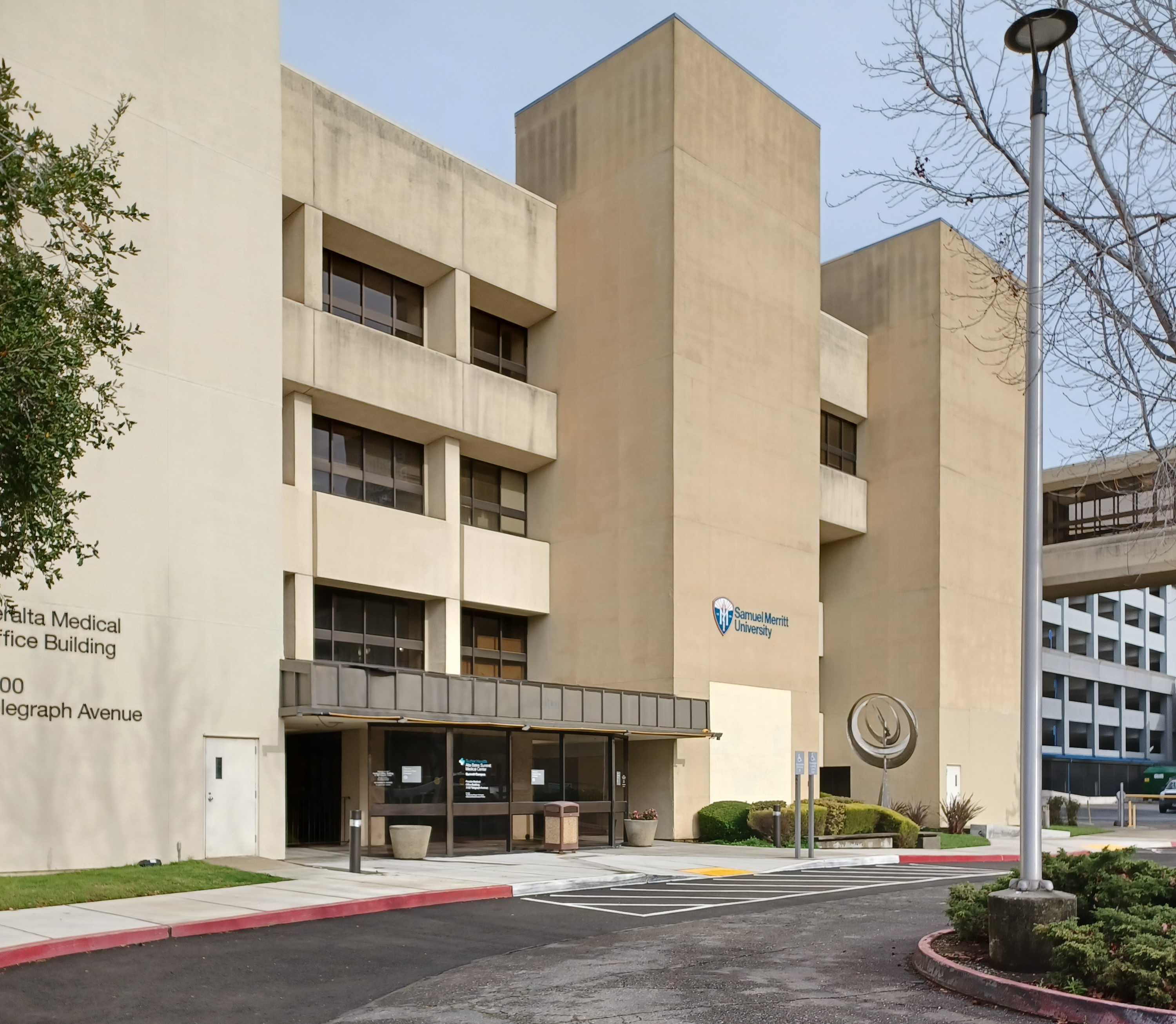
- Former campus, 2023
- Type: Private university
- Established: 1909; 117 years ago
- Endowment: $49.1 million (2020)
- President: Ching-Hua Wang
- Faculty: 204
- Undergraduates: 768
- Postgraduates: 736
- Doctoral students: 502
- Location: 525 12th St., Oakland, California, United States; 37°48′12″N 122°16′25″W
- Campus: Urban
- Website: www.samuelmerritt.edu
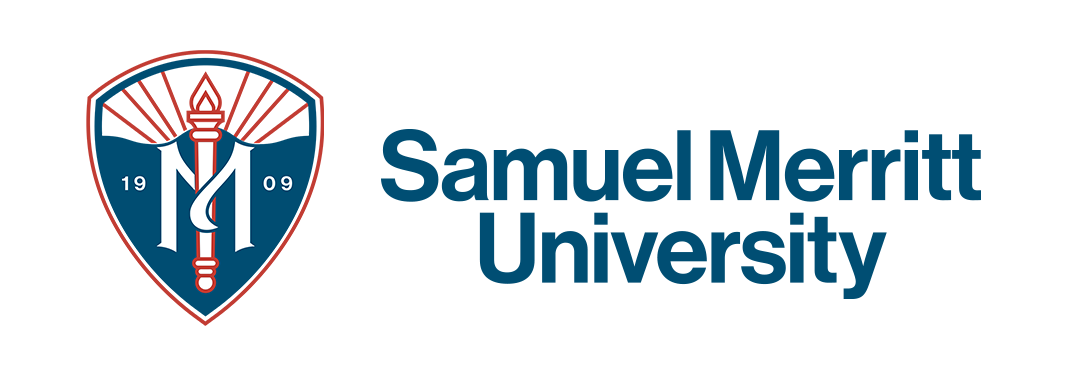

Samuel Merritt University (SMU) is a private university focused on health sciences with its main campus in Oakland, California, United States, and other facilities in Sacramento, Foster City and Fresno. Founded in 1909 as a hospital school of nursing and formerly known as Samuel Merritt College, it was an affiliate of the Sutter Health Network and Alta Bates Summit Medical Center until January 2022, when it became an independent institution. It encompasses three colleges, the College of Nursing, College of Health Sciences, and College of podiatric medicine, and is the only provider of physical therapists, occupational therapists, and physician assistants and a major source of nurses in the greater East Bay.

== History ==
The institution opened in 1909 as the nursing school of Samuel Merritt Hospital in Oakland, part of the legacy of Samuel Merritt; the opening of the hospital and nursing school was delayed by the 1906 earthquake, which damaged the not yet completed building. In 1981 it became Samuel Merritt College, replacing its diploma in nursing with a joint four-year nursing degree offered in partnership with Saint Mary's College of California in Moraga. It introduced graduate-level courses in the late 20th century: master's degrees in physical therapy in 1990, in nursing in 1992 (with specializations for nurse anesthetists, family nurse practitioners, and case managers), occupational therapy in 1994, and for physician assistants in 1999 (the first program in the Western United States). In 2002 the California School of Podiatric Medicine, now the California College of Podiatric Medicine, merged with Samuel Merritt College, adding a doctoral degree, and it also began offering a clinical doctorate in physical therapy. In 2008, the joint degree program with Saint Mary's was replaced with collaborations with Saint Mary's, Mills College and Holy Names University in Oakland, and Notre Dame de Namur University in Belmont under which undergraduates transferred to Samuel Merritt for the specialized nursing portion of their degree. The college added its first satellite learning center in 2001, in Sacramento, expanded into distance and online learning in the 2000s, and changed its name to Samuel Merritt University in 2009. Through a series of mergers, Samuel Merritt Hospital had become part of the Summit campus of Sutter Health's Alta Bates Summit Medical Center; in January 2022, SMU became independent of Sutter Health. In 2023, SMU added three new programs: a bachelor's degree in kinesiology and master's degrees in social work and nursing-clinical leadership education.

The university's enrollment exceeded 2,000 graduate and undergraduate students by 2022. It declined in the COVID-19 pandemic but was once more approximately 2,000 students in 2025.

In January 2026, the university moved from the Pill Hill neighborhood of Oakland to a newly built 10-story campus downtown.

Ching-Hua Wang became president and CEO of Samuel Merritt University in 2018, succeeding Sharon Diaz, who had been president for 36 years. In November 2026, Wang was placed on leave.

== Academics ==
SMU is a university dedicated to health sciences, including three degrees at the undergraduate level in nursing and kinesiology. Podiatric medicine, physical therapy, occupational therapy, and nursing practice are all offered at the doctoral level while the physician assistant program is offered at the master's level. As of 2018, the university's average graduation rate was 95 percent and licensure pass rates were 90 percent or above for first-time test takers in six programs.

=== Accreditation ===
The university is accredited by the WASC Senior College and University Commission (WSCUC) and its programs are accredited by their corresponding accreditation bodies:

School/department	Program(s)	Accreditation
College of Nursing	Bachelor of Science in Nursing (BSN) Accelerated Bachelor of Science in Nursing (ABSN) RN to BSN Entry Level Master of Science in Nursing (ELMSN): Case Management; Family Nurse Practitioner (FNP); Master of Science in Nursing (Post Professional): Case Management; Family Nurse Practitioner (FNP); Nurse Anesthesia (CRNA); Clinical Leadership Education; Doctor of Nursing Practice (DNP): Family Nurse Practitioner (FNP); Psychiatric Mental Health; Online	Commission on Collegiate Nursing Education Bachelor of Science in Nursing (BSN); Registered Nurse to Bachelor of Science in Nursing (RN to BSN); Accelerated Bachelor of Science in Nursing (ABSN) Approved by the California Board of Registered Nursing
College of Podiatric Medicine	Doctor of Podiatric Medicine (DPM)	Council on Podiatric Medical Education
College of Health Sciences	Bachelor of Science in Kinesiology - Sports Medicine Master of Physician Assistant Program Master of Social Work Doctor of Physical Therapy Program Doctor and Master of Occupational Therapy Program	Master of Physician Assistant Program: Accreditation Review Commission on Education Doctor of Physical Therapy Program: Commission on Accreditation in Physical Therapy Education (CAPTE) Doctor and Master of Occupational Therapy Program: Accreditation Council for Occupational Therapy Education (ACOTE)
