= Podiatrist =

Medical professional devoted to foot treatment

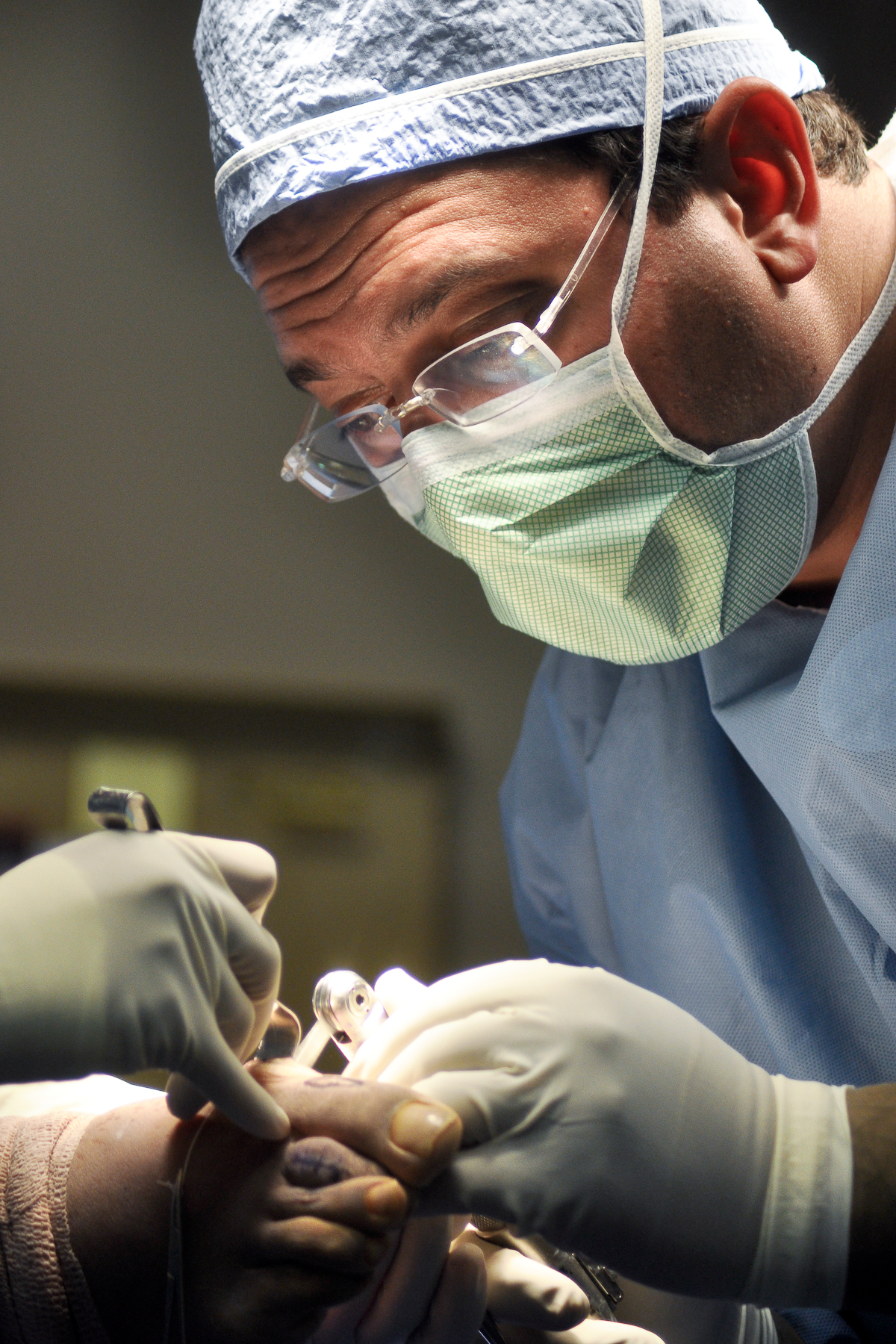
- Podiatrist performing bunion surgery

Occupation
- Names: Podiatrist; Podiatric surgeon; Foot and ankle surgeon; Doctor of podiatric medicine; Podiatric physician
- Occupation type: Specialty
- Activity sectors: Medicine, podiatric medicine, sports medicine, endocrinology, orthopedic surgery, plastic surgery, dermatology, radiology, biomechanics, rheumatology, neurology

Description
- Competencies: Expertise in medicine, surgical skills, ethics, critical thinking, analytical skills, professionalism, management skills, and communication skills.
- Education required: Doctor of Podiatric Medicine; 3 year residency; Other countries with limited/minimal scope of practice; Master of Podiatric Medicine; Bachelor of Podiatric Medicine; Bachelor of Podiatry; Bachelor of Podiatry (Honours)
- Fields of employment: Hospitals, clinics

A podiatrist (/poʊˈdaɪ.ətrɪst/ poh-DY-ə-trist) is a medical professional devoted to the treatment of disorders of the foot, ankle, and related structures of the leg. The term originated in North America but has now become the accepted term in the English-speaking world for all practitioners of podiatric medicine. In the United States, the term chiropodist is still occasionally used, but is now regarded as antiquated.

In the United States, podiatrists are educated and licensed as Doctors of Podiatric Medicine (DPM). They are not usually considered to be medical doctors. The DPM superseded the historical DSC (Doctor of Surgical Chiropody) degree in the 1960s. The preparatory education of most podiatric physicians—similar to the paths of traditional physicians (MD or DO)—includes four years of undergraduate work, followed by four years in an accredited podiatric medical school, followed by a three- or four-year hospital-based podiatry residency. Optional one- to two-year fellowship in foot and ankle reconstruction, surgical limb salvage, sports medicine, plastic surgery, pediatric foot and ankle surgery, and wound care is also available. Podiatric medical residencies and fellowships are accredited by the Council on Podiatric Medical Education (CPME). The overall scope of podiatric practice varies from state to state with a common focus on foot and ankle surgery.

In many countries, the term podiatrist refers to allied health professionals who specialize in the treatment of the lower extremity, particularly the foot. Podiatrists in these countries are specialists in the diagnosis and nonsurgical treatment of foot pathology. In some circumstances, these practitioners will further specialise and, following further training, perform reconstructive foot and ankle surgery. In the United States, a podiatrist or podiatric surgeon shares the same model of medical education as osteopathic physicians (DO) and doctors of medicine (MD) with 4 years of medical school and 3-4 years of surgical residency focusing on the lower extremity.

== Podiatric specialties ==
Podiatrists treat a wide variety of foot and lower extremity conditions through nonsurgical and surgical approaches. The American Board of Podiatric Medicine (ABPM) offers a comprehensive board qualification and certification process in podiatric medicine and orthopedics. Subspecialties of podiatry include:

- Reconstructive surgery
- General podiatry
- Podiatric medicine
- Podiatric orthopedics
- Podiatric sports medicine
- Lower extremity plastic surgery
- High-risk wound care
- Podiatric rheumatology
- Neuropodiatry
- Oncopodiatry (podiatric oncology)
- Podiatric vascular medicine
- Podiatric dermatology
- Podoradiology
- Podiatric gerontology
- Podiatric diabetology (limb salvage and wound care)
- Podopediatrics
- Forensic podiatry

== Podiatry assistant ==
In Australia, Certificate IV in Allied Health Assistance is the required qualification to work as a podiatry assistant. The podiatry assistant can work as a part of a podiatric medical team in either clinical or non-clinical settings. Common professional accreditation pathways include:

- Podiatric nurse
- Foot carer/nurse
- Podiatry support worker
- Podiatry technician
- Podiatry hygienist
- Foot health professional
- Podiatric surgical nurse
- Foot hygienist
- Foot health practitioner
- Podiatric medical assistant

== Podiatric surgery ==
Podiatric surgery is concerned with the diagnosis and surgical treatment of disorders of the foot and ankle:

- Structural deformities, including bunions, hammertoes, flat feet, high arches, and bone spurs
- Heel pain
- Nerve entrapment
- Joint degeneration and arthrosis
- Skin and nail conditions
- Congenital deformities such as clubfoot and polydactyly
- Trauma, including fractures and dislocations
- Ankle fractures
- Deformity correction/reconstruction for things like malunion, limb length discrepancy, Charcot neuroarthropathy
- Joint fusions for arthritis and other painful joint destructive conditions in the foot and ankle
- Total ankle replacements
- Total or hemi-joint replacements

== Responsibilities ==
Podiatrists' roles include dealing with the conditions resulting from bone and joint disorders such as arthritis and soft-tissue and muscular pathologies as well as neurological and circulatory diseases.

Podiatrists are also able to diagnose and treat any complications of the above which affect the lower limb, including skin and nail disorders, corns, calluses and ingrown toenails. Foot injuries and infections gained through sport or other activities are also diagnosed and treated by podiatrists.

Podiatrists scope of practice within Australia allows them to;

- Refer for a range of diagnostic imaging: x-ray, ultrasound, MRI etc.

- Assess a range of special patient groups including, paediatric patients, older patients, high-risk patients, sporting patients.

- Assess and treat a wide range of musculoskeletal injuries, including, fractures (acute & bone stress injuries), tendon pathologies (Achilles tendiopathy, posterior tibial tendon dysfunction, tibalis posterior tendonitis etc), plantar heel pain (plantar fasciopathy/fasciitis), ankle sprains, chronic ankle instability, foot/ankle/knee arthritis, medial tibial stress syndroms (MTSS / "shin splints").

- Utilise a range of therapeutic modalities including, exercise prescription, electrotherapies (shockwave, TENS, laser therapy, ultrasound), orthoses, footwear prescriptions, pharmacological prescriptions (for endorsed prescribers).

- Perform partial nail avulsion surgeries (to treat ingrown toenails).

- Inject local anaesthetics.

- Perform routine & general nail care treatments.

- Assess & manage pediatric pathologies.

- Assess & manage high-risk patient groups in both private and hospital settings, including; perform neurovascular assessments, diabetic wound care.

== Education and training ==
=== United States ===
In the United States, medical and surgical care of the foot and ankle is mainly provided by two groups of professionals: podiatrists (Doctor of Podiatric Medicine or DPM) and orthopedists (MDs or DOs). The first two years of podiatric medical school is similar to training that either Doctors of Medicine (M.D.) or Doctors of Osteopathic Medicine (D.O.) receive, but with an emphasized scope on foot, ankle, and lower extremity. To enter a college of podiatric medicine, the student must first complete at least three years or 90 semester hours of college credit at an accredited institution. Biology, chemistry, organic chemistry, physics (all science courses require a lab) and English are among the required subjects. Over 95% of the students who enter a college of podiatric medicine have a bachelor's degree. Many have also completed some graduate study. Before entering a college of podiatric medicine, the student must take the MCAT (Medical College Admissions Test). In 2025, the average GPA was 3.38 and the average science GPA was 3.23. The average MCAT was 496.22 In 2019, the average MCAT score for matriculants was 499.6 and the average undergraduate cGPA was 3.3. There are 11 colleges of podiatric medicine in the United States. They all receive accreditation from the Council on Podiatric Medical Education, which is recognized by the U.S. Secretary of Education and the Council on Higher Education Accreditation. All of the colleges grant the degree of Doctor of Podiatric Medicine (DPM).

The four-year podiatric medical school is followed by a hospital based residency, which is hands-on post-doctoral training. Their residency model was standardized to 3-years of post-graduate training in 2011 (with some programs lasting 4 years in length), and the residency is now known as the Podiatric Medicine and Surgery Residency (PMSR) with almost all now having an added Reconstructive Rearfoot and Ankle (RRA) credential. Podiatric residents rotate through core areas of medicine and surgery. They work alongside their MD and DO counterparts in such rotations as emergency medicine, internal medicine, infectious disease, behavioral medicine, physical medicine and rehabilitation (PM&R), vascular surgery, general surgery, orthopedic surgery, plastic surgery, dermatology and podiatric surgery and medicine. Fellowship training is available after residency in such fields such as foot and ankle traumatology, lower extremity reconstruction, or limb salvage.

Upon completion of their residency, podiatrists can decide to become board certified by a number of specialty boards including the American Board of Podiatric Medicine (ABPM) and/or the American Board of Foot and Ankle Surgery (ABFAS), which are both approved by the profession's accrediting agency, the CPME, and both have been certifying podiatrists since the 1970s. Though the ABPM and ABFAS are more common, other boards not recognized by CPME are challenging the status quo confer board qualified/certified status. The American Board of Multiple Specialties in Podiatry (ABMSP) is one additional option and has been certifying podiatrists since 1998.

Medical Group Management Association (MGMA) data shows that a general podiatrist with a single specialty earns a median salary of $230,357, while one with a multi-specialty practice type earns $270,263. However, a podiatric surgeon is reported to earn with a single specialty, with the median at $304,474 compared to that of multi-specialty podiatric surgeons of $286,201. First-year salaries around $150,000 with performance and productivity incentives are common if working as an associate. Private practice revenues for solo podiatrists vary widely, with the majority of solo practices grossing between $200,000 and $600,000 before overhead.

=== Australia ===
Australian podiatrists complete an undergraduate degree of Bachelor of Podiatry or Bachelor of Podiatric Medicine ranging from 3 to 4 years of education. The first 2 years of this program are generally focused on various biomedical science subjects including anatomy, medical chemistry, biochemistry, physiology, pathophysiology, sociology and patient psychology, similar to the medical curriculum and that of other allied health disciplines.

The following two years will then be spent focusing on podiatry specific areas such as podiatric biomechanics and human gait, podiatric orthopaedics or the non-surgical management of foot abnormalities, pharmacology and prescribing, general medicine, general pathology, local and general anaesthesia, and surgical procedural techniques such as partial and total nail avulsions, matricectomy, cryotherapy, wound debridement and care, enucleation, and other cutaneous and electro-surgical procedures such as electro-desiccation, fulagaration and electrosection. During the initial two years of study, podiatry students begin clinical placements, practicals and skills labs which give them exposure to a wide range of patients and treatment modalities. For example; diabetic foot assessments, gait & biomechanical assessments, orthoses manufacture, clinical history taking, diagnostic imaging and general podiatry care.

Other topics studied in the final years of the degree include, podiatric sports medicine, exercise prescription & rehabilitation, advanced wound care and paediatric podiatry (paediatric gait, growth & developmental disorders).

Postgraduate courses in podiatric therapeutics and prescribing are required for having endorsements in scheduled medicines.

The Australian Podiatry Association supports Career Framework credentials, that recognise advanced competencies and clinical skills of podiatrists in Australia. The purpose is to provide an enhanced career progression beyond initial training that is both clear and transparent to consumers and the profession. In awarding the credential, the APodA can verify podiatrists have demonstrated and provided evidence of competency in their clinical interest area and undergone a rigorous assessment process.

The APodA currently awards credentials in two clinical interest areas: - Paediatrics - Sports/Biomechanics

The curriculum and assessment of The APodA Career Framework has been structured around the CanMEDS framework. CanMEDS is a recognised and adopted physician competency framework. A credentialled podiatrist will therefore personify and seamlessly integrate the competencies of all seven CanMEDS Roles:

1. Medical Expert
2. Communicator
3. Collaborator
4. Leader
5. Health Advocate
6. Scholar
7. Professional

Only current APodA members are eligible to promote their credentialling. That is, the title is only available to be used by active members of the Australian Podiatry Association.

All podiatrists are required to register with Australian Health Practitioner Regulation Agency (AHPRA) prior to be licensed to practice in Australia. Registration is required annually and there is a minimum registration standard that includes; - Completing 20 hours of continuing professional development (CPD) hours (additional hours are required for podiatric surgeons and podiatrists who are endorsed to prescribe scheduled medicines). - Having current professional indemnity insurance. - Having current CPR, First Aid & Anaphylaxis training.

=== Podiatric surgery in Australia ===
Podiatric surgeons are specialist podiatrists who have completed extensive, post-graduate medical and surgical training and perform reconstructive surgery of the foot and ankle. The qualifications of podiatric surgeons are recognised by Australian state and federal governments. It is an approved specialty by the AHPRA. Podiatric surgeons are included within both the Health Insurance Act and the National Health Act. The Podiatry Board of Australia recognizes 3 pathways to attain specialist registration as a Podiatric Surgeon:

- Fellowship of the Australasian College of Podiatric Surgeons
- Doctor of Podiatric Surgery, University of Western Australia
- Eligibility for Fellowship of the Australasian College of Podiatric Surgeons

Podiatric surgical qualifications are a post-graduate speciality of the podiatric profession. Before attaining a podiatric surgical fellowship qualification, a podiatrist must complete an extensive training program, including:

1. Bachelor of Applied Science degree, majoring in Podiatry (4 years)
2. Minimum of 2 years post-graduate clinical practice
3. Master of Podiatry (2 years full-time university degree)
4. A 3-stage surgical fellowship training under supervision of the ACPS (4 to 6 years)
5. International residency training (usually in the UK and USA)
6. Demonstrated mastery of knowledge in foot and ankle surgery by passing oral and written examinations administered by the ACPS

=== New Zealand ===
Only one university, Auckland University of Technology (AUT), offers training to become a podiatrist. Podiatrists must have a Bachelor of Health Science majoring in podiatry from AUT, or an overseas qualification recognised by the Podiatrists Board of New Zealand, be registered with the Podiatrists Board of New Zealand and have a current Annual Practising Certificate.

=== Canada ===
In Canada, the definition and scope of the practice of podiatry varies provincially. For instance, in some provinces like British Columbia and Alberta, the standards are the same as in the United States where the Doctor of Podiatric Medicine (DPM) is the accepted qualification.

Quebec, too, has recently changed to the DPM level of training, although other academic designations may also register. Also in Quebec, in 2004, Université du Québec à Trois-Rivières started the first program of Podiatric Medicine in Canada based on the American definition of podiatry. In the prairie and Atlantic provinces, the standard was originally based on the British model now called podiatry (chiropody). That model of podiatry is currently the accepted model for most of the world including the United Kingdom, Australia and South Africa.

The province of Ontario has been registering Chiropodists since July 1993 (when the Ontario Government imposed a cap on new podiatrists). If a registered podiatrist from outside of Ontario relocates to Ontario they are required to register with the province and practice as a chiropodist. Podiatrists who were practising in Ontario previous to the imposed provincial cap were 'grandfathered' and allowed to keep the title of podiatrist as a subclass of chiropody. The scope of these 'grandfathered' (mostly American trained) podiatrists includes boney procedures of the forefoot and the ordering of x-rays in addition to the scope of the chiropodist.

In Ontario, podiatrists are required to have a "Doctor of Podiatric Medicine/DPM" degree (a post-baccalaureate, four-year degree), where the majority of chiropodists currently practising hold a post-secondary diploma in chiropody, although many also have some university level schooling or a baccalaureate degree in the sciences or in another field. Podiatrists may bill OHIP for their services; chiropodists may not. Podiatrists may "communicate a diagnosis" to their patients (or to their patients' representatives) and perform surgical procedures on the bones of the forefoot; chiropodists may do neither.

Chiropodists and podiatrists are regulated by the College of Chiropodists of Ontario, which had 594 chiropodists and 65 podiatrists registered as of 29 July 2015.

The only English-speaking Chiropody program in Canada, in which also has a working Chiropody Clinic on campus for students to treat patients under the supervision of licensed Chiropodists is The Michener Institute. According to The Michener Institute website, Chiropody is a branch of medical science that involves the assessment and management of foot and lower limb disorders. This includes the management of a wide variety of disorders, injuries, foot deformities, infections and local manifestations of systemic conditions. A Chiropodist is a primary care professional practising in podiatric medicine in Ontario that specializes in assessment, management and prevention of diseases and disorders of the foot. An essential member of the inter professional healthcare team, the Chiropodist is skilled in assessing the needs of their patients and of managing both chronic and acute conditions affecting foot and lower limb function. As a primary care provider capable of independent clinical practice, these skills are often practised independent of medical referral and medical supervision.

=== United Kingdom ===
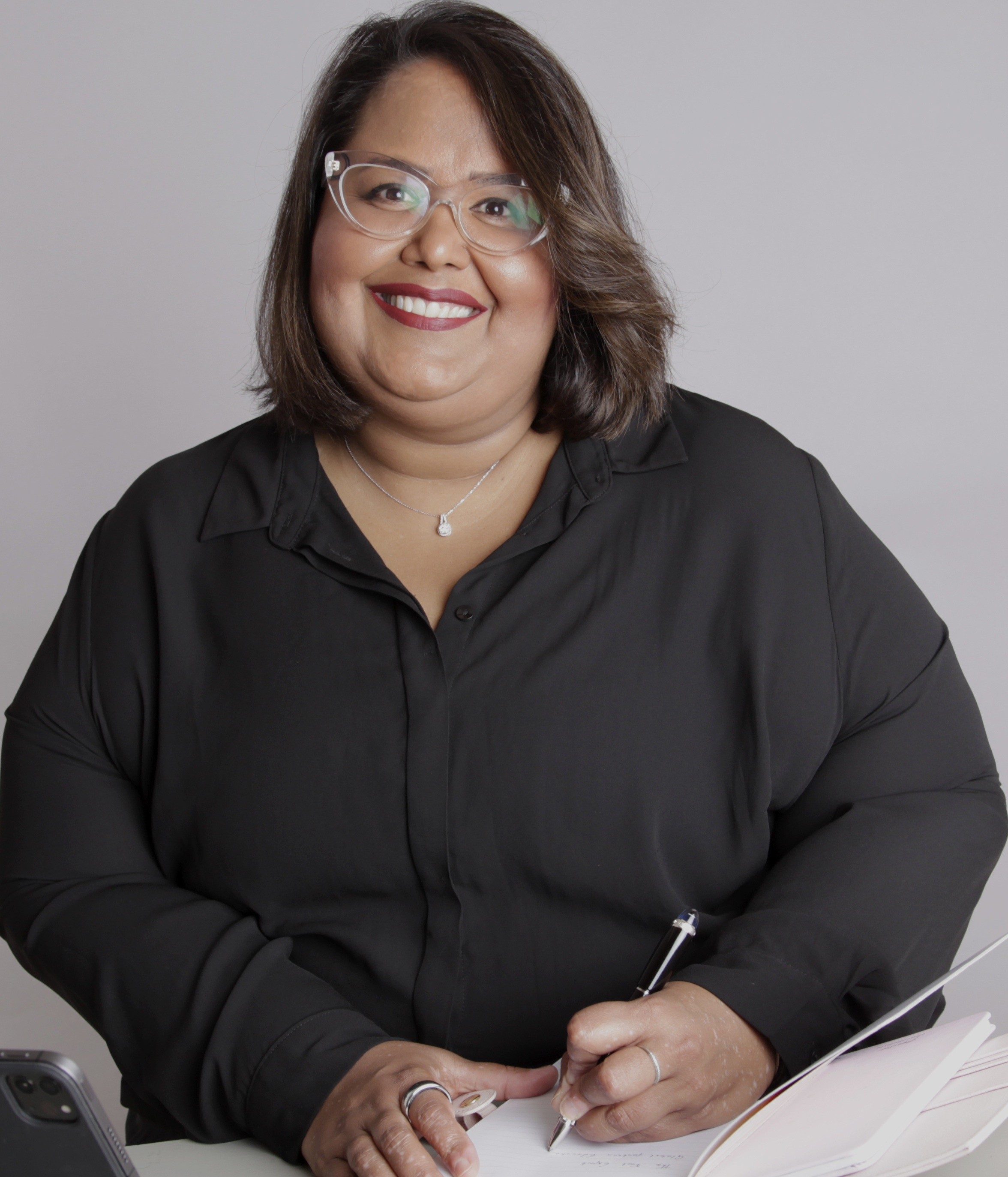
Bharti Rajput, a podiatrist in Scotland

In the UK, podiatrists usually undertake a 3-year undergraduate Bachelor of Science (Podiatry). Podiatric Surgeons usually undertake fellowships and postgraduate studies. The scope of practice of a podiatrist falls into four key categories:

- General clinics
- Biomechanics
- High-risk patient management
- Surgery.

There are two levels of surgical practice. As part of general podiatric care, podiatrists as HPC (Health Professions Council)-registered practitioners are involved with nail-and-minor-soft-tissue surgical procedures and qualified to administer local anaesthetics.

From 1 August 2012, the HPC is being rebranded to the HCPC (Health & Care Professions Council) as they are expanding their remit to include Social Workers. The old term of "State Registered" has been defunct for some time and is no longer used since the creation of the HPC.

Some podiatrists go on to develop and train as podiatric surgeons, who surgically manage bone and joint disorders within the foot. It is to this latter group (Podiatric Surgeons) that the guidelines apply. Fellowship requires a minimum of six-years postgraduate training. This includes a two- or three-year surgical residency with an approved centre. Podiatric surgeons acquire comprehensive knowledge of related subjects including pharmacology, regional anaesthetic techniques and radiographic interpretation, as well as in-depth knowledge of foot surgery. The Surgical Faculty of the College of Podiatrists has set the standards for fellowship.

In 2019, a 23% drop in podiatry students in the UK was reported. The Conference of Postgraduate Medical Deans called for full payment of their tuition fees and the introduction of a maintenance grant for healthcare students.
