= Podiatry =

Medicine branch focusing on the human lower extremities

Podiatrist, podiatric surgeon, podiatric physician
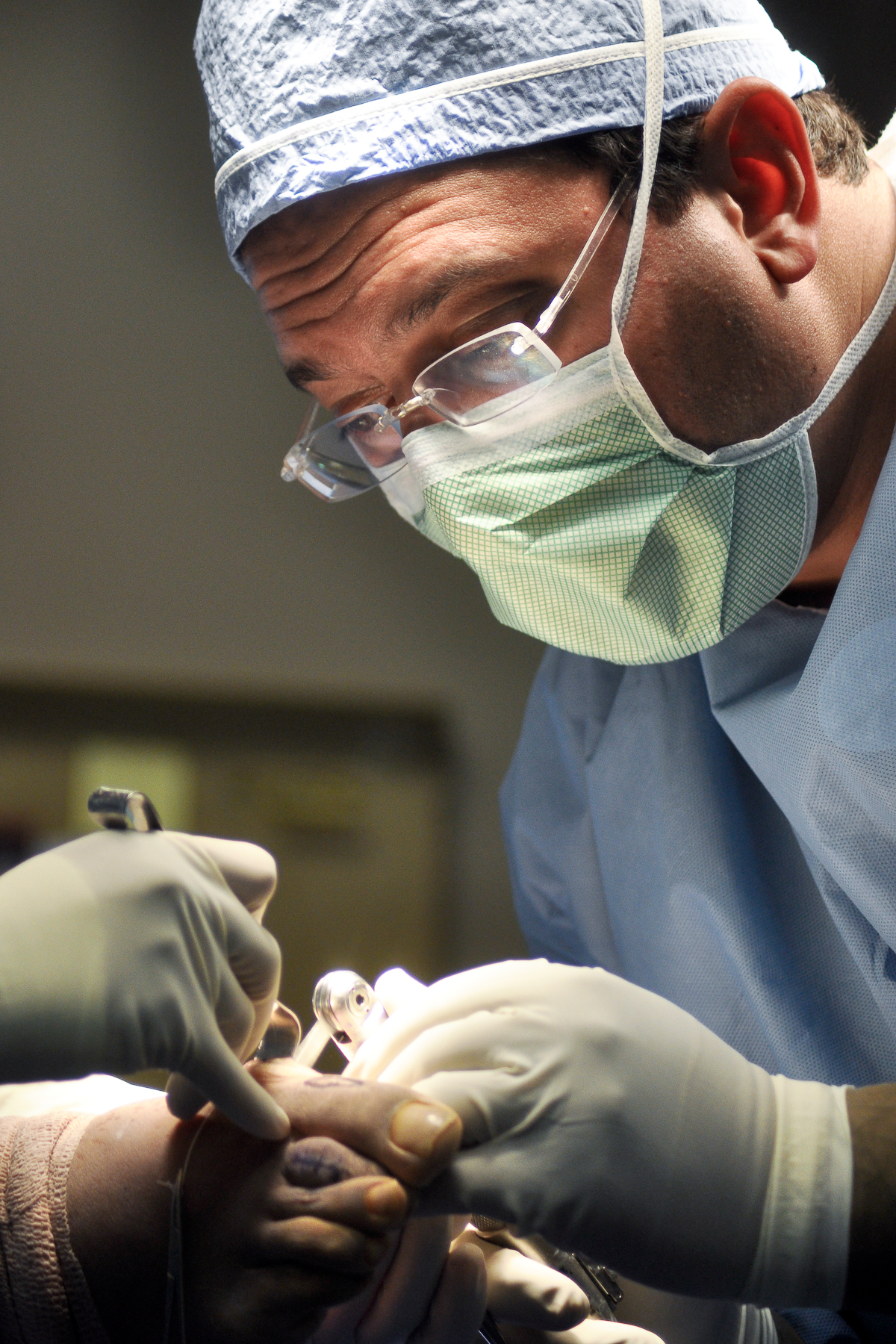
- Podiatric surgeon performing reconstructive surgery

Occupation
- Names: Podiatrist; Podiatric surgeon; Foot and ankle surgeon; Doctor of podiatric medicine; Podiatric physician
- Activity sectors: Medicine, sports medicine, orthopedics, plastic surgery, endocrinology, orthopedic surgery, dermatology, radiology, biomechanics, rheumatology, neurology

Description
- Competencies: Expertise in medicine, surgical skills, ethics, critical thinking, analytical skills, professionalism, management skills, and communication skills
- Education required: Doctor of Podiatric Medicine
- Fields of employment: Hospitals, private practices

Podiatry (/poʊˈdaɪ.ətri/ poh-DY-ə-tree), also known as podiatric medicine and surgery (/ˌpoʊdiˈætrɪk, poʊˈdaɪ.ətrɪk/ POH-dee-AT-rik, poh-DY-ə-trik), is a branch of medicine devoted to the study, diagnosis, and treatment of disorders of the foot, ankle and lower limb. The healthcare professional is known as a podiatrist.

The US podiatric medical school curriculum includes lower extremity anatomy, general human anatomy, physiology, general medicine, physical assessment, biochemistry, neurobiology, pathophysiology, genetics and embryology, microbiology, histology, pharmacology, women's health, physical rehabilitation, sports medicine, research, ethics and jurisprudence, biomechanics, general principles of orthopedic surgery, plastic surgery, and foot and ankle surgery.

Podiatry is practiced as a specialty in many countries. In Australia, graduates of recognised academic programs can register through the Podiatry Board of Australia as a "podiatrist", and those with additional recognised training may also receive endorsement to prescribe or administer restricted medications and/or seek specialist registration as a "podiatric surgeon". In some jurisdictions, "chiropodist" is an equivalent or lesser certification.

== History ==
The professional care of feet existed in ancient Egypt, as depicted by bas-relief carvings at the entrance to Ankmahor's tomb from about 2400 BC.

Until the turn of the 20th century, podiatrists were independently licensed physicians, separate from the rest of organized medicine. Lewis Durlacher, appointed as surgeon-podiatrist to the British royal household in 1823, called for podiatry to be a protected profession.

Prominent figures including Napoleon and French kings employed personal podiatrists. President Abraham Lincoln sent his personal podiatrist, Isachar Zachrie, on confidential missions to confer with leaders of the Confederacy during the U.S. Civil War.

The first podiatric society was established in New York in 1895, and still operates there today as NYSPMA. The first podiatric school opened in 1911. One year later, the British established a podiatric society at the London Foot Hospital; a school was added in 1919. The first American podiatric journal appeared in 1907, followed in 1912 by a UK journal. In Australia, professional podiatric associations were organized as early as 1924, followed by a podiatric training center and professional podiatric journal in 1939.

== Specific country practices ==
=== Australia ===
In Australia, podiatry is considered an allied health profession and is practised by individuals licensed by the Podiatry Board of Australia.

Australia recognizes two levels of professional accreditation (General Podiatrist and Podiatric Surgeon), with ongoing lobbying for the recognition of other subspecialties. Some Commonwealth countries recognize Australian qualifications, allowing Australian podiatrists to practise abroad.

==== Registration and regulation ====
Australian podiatrists must register with the Podiatry Board of Australia, which regulates podiatrists and podiatric surgeons. The board also assesses foreign-trained registrants in conjunction with the Australian & New Zealand Podiatry Accreditation Council (ANZPAC). It recognizes three pathways to attain specialist registration as a podiatric surgeon:

1. Fellowship of the Australasian College of Podiatric Surgeons
2. Doctor of Podiatric Surgery, University of Western Australia
3. Eligibility for Fellowship of the Australasian College of Podiatric Surgeons

Until 21 November 2019, ANZPAC approved the Doctor of Podiatric Surgery program of study offered by the University of Western Australia as providing a qualification for the purpose of specialist registration as a podiatric surgeon.

==== Education and training ====
To enter an undergraduate Podiatric Medicine program, applicants must have completed a Year 12 Certificate with an Australian Tertiary Admission Rank (ATAR). Cut-off scores from the Universities Admissions Centre (UAC) generally range from 70.00 to 95.00; prospective students who are 21 or older can instead apply directly to the university. The UWA DPM program has admission requirements of: completion of a UWA bachelor's degree or equivalent, a minimum GPA of 5.0 from the most recent three years (FTE) of valid study, suitable GAMSAT score, and English language competency. There is no interview requirement for the DPM at UWA (applications are handled via the university).

Australian podiatrists complete an undergraduate degree ranging from 3 to 4 years of education. The first 2 years of this program are generally focused on various biomedical science subjects, including functional anatomy, microbiology, biochemistry, physiology, pathophysiology, pharmacology, evidence-based medicine, sociology, and patient psychology, similar to the medical curriculum. The following year focuses on podiatry-specific areas such as podiatric anatomy & biomechanics, human gait, podiatric orthopaedics (the non-surgical management of foot abnormalities), podopaediatrics, sports medicine, rheumatology, diabetes, vascular medicine, mental health, wound care, neuroscience & neurology, pharmacology, general medicine, general pathology, local and general anaesthesia, minor and major podiatric surgical procedural techniques such as partial and total nail avulsions, matricectomy, cryotherapy, wound debridement, enucleation, suturing, other cutaneous and electro-surgical procedures and theoretical understanding of procedures performed by orthopaedic and podiatric surgeons.

Australian podiatric surgeons are specialist podiatrists with further advanced training in medicine and pharmacology, and training in foot surgery. Podiatrists wishing to pursue specialisation in podiatric surgery must meet the requirements for Fellowship with the Australasian College of Podiatric Surgeons. They must complete a 4-year degree, including 2 years of didactic study and 2 years of clinical experience, followed by a master's degree with a focus on biomechanics, medicine, surgery, general surgery, advanced pharmacology, advanced medical imaging, and clinical pathology. They then qualify for the status of Registrar with the Australasian College of Podiatric Surgeons. Following surgical training with a podiatric surgeon (3–5 years), rotations within other medical and surgeons' disciplines, overseas clinical rotations, and passing oral and written exams, Registrars may qualify for Fellowship status. Fellows are then given Commonwealth accreditation under the Health Insurance Act, recognising them as providers of professional attention for the purposes of health insurance rebates.

==== Australian podiatric medical schools ====
The following podiatric teaching centres are accredited by the Australian and New Zealand Podiatry Accreditation Council (ANZPAC):

- University of Western Australia
- Charles Sturt University
- La Trobe University
- University of Western Sydney
- University of South Australia
- University of Newcastle (Australia)
- Queensland University of Technology
- Central Queensland University
- Southern Cross University
- Auckland University of Technology (in New Zealand)

Some, including Charles Sturt University and University of Western Sydney, offer the degree Bachelor of Podiatric Medicine; others offer postgraduate degrees, such as the University of Western Australia's Doctor of Podiatric Medicine, and La Trobe University's Master of Podiatric Practice.

Two more podiatric schools are being developed, at the Australian Catholic University and the University of Ballarat.

==== Prescribing of scheduled medicines and referral rights ====
The prescribing rights of Australian podiatrists vary by state. All states allow registered podiatrists to use local anaesthesia for minor surgeries.

In Victoria, Western Australia, Queensland, South Australia, New South Wales: registered podiatrists and podiatric surgeons with an endorsement of scheduled medicines may prescribe relevant schedule 4 poisons.

In Western Australia and South Australia, podiatrists with Master's degrees in Podiatry and extensive training in pharmacology are authorised to prescribe Schedule 2, 3, 4, or 8 medicines (Australian Health Practitioner Regulation Agency).

In Queensland, Fellows of the Australasian College of Podiatric Surgeons are authorised to prescribe a range of Schedule 4 drugs and one Schedule 8 drug.

Prescriptions written by podiatrists do not qualify for the Pharmaceutical Benefits Scheme, despite lobbying to change this.

Some referrals from podiatrists (plain x-rays of the foot, leg, knee, and femur, and ultrasound examination of soft tissue conditions of the foot) are rebated by Medicare, while others (CTs, MRIs, bone scans, pathology testing, and other specialist medical practitioners) are not eligible for Medicare rebates.

=== Canada ===
In Canada, the definition and scope of the practice of podiatry varies by province. A number of provinces, including British Columbia, Alberta, and Quebec, accept the qualification of Doctor of Podiatric Medicine (DPM); in Quebec, other academic designations may also register.

In 2004, Université du Québec à Trois-Rivières started the first and only program of Podiatric Medicine in Canada based on the American definition of podiatry. This program enlists 25 students yearly across Canada and leads to a DPM upon obtaining 195 credits.

The province of Ontario has been registering chiropodists since 1944, with 701 chiropodists and 54 podiatrists registered by the College of Chiropodists of Ontario as of 31 December 2019. Ontario makes a distinction between podiatrists and chiropodists. Podiatrists are required to have a DPM, whereas chiropodists need to obtain a 3-year graduate diploma in chiropody offered by Michener Institute of Education at University health Network. Podiatrists, unlike chiropodists, may bill OHIP, "communicate a diagnosis" to their patients, and perform surgical procedures on the bones of the forefoot. Registered podiatrists who relocate to Ontario are required to register with the province and practice as a chiropodist. Ontario legislation in 1991 imposed a cap on Ontario-trained chiropodists becoming podiatrists, while grandfathering in already-practising podiatrists.

=== Iran ===
There are no podiatric medical schools in Iran. The Ministry of Health and Medical Education (MoHME) reviews the dossier of podiatric applicants for medical registration according to the "Regulations on the Evaluation of the Educational Credentials of Foreign Graduates".

Applicants with podiatric degrees from the United States qualify for registration in Iran if they meet the following criteria:

- possession of a bachelor's degree
- passing score on the MCAT
- completion of the podiatric curriculum of an accredited school, thereby obtaining the degree of Doctor of Podiatric Medicine (DPM)
- completion of a one-year postgraduate training (if required by the home jurisdiction)
- passing score on relevant board examinations

=== New Zealand ===
New Zealand established Chiropody (shortly thereafter renamed to Podiatry) as a registered profession in 1969, requiring all applicants to take a recognized three-year course of training. The New Zealand School of Podiatry was established at Petone in 1970, under the direction of John Gallocher. Later, the school moved to the Central Institute of Technology, Upper Hutt, Wellington. Today, Auckland University of Technology is the only provider of podiatry training in New Zealand.

In 1976, podiatrists in New Zealand gained the legal right to use a local anaesthetic, and began to include minor surgical procedures on ingrown toenails in their scope of practice. They received the right to refer patients to radiologists for X-rays in 1984, and (with suitable training) to acquire licensing to take their own X-rays in 1989. Diagnostic radiographic training is now incorporated into the podiatric degree syllabus, and on successful completion of the course, graduates register with the New Zealand National Radiation Laboratory.

=== United Kingdom ===
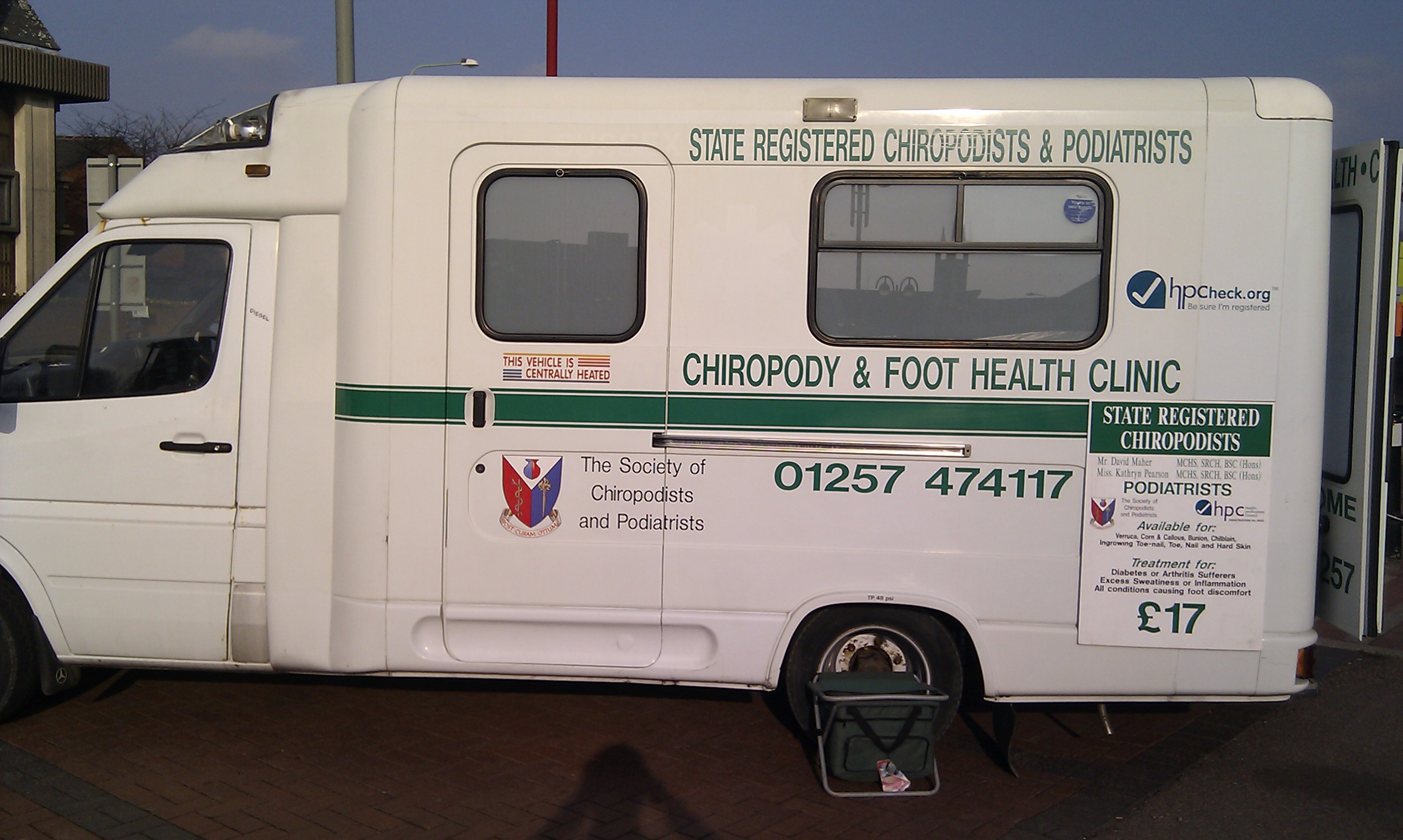
Mobile chiropodist in Chorley 2011

The scope of practice of podiatrists in the UK varies depending on their education and training, but may include simple skin care, the use of prescription-only medicines, injection therapy, and non-invasive surgery such as nail resection and removal. Podiatrists also interface between patients and multidisciplinary teams, recognising systemic disease as it manifests in the foot and referring on to the appropriate health care professionals.

To qualify as a podiatric surgeon, a podiatrist in the UK must undertake extensive postgraduate education and training, usually taking a minimum of 10 years to complete. Appropriately qualified podiatric surgeons may perform invasive bone and joint surgery.

Legislation in the UK protects the professional titles 'chiropodist' and 'podiatrist', but does not distinguish between the two. Those using protected titles must be registered with the Health and Care Professions Council (HCPC). Registration is normally only granted to those holding a bachelor's degree from one of 13 recognized schools of podiatry in the UK. Professional bodies recognised by the HCPC are:

- The Society of Chiropodists and Podiatrists
- The Alliance of Private Sector Practitioners
- The Institute of Chiropodists and Podiatrists
- The British Chiropody and Podiatry Association

In 1979, the Royal Commission on the National Health Service reported that about six and a half million NHS chiropody treatments were provided to just over one and a half million people in Great Britain in 1977, an increase of 19% over the number from three years before. Over 90% of patients receiving these treatments were aged 65 or over. At that time there were about 5,000 state registered chiropodists, but only about two-thirds worked for the NHS. The Commission agreed with the suggestion of the Association of Chief Chiropody Officers that more foot hygienists should be introduced, who could undertake, under the direction of a registered chiropodist, "nail cutting and such simple foot-care and hygiene as a fit person should normally carry out for himself."

=== United States ===
In the United States, medical and surgical care of the foot and ankle is mainly provided by two groups: podiatrists (with a Doctor of Podiatric Medicine degree) and orthopedic surgeons (with a Doctor of Medicine or Doctor of Osteopathic Medicine degree). In most states, the scope of a podiatrist's practice is limited to the foot and ankle; however, some states include the leg, hand, or both. As of 2025, 9,700 podiatrists work in the United States.

In order to be considered for admission to podiatric medical school, an applicant must first complete a minimum of 90 semester hours at the university level, or (more commonly), complete a bachelor's degree with an appropriate emphasis. In addition, potential students are required to take the Medical College Admission Test (MCAT). In 2019, the average MCAT for matriculants was 500.

The DPM degree itself takes a minimum of four years to complete. The first two years of podiatric medical school are similar to training that M.D. and D.O. students receive, but with greater emphasis on the foot and ankle.

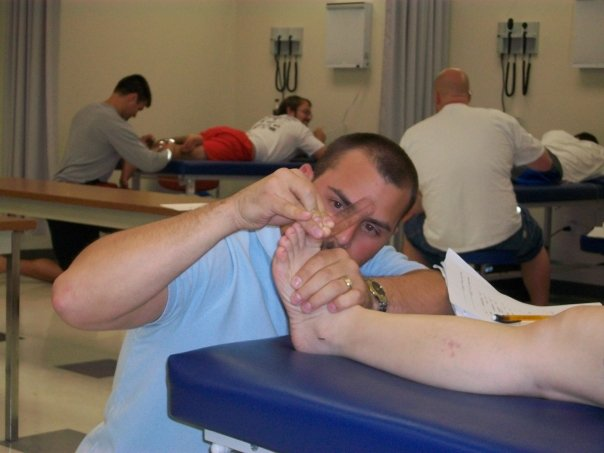
A podiatry student examines the extension angle of the first metatarsal phalangeal joint (MTPJ).

The four-year podiatric medical school is followed by a surgical residency to provide hands-on training. As of July 2013, all residency programs in podiatry were required to transition to a minimum of three years of post-doctoral training. This upgrading of training was spearheaded in California by the state Board of Podiatric Medicine (BPM) and its California Liaison Committee (CLC). BPM’s Executive Officer James H. Rathlesberger included it in the Federation of Podiatric Medical Boards’ Model Law, which he wrote before becoming FPMB president in 2000.

Podiatric residents rotate through core areas of medicine and surgery. They work in such rotations as emergency medicine, internal medicine, infectious disease, behavioral medicine, physical medicine and rehabilitation, vascular surgery, general surgery, orthopedic surgery, plastic surgery, dermatology, and podiatric surgery and medicine. Fellowship training is available after residency in such fields such as geriatrics, foot and ankle traumatology, and infectious disease.

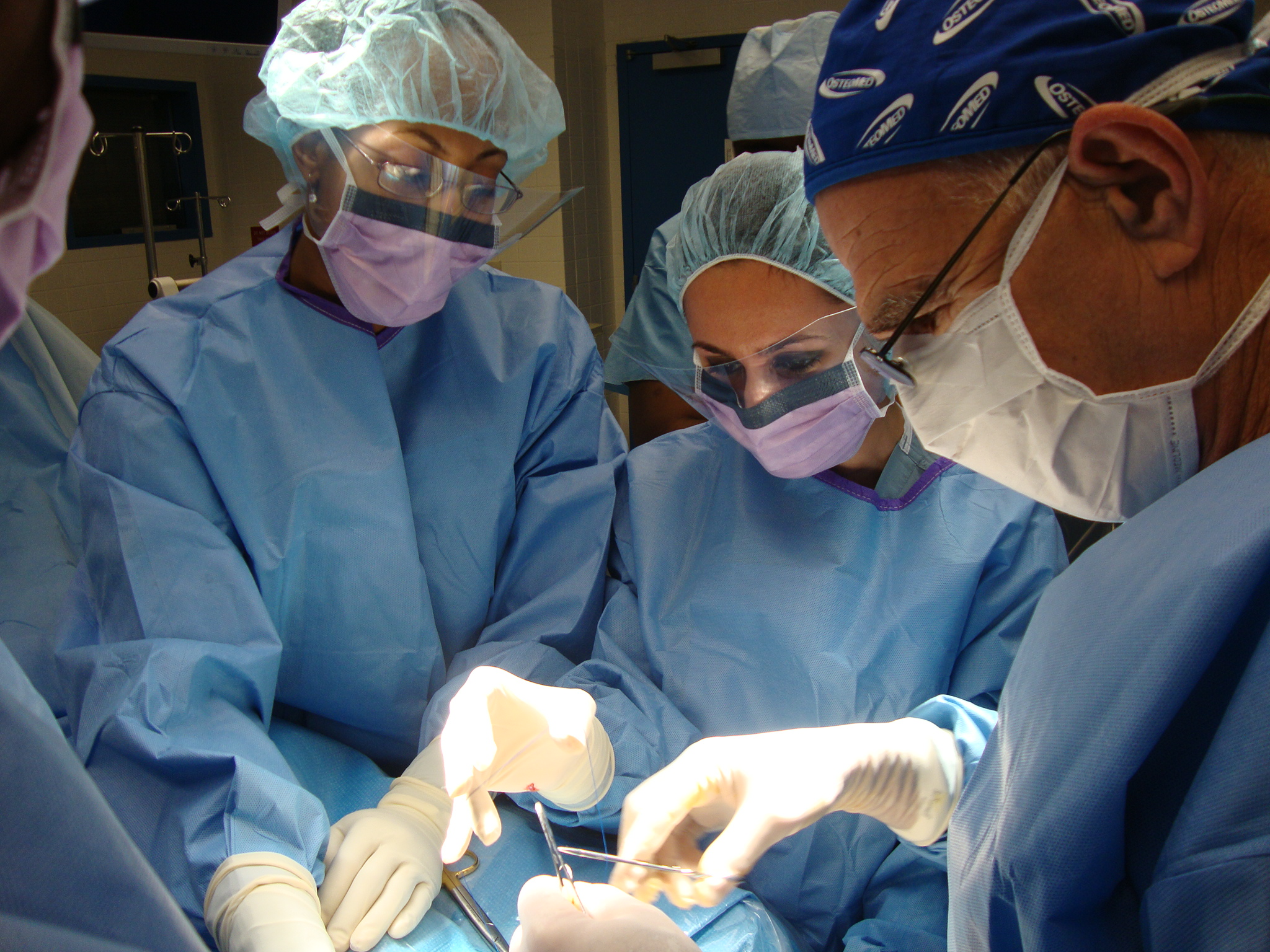
Podiatric Surgical Training

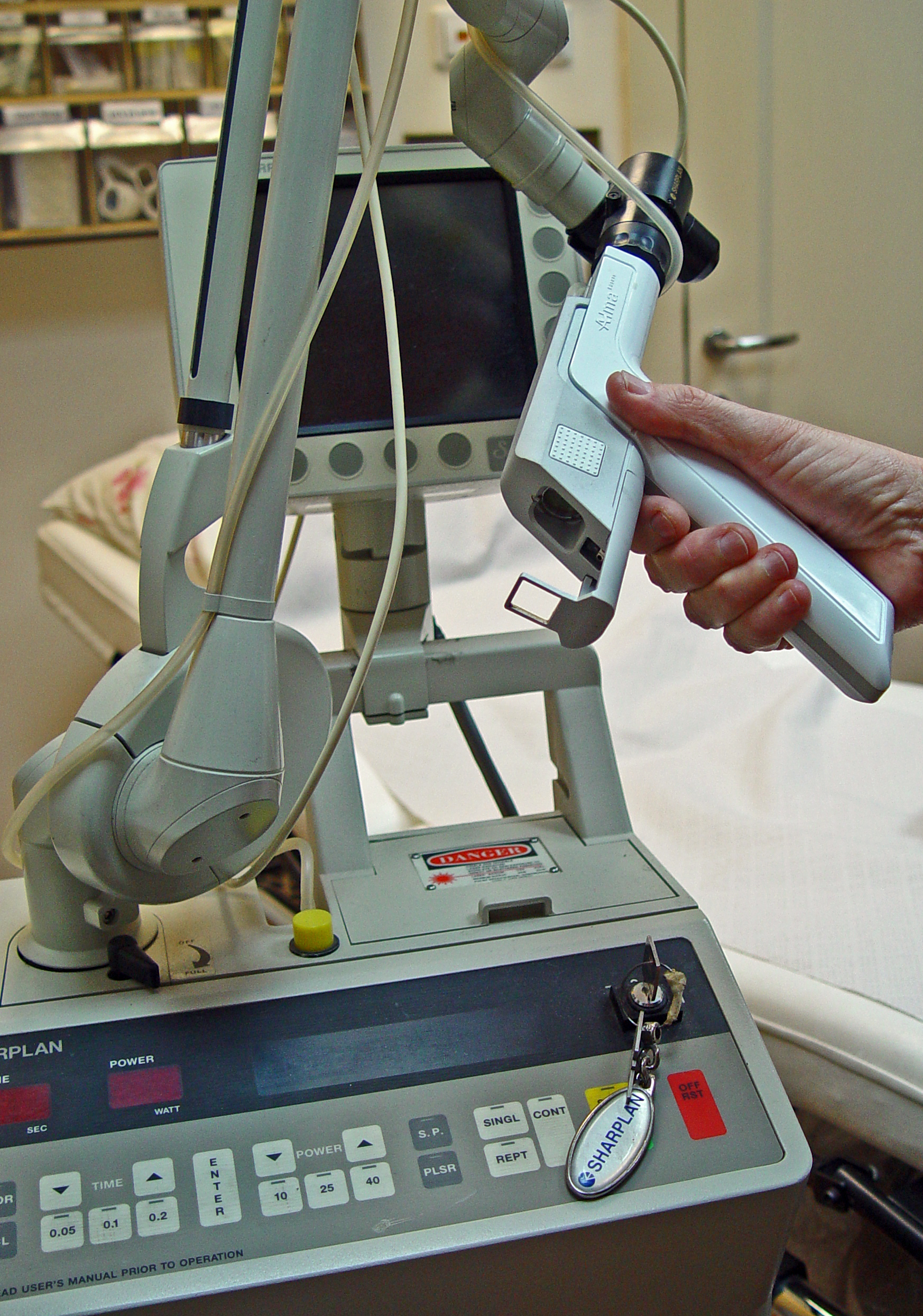
A 40 watt CO_{2} laser used for podiatry

Upon completion of their residency, podiatrist candidates are eligible to sit for examinations for certification by one of two specialty boards accredited by the Council on Podiatric Medical Education (CPME), which itself is overseen and approved by the Department of Education. These are the American Board of Podiatric Medicine (ABPM) and the American Board of Foot and Ankle Surgery (ABFAS).

ABPM certification leads to fellowship in either the American Society of Podiatric Surgeons (ASPS) or the American College of Podiatric Medicine (ACPM). ABFAS certification leads to fellowship in the ASPS or the American College of Foot and Ankle Surgeons (ACFAS). ABPM is recognized by CPME as certification in primary podiatric medicine and orthopaedics and the ABFAS as certification in podiatric surgery. However, hospital credentialing committees often do not distinguish between the two.

There are two surgical certifications under ABFAS: foot surgery, and reconstructive rearfoot/ankle (RRA) surgery. In order to be board-certified in RRA, the sitting candidate has to have already achieved board certification in foot surgery. To receive ABFAS certification, the candidate must pass the written examination, submit surgical logs indicating experience and variety, pass an oral examination, and complete a computer-based clinical simulation.

The U.S. Bureau of Labor Statistics reported a median annual wage of $152,800 for podiatrists in 2024."Podiatrists: Occupational Outlook Handbook". U.S. Bureau of Labor Statistics. Profession-specific compensation surveys have reported higher figures; the 2025 APMA and Marit Health Podiatry Compensation Report listed median compensation of approximately $230,000 for podiatry and $323,000 for podiatry—foot and ankle surgery.2025 Podiatry Compensation Report (Report). American Podiatric Medical Association and Marit Health. 2025.

==== Practice characteristics ====
Podiatric physicians practice in a variety of different settings. Some practice solo in a private practice setting; some belong to larger group practices. There are podiatrists in larger multi-specialty practices as well (such as orthopedic groups or groups for the treatment of diabetes) or clinic practices (such as the Indian Health Service (IHS), the Rural Health Centers (RHC), or the Community Health Center (FQHC)). Some work for government organizations, such as for Veterans Affairs hospitals and clinics.

Some podiatrists have primarily surgical practices. They may complete additional fellowship training in reconstruction of the foot and ankle from the effects of diabetes or physical trauma, or practice minimally invasive percutaneous surgery for cosmetic correction of hammer toes and bunions.

Podiatrists treat a wide variety of foot and lower-extremity conditions through both nonsurgical and surgical approaches. While the terminology of subspecialties differ around the world, they generally fall into these categories:

- Reconstructive foot and ankle surgery
- Podiatric sports medicine (chronic overuse injuries and mechanical performance enhancement)
- Podiatric dermatology
- Lower extremity plastic and reconstructive surgery, limb salvage, and wound care
- Podopediatrics (podiatry in children)
- Forensic podiatry (the study of footprints, footwear, shoeprints and feet associated with crime scene investigations)

==== Colleges and education ====
There are 11 schools of podiatric medicine in the United States. These are governed by the American Association of Colleges of Podiatric Medicine (AACPM) and accredited by the Council on Podiatric Medical Education.

==== Podiatric assistants ====
Podiatric assistants work as a part of a podiatric medical team in a variety of clinical and non-clinical settings. Worldwide, there are common professional accreditation pathways to be a podiatric assistant; for instance, in Australia, the qualification is a Certificate IV in Allied Health Assistance specialising in podiatry. Podiatric assistants may specialize in many different fields, such as:

- Podiatric nurse
- Podiatric surgical nurse
- Foot carer
- Podiatric support worker
- Podiatric technician
- Podiatric hygienist
- Foot hygienist
- Podiatric medical assistant

== Professional societies and organizations ==
- Academy of Ambulatory Foot and Ankle Surgery (AAFAS)
- Alberta Podiatry Association (APA)
- Alpha Gamma Kappa fraternity
- Alliance of Private Sector Practitioners
- American Podiatric Medical Association (APMA)
- American Society of Podiatric Surgeons (ASPS)
- American Society of Forensic Podiatry
- American College of Foot and Ankle Surgeons (ACFAS)
- American Board of Foot and Ankle Surgery (ABFAS)
- American College of Podiatric Medicine (ACPM)
- American Board of Podiatric Medicine (ABPM
- American Board of Multiple Specialties in Podiatric Medicine
- American Board of Multiple Specialties in Podiatric Surgery
- American Academy of Podiatric Sports Medicine (AAPSM)
- American Society of Podiatric Dermatology (ASPD)
- American Podiatric Medical Students' Association (APMSA)
- Australian College of Podiatric Surgeons (ACPS)
- Australian Podiatry Association (APodA)
- Australian Podiatry Council (APodC)
- Australasian Academy of Podiatric Sports Medicine (AAPSM)
- Australasian Podiatric Rheumatology Specialist Interest Group (APRSIG)
- Association Belge des Podologues
- Canadian Federation of Podiatric Medicine
- Canadian Podiatric Medical Association (CPMA)
- American Academy of Podiatric Practice Management (AAPPM)
- International Federation of Podiatrists – Fédération Internationale des Podologues (FIP-IFP)
- International Foot and Ankle Biomechanics Community (i-FAB)
- Student National Podiatric Medical Association (SNPMA)
- Federation of Podiatric Medical Boards (FPMB)
- Institute of Chiropodists and Podiatrists (IOCP)
- Royal College of Podiatry (RCoP)
