= Joseph Lewi =

American physician

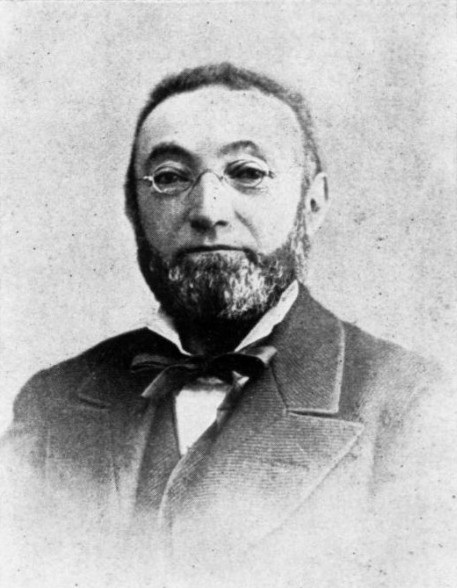
Dr. Joseph Lewi

Joseph Lewi (August 17, 1820 – December 19, 1897) was an American physician of Czech Jewish extraction.

== Biography ==
Lewi was born on August 17, 1820, in Radnice and educated at the universities of Prague and Vienna. After graduating from the latter university (MD 1846), he was appointed assistant at the Vienna Lying-in Hospital. In 1847, he began to practice in Radnice. Lewi's first patient was the daughter of Isaac Mayer Wise, who was to become the first rabbi in Albany, New York, and the most notable American Jewish leader of the 19th century.

In 1948, at Wise's suggestion, he emigrated to America, settling in Albany, where his family shared a house with the Wise family. Lewi became one of the first Jewish professionals in Albany and the first Jewish physician in Albany. There he was appointed on the staff of the Albany hospital, and became a member and later president of the Albany County Medical Society, and senior censor of the State Medical Society. During the American Civil War, he sat on the state board that evaluated potential military surgeons. Lewi was one of the forty-two citizens of Albany who organized, in 1863, the Union League in that city.

Joseph Lewi died at his home in Albany, New York on December 19, 1897.

== Personal ==
In 1849, Lewi married fellow Jewish immigrant Bertha Schwarz in New York City. Her father was Joseph Emanuel Schwarz, a cantor and noted composer of sacred music in Kassel, Germany. They had six sons and eight daughters.

Thirteen of Lewi's fourteen children survived him. Their oldest son was the journalist Isidor Lewi (1850–1939). He was educated at The Albany Academy, became connected with several newspapers, and was an editorial writer for the New York Tribune and publisher of The New Era Illustrated Magazine.

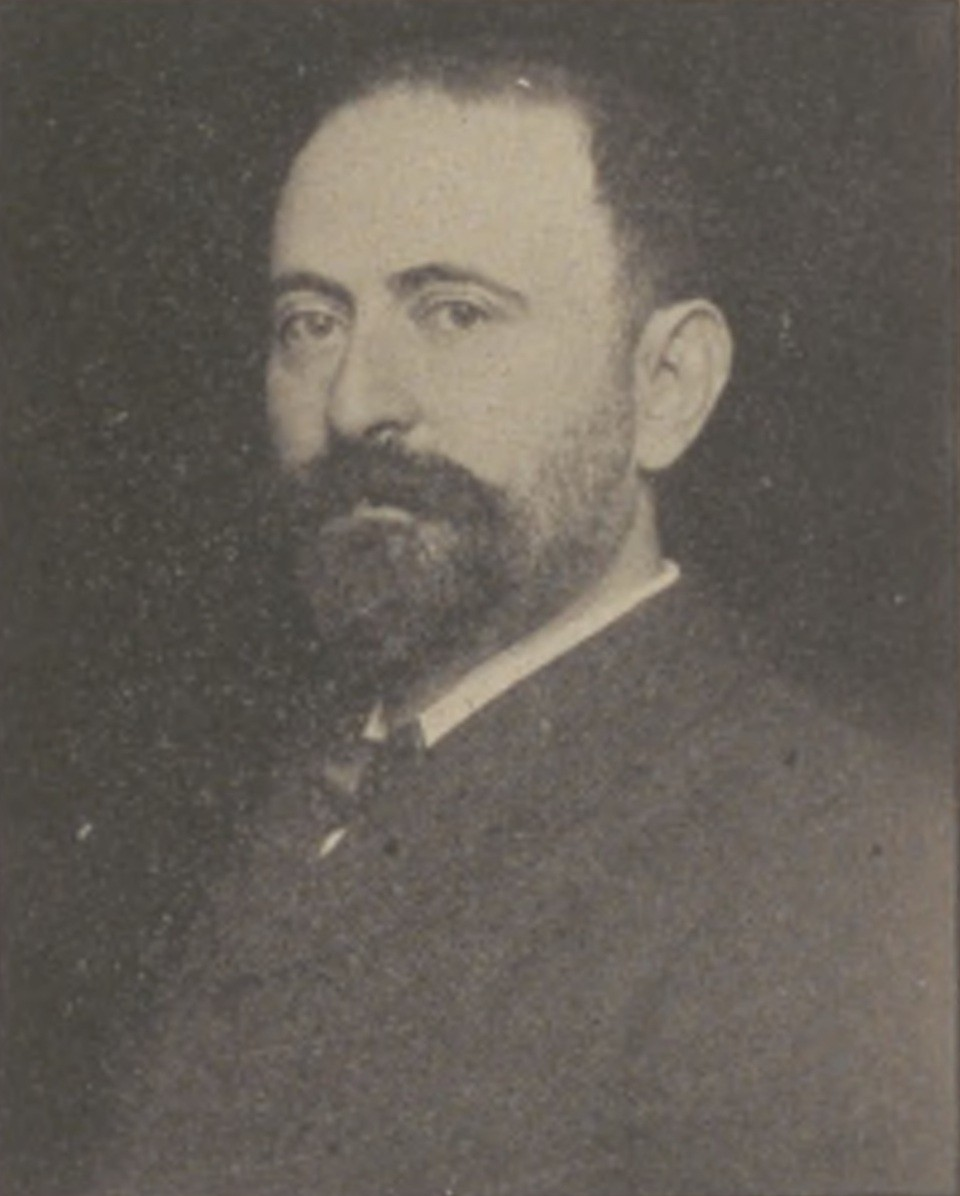
Dr. Maurice J. Lewi

Another son, Maurice J. Lewi (born December 1, 1857 in Albany; died May 27, 1957 in Manhattan), was a physician in New York City. He graduated from the Albany Medical College in 1877. After a postgraduate course in Heidelberg and Vienna he began to practice in Albany in 1880, became a lecturer at the Albany Medical College and professor of medical jurisprudence at the Albany Law School, and later became secretary of the state board of medical examiners. In 1912, he led the establishment of podiatry as a distinct medical specialty. In 1913, he became president of the new Institute of Podiatry.

Their youngest son, William G. Lewi, also became a physician. Their oldest daughter, Wilhelmine, married physician Herman Bendell. Herman and Wilhelmine's son, Joseph Lewi Bendell, also became a physician. Another of Joseph and Bertha's daughters, Martha Washington Lewi, married physician Alois Donhauser.
