= Temple Ohabei Shalom (Brookline, Massachusetts) =

Reform synagogue in Brookline, Massachusetts, US

- Hebrew: מקדש אוהבי שלום
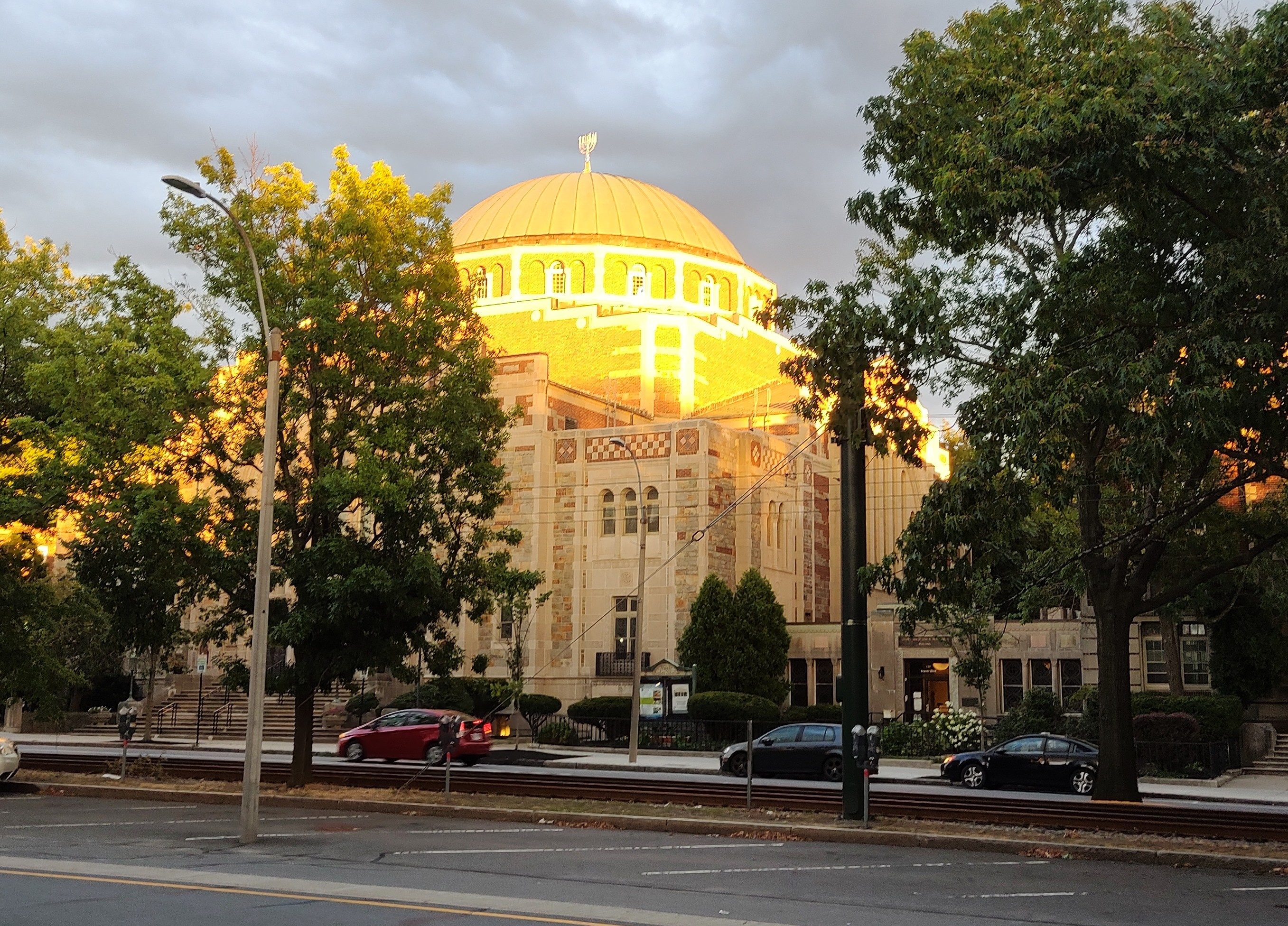
- Temple Ohabei Shalom in 2022

- Location in Boston, Massachusetts

Religion
- Affiliation: Reform Judaism
- Ecclesiastical or organizational status: Synagogue
- Leadership: Rabbi Audrey Berkman; Cantor Maayan Silverman (Assistant); Rabbi Emily Gopen Lipof (Emerita)
- Status: Active

Location
- Location: 1187 Beacon Street, Brookline, Boston, Massachusetts
- Country: United States
- Interactive map of Temple Ohabei Shalom
- Coordinates: 42°20′37″N 71°06′52″W

Architecture
- Architects: Clarence Blackall (Blackall, Clapp, and Whittemore)
- Type: Synagogue
- Style: Byzantine Revival
- Established: 1842 (as a congregation)
- Completed: 1851 (Warren Street); 1863 (Warrenton Street); 1887 (Union Park Street); 1927 (Beacon Street)

Specifications
- Capacity: 1,800 worshippers (Sanctuary); 300 worshippers (Chapel)
- Dome: One
- Materials: Masonry, copper, stone

Website
- ohabei.org

Temple Ohabei Shalom (Hebrew: מקדש אוהבי שלום) is a Reform Jewish synagogue located at 1187 Beacon Street, in Brookline, suburban Boston, Massachusetts, in the United States. Organized in 1842 with membership mainly of German Jews, it is the oldest Jewish congregation in Massachusetts and the third oldest in New England, following congregations in Newport and New Haven.

== History ==
The congregation's first act was to establish a cemetery, the Temple Ohabei Shalom Cemetery, located in East Boston, and listed on the National Register of Historic Places in 2008. The cemetery will soon be the home of the Jewish Cemetery Association of Massachusetts' museum commemorating the Mystic River Jews.

The first synagogue building, erected in 1851 on Warren Street, Boston, was a handsome, two-story wooden structure with a doorway flanked by a pair of windows on each side and balanced by three pairs of windows on the second floor. The windows, each set a pair with arched tops, resembled the standard representation of the tablets of the ten commandments. The sanctuary could seat 400 and had space for a Hebrew School, a meeting room, and a mikveh.

The congregation's second building, used from 1863–86, was a handsome Greek Revival structure at 76 Warrenton Street, Boston. It had been built as a Universalist church and is today the home of the Charles Playhouse. Raphael Lasker became rabbi of the congregation in 1876.

The third building was a former Unitarian Church building, located at 15 Union Park Street. The church was led by Edward Everett Hale, who spoke at the building's rededication as a synagogue in 1887. The building is now the St. John The Baptist Greek Orthodox Church.

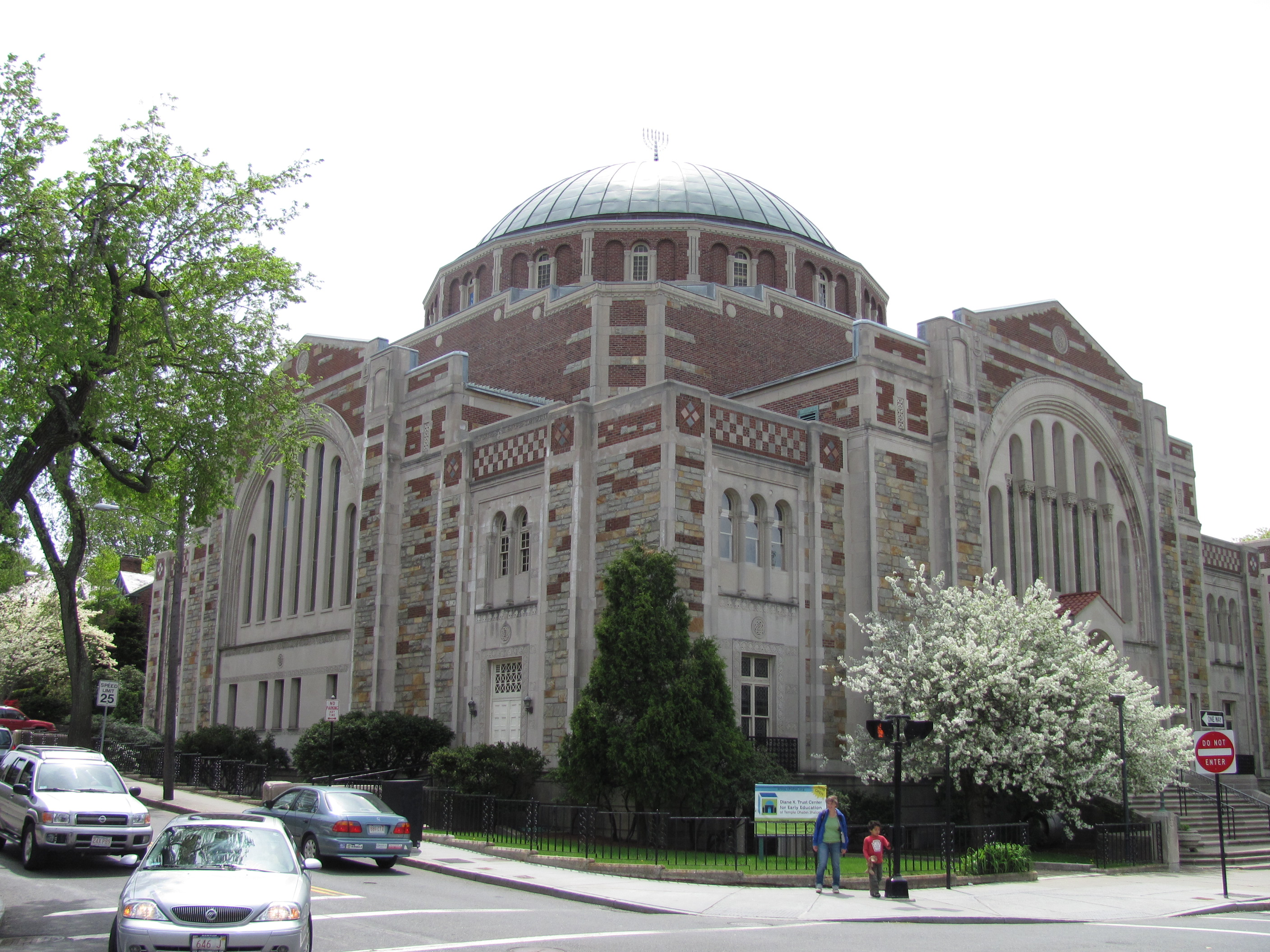
Temple Ohabei Shalom located in Brookline, Massachusetts circa 2011.

The congregation's present building, an opulent structure at 1187 Beacon Street in suburban Brookline, designed by Clarence Blackall in the Byzantine Revival style, was completed in 1927, with a school first developed on the site in 1925. The sanctuary seats 1,800 and the smaller chapel accommodates 300. The domed building was intended to have a tall minaret, according to the architect's renditions, although it was never built. The sanctuary was modeled on Hagia Sophia because of the excitement then felt over recent excavations of Byzantine-era synagogues in the land of Israel. The building includes a large school, an auditorium, a ballroom (that could be used as a gymnasium), a museum, a library, and a reading room.

Temple Israel was founded in 1854 when German Jews who disliked the influx of Polish Jews seceded from Ohabei Shalom. The congregations remain friendly and are working together on several projects related to outreach and the enhancement of the local Jewish community.

The Temple community celebrated its 180th anniversary in 2022.

Temple Ohabei Shalom is also home to the Diane K. Trust Center For Early Education and Ansin Religious School.

== See also ==
- History of the Jews in the United States
- Temple Ohabei Shalom Cemetery
