= Břasy =

- Municipality
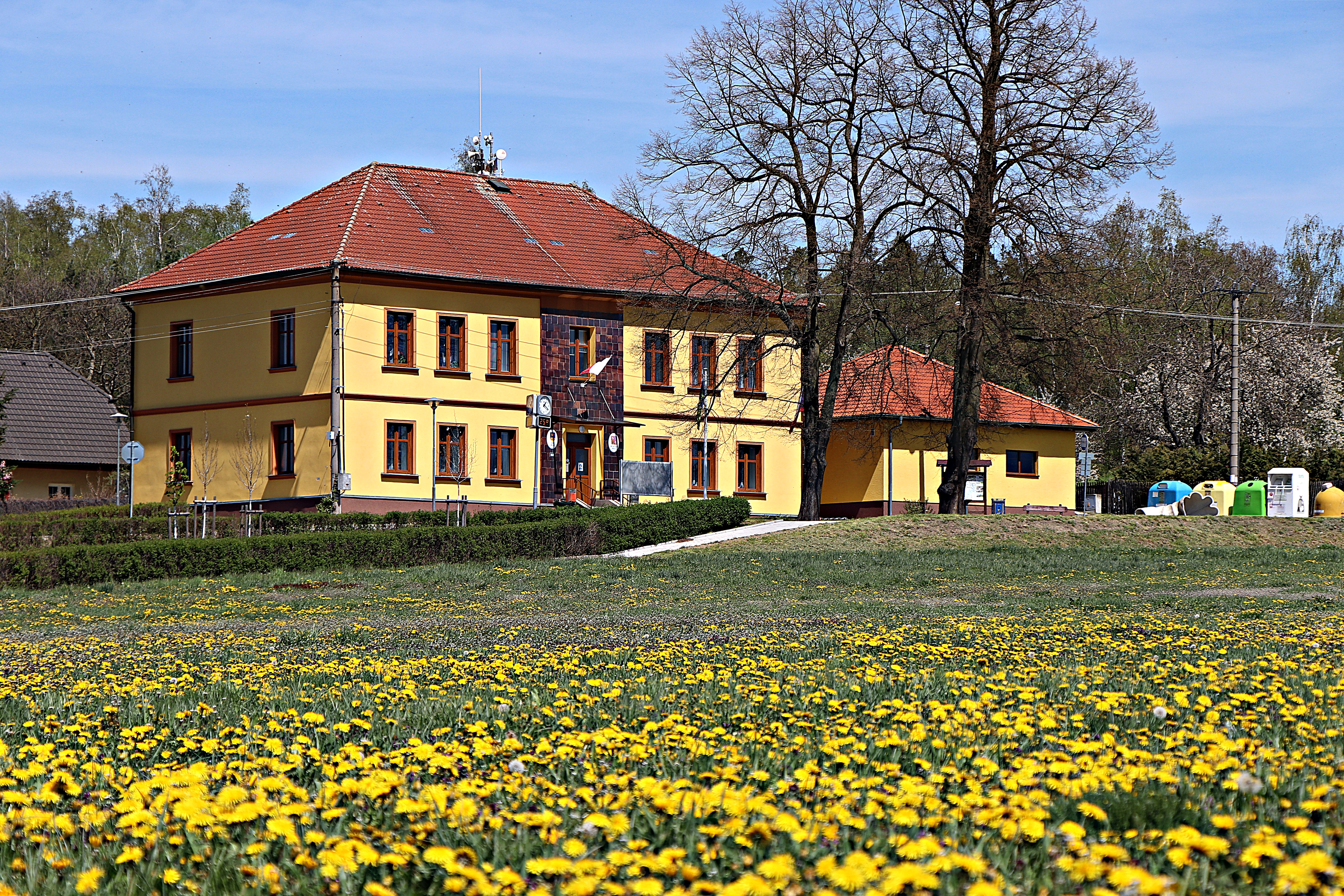
- Municipal office

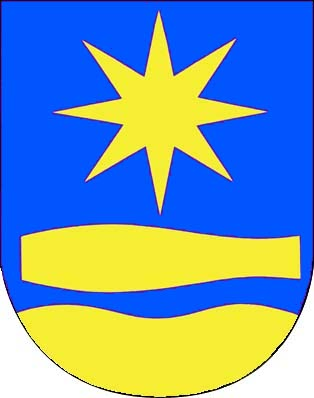
- Flag Coat of arms

- Location in the Czech Republic
- Coordinates: 49°50′10″N 13°35′5″E
- Country: Czech Republic
- Region: Plzeň
- District: Rokycany
- First mentioned: 1379

Area
  - Total: 21.44 km^{2} (8.28 sq mi)
- Elevation: 458 m (1,503 ft)

Population (2026-01-01)
  - Total: 2,314
  - Density: 107.9/km^{2} (279.5/sq mi)
- Time zone: UTC+1 (CET)
  - Summer (DST): UTC+2 (CEST)
- Postal code: 338 24
- Website: www.obecbrasy.cz

Břasy (German: Bschas) is a municipality and village in Rokycany District in the Plzeň Region of the Czech Republic. It has about 2,300 inhabitants.

== Administrative division ==
Břasy consists of five municipal parts (in brackets population according to the 2021 census):

- Břasy (1,129)
- Darová (27)
- Kříše (264)
- Stupno (699)
- Vranovice (166)

== Etymology ==
The name is derived from the Czech words vřasy, břasy (in standard Czech vřes), which are folk names for 'heather'.

== Geography ==
Břasy is located about 10 kilometres (6 mi) north of Rokycany and 15 km (9 mi) northeast of Plzeň. It lies in the Plasy Uplands in a largely deforested plateau, which falls sharply towards the valley of the Berounka River in the west. The highest point is the hill Přešov at 505 m (1,657 ft) above sea level.

The Berounka forms the western municipal border. The stream Dírecký potok flows across the municipality into the Berounka.

== History ==
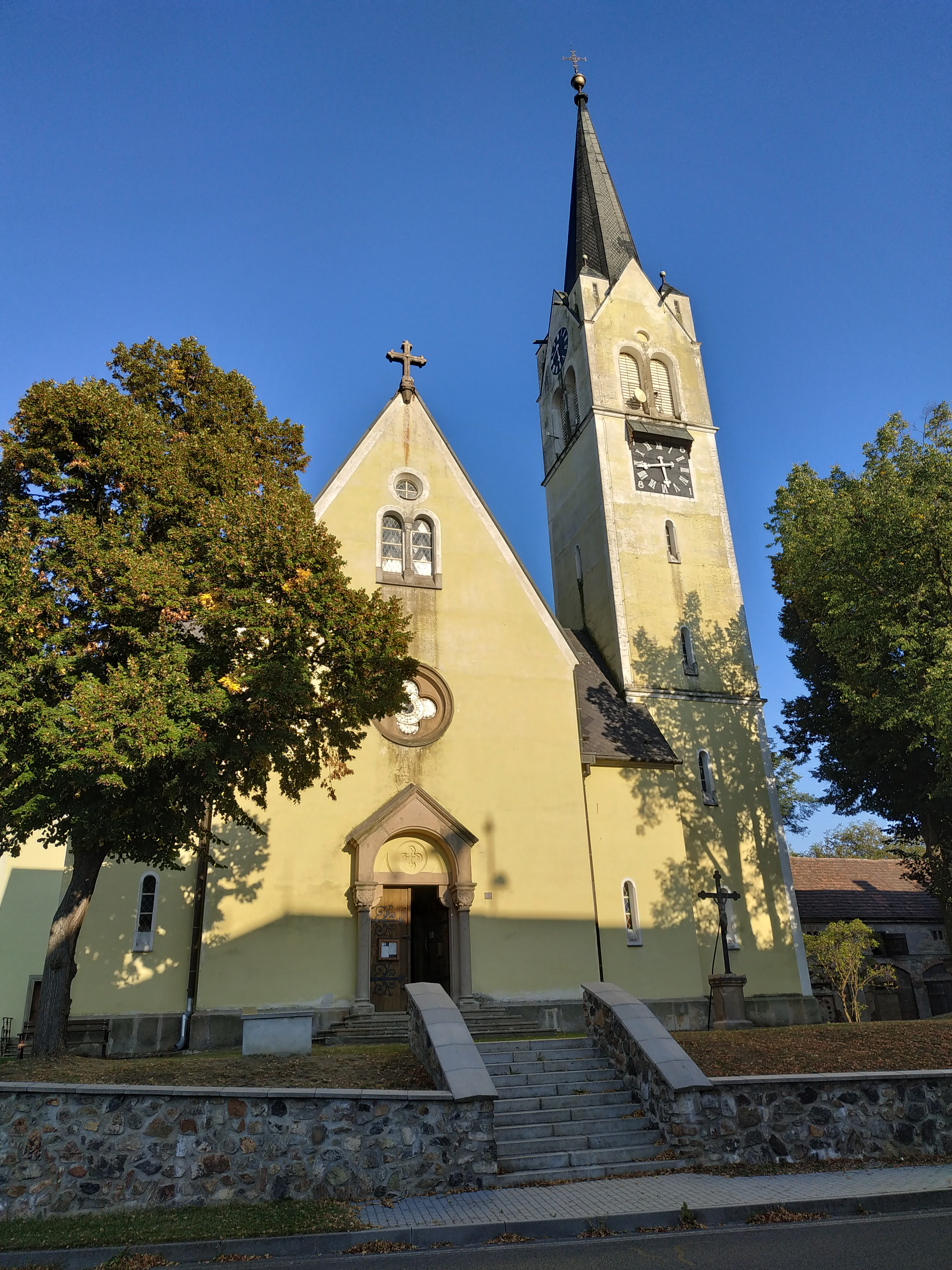
Church of Saint Lawrence in Stupno

The first written mention of Břasy is from 1379 under its previous name Vranov (German: Wranow). The village rapidly grew in the 19th century thanks to influx of workers into the coal mines. At the turn of the 20th century Vranov had population of 1,200. The name of Břasy originally applied only to small workers' colony which was annexed by Vranov in 1918. In 1960, five municipalities were united under the municipality of Břasy. In 1982, even Vranov proper was renamed Břasy.

The main impetus to industrial development was coal mining, area of Břasy became one of centres of Radnice coal basin. In 1893, the Stupno–Radnice stretch of the railway was built. Local network of railway sidings for coal transport evolved between Vranov and Stupno, from 1908 this siding was electrically powered. In 1953, it was abandoned, while the Chrást–Radnice railway operates until now. Mining activity resulted in population growth. Other industrial companies settled in Břasy too, such as glass plant in Vranov (until 1933, later converted to furniture factory, which closed in 1997), ceramics factory in Vranov, iron-foundry in Vranov, another ceramics factory later converted to chemical factory. In 1933 statue in memory of miners by leftist sculptor Emanuel Famíra was built in Vranov, only to be demolished by German authorities in 1941. In 1945, Břasy was liberated both by American and Soviet armies. Post-World War II development was also facilitated by Czechoslovak Army's presence in Břasy (ground radar station, after 1989 abandoned). In 1969, coal mining in Břasy stopped.

Stupno was mentioned for the first time in 1146. The village's name evolved from Stúpa to Stupná, and finally to Stupno. Stupno grew into major village and served as a population centre of the agglomeration for most of the 19th century. In 1900, Stupno had population of 1,283.

Vranovice (German: Wranowitz) was mentioned for the first time in 1115. Unlike Stupno and Břasy it did not enter the contiguous built-up agglomeration but it also underwent rapid population growth as a result of industrial development. In 1900, Vranovice had population of 775.

Kříše (German: Krisch) was mentioned for the first time in 1384. It also remains territorially distinct but the industrial development took place in the village proper and population growth occurred here too. With influx of workers the population reached more than 1,300 at its peak in 1890.

Darová (German: Darowa) was mentioned for the first time in 1235. The village is the most outlying part of Břasy. Located in the valley of the Berounka it never really lost its rural character despite some coal and iron ore mining. In 1900, the village's population was 145. Hydroelectric plant was built on the Berounka river at the beginning of the 20th century.

== Demographics ==
Historical population

Year	Pop.	±%
1869	4,098	—
1880	4,922	+20.1%
1890	5,275	+7.2%
1900	4,845	−8.2%
1910	4,359	−10.0%

Year	Pop.	±%
1921	3,996	−8.3%
1930	3,931	−1.6%
1950	3,224	−18.0%
1961	3,293	+2.1%
1970	2,802	−14.9%

Year	Pop.	±%
1980	2,600	−7.2%
1991	2,214	−14.8%
2001	2,033	−8.2%
2011	2,151	+5.8%
2021	2,285	+6.2%

Source: Censuses

== Transport ==
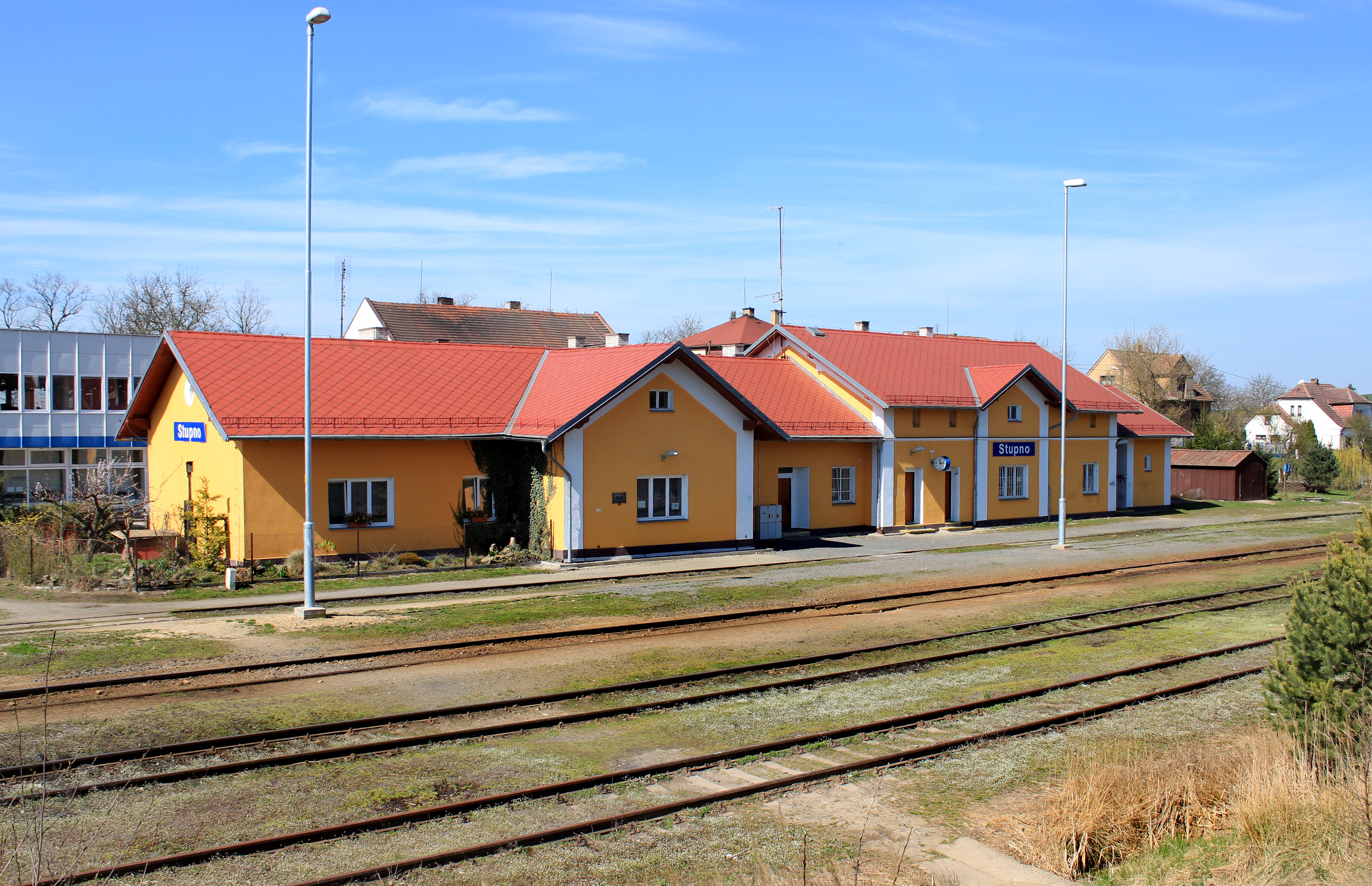
Stupno train station

Břasy is located on the railway line Radnice–Bezdružice via Plzeň. The municipality is served by three train stations and stops: Břasy, Stupno and Dolní Stupno.

== Sights ==
The village of Břasy is poor in monuments; the most valuable buildings are located in Stupno. The most important monument in Stupno is the Church of Saint Lawrence. It was built in the pseudo-Romanesque style in 1880–1882. It replaced an old church, which was first mentioned in 1352.

A cultural monument is the tomb of the Sternberg family in Stupno. It is an Empire building dating from 1827.
