= Chomle =

- Municipality
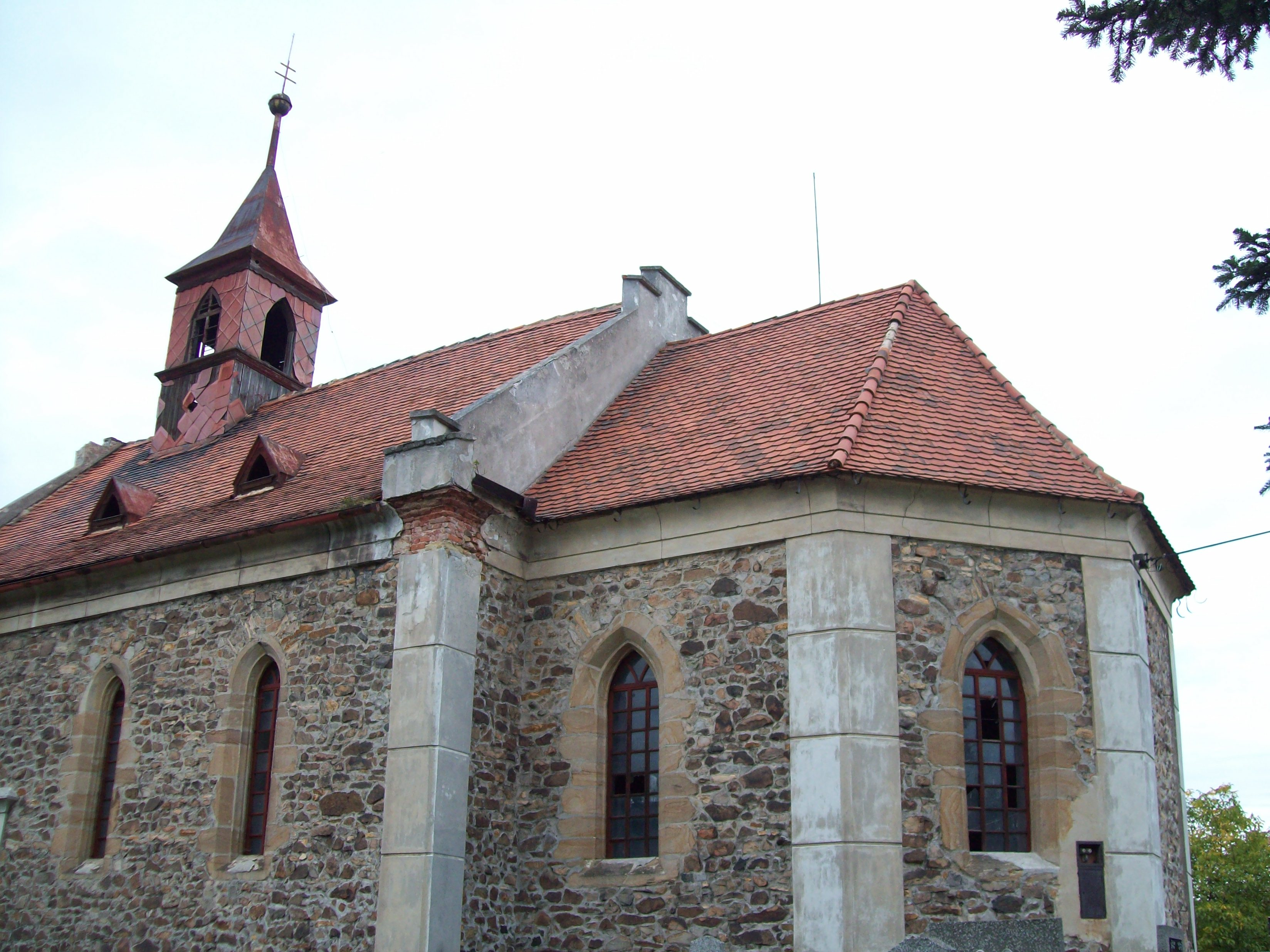
- Church of Saint Margaret

- Location in the Czech Republic
- Coordinates: 49°51′45″N 13°38′4″E
- Country: Czech Republic
- Region: Plzeň
- District: Rokycany
- First mentioned: 1352

Area
  - Total: 2.24 km^{2} (0.86 sq mi)
- Elevation: 452 m (1,483 ft)

Population (2026-01-01)
  - Total: 79
  - Density: 35/km^{2} (91/sq mi)
- Time zone: UTC+1 (CET)
  - Summer (DST): UTC+2 (CEST)
- Postal code: 338 28
- Website: www.chomle.cz

Chomle is a municipality and village in Rokycany District in the Plzeň Region of the Czech Republic. It has about 80 inhabitants.

Chomle lies approximately 14 kilometres (9 mi) north of Rokycany, 23 km (14 mi) north-east of Plzeň, and 62 km (39 mi) south-west of Prague.

== History ==
From 1960 to 1980, Chomle was part of Vejvanov. From 1 April 1980 to 23 November 1990, Chomle was a municipal part of Radnice.

== Demographics ==
Historical population
Year	Pop.	±%
1869	304	—
1880	304	+0.0%
1890	283	−6.9%
1900	265	−6.4%
1910	241	−9.1%
1921	245	+1.7%
1930	205	−16.3%
1950	174	−15.1%
1961	149	−14.4%
1970	113	−24.2%
1980	103	−8.8%
1991	82	−20.4%
2001	69	−15.9%
2011	66	−4.3%
2021	71	+7.6%
Source: Censuses
