= Radnice coal basin =

Coordinates: 49°50′56″N 13°35′19″E

Radnice coal basin was a relatively small area around Radnice and Břasy in the Rokycany District of the Czech Republic where coal depots existed and coal mining developed in the 19th century. During the 20th century the coal reserves were largely depleted and mining stopped in this region. The coal basin was said to be the only locality in Central Europe where bituminous coal was found so close to the surface that it could be retrieved by open pit mining.

== See also ==
- Energy in the Czech Republic
