= Herman Bendell =

American military physician and politician (b. 1843, d. 1932)

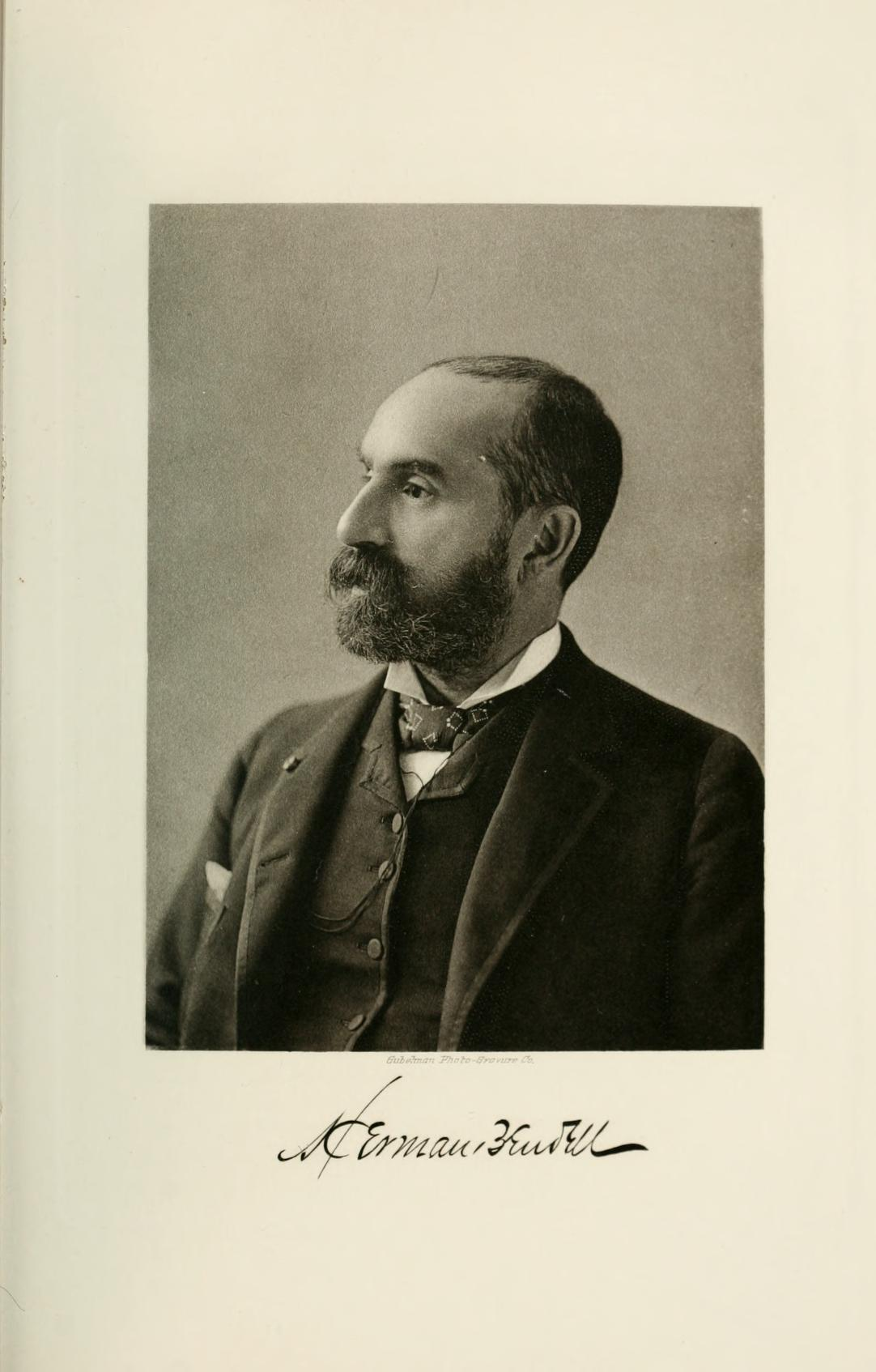

Superintendent of Indian Affairs, Arizona Territory
- In office 1871–1873
- President: Ulysses S. Grant
- Preceded by: George L. Andrews
- Succeeded by: Office abolished

Personal details
- Born: October 28, 1843 Albany, New York
- Died: November 14, 1932 (aged 89) Albany, New York
- Spouse: Wilhelmina Lewi
- Children: 4

Military service
- Branch/service: Union Army
- Years of service: 1862–65
- Battles/wars: American Civil War

Dr. Herman Bendell (October 28, 1843 – November 14, 1932) was an American physician active during and after the American Civil War, serving with both the 6th New York Heavy Artillery and the 86th New York Infantry. Dr. Bendell served with the Army of the Potomac, the Sheridan Campaign, and in the Shenandoah Valley. Following George L. Andrews, he served as the last Superintendent of Indian Affairs of the Arizona Territory.

== Early life ==
Bendell was born in Albany, New York, on October 28, 1843, to Elias and Hannah (née Stern). His immigrant grandparents were among the first Jews to settle in the city.

== Career ==
=== American Civil War ===
Bendell entered the service in the 39th New York Volunteer Infantry Regiment as a hospital steward in 1861 and was later appointed assistant surgeon. On September 1, 1861, he was commissioned as assistant surgeon to the 6th New York Heavy Artillery Regiment. He then returned to Albany Medical College to graduate with his class. After graduation in 1862, Dr. Bendell reentered the service as a surgeon with the 86th New York Volunteer Infantry on Feb 19, 1863. On January 3, 1865, he was promoted to surgeon and served until the end of the war, finishing as a brevetted lieutenant-colonel for meritorious service. After the war he retained his ties to the military. In September, 1866, he was appointed as examining surgeon for the Bureau of Pensions and, later, was appointed surgeon for the National Guard (New York State 3d Brigade). Bendell was a member of the Albany, NY chapter of the Military Order of the Loyal Legion of the United States .

=== Superintendent of Indian Affairs ===
In furthering President Grant's "Peace Policy" and choosing agents beyond the Quaker faith, with the urging of the Jewish community leader Simon Wolf, Bendell was appointed superintendent of Indian Affairs for the Arizona Territory. He arrived by way of San Diego and is considered the first Jew to settle in the city of Phoenix. His arrival was shortly after the infamous Camp Grant massacre. His first task was to accompany Gen. Oliver Otis Howard and members of various Indian tribes and the first Apache delegation to Washington, DC. Dr. Bendell accompanied five of the Native American chiefs on a brief excursion to his home in Albany, stopping at the temperance hotel founded by Edward C. Delavan. The five chiefs were

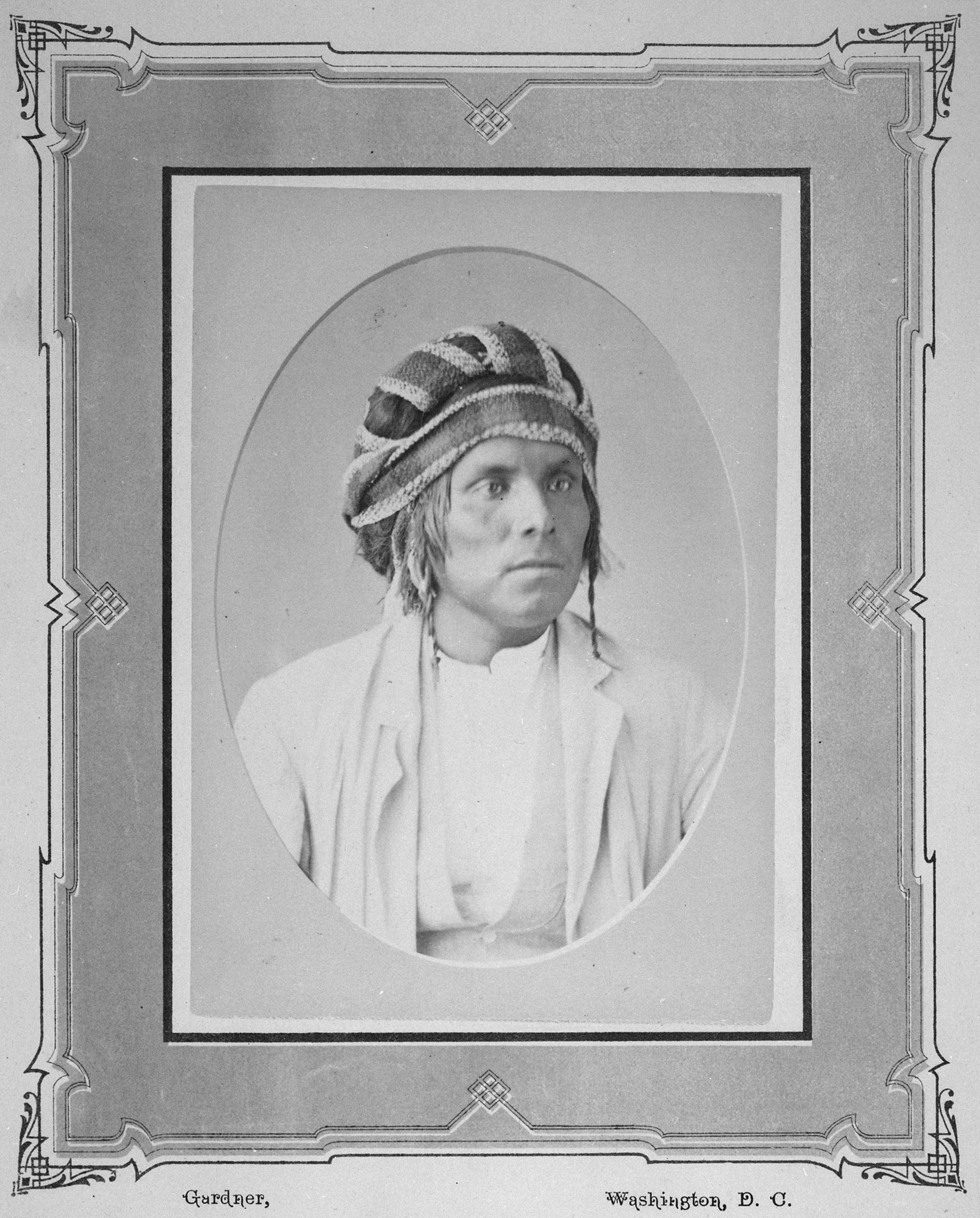
Antonio Azul - Pima Chief in 1872

1. Antonlito Azul- Pimo Chief
2. Louis Mohnjo- Pimo interpreter
3. Accension - Papago Sub-Chief
4. Josio Pakato - Apache Zuma
5. Carlos - Apache Mohave

News accounts described the chiefs' 'indifference' at the sights along the Hudson River, impressed only with the view from West Point. Bendell's appointment was a difficult posting at a tumultuous time in the Arizona Territory. The government intended to move the Apache tribes to reservations with a farming lifestyle. Dr. Bendell's report to Washington Indian Affairs commissioner Francis Amasa Walker, reprinted in New York Times, notes the tribal reluctance to accept the reservation conditions offered by the Government and the Native American hoarding of rations for the purpose of renewing raids upon settlers. Dr. Bendell was the superior officer of agent Tom Jeffords, chosen by Apache chief Cochise after a treaty made with General Oliver Otis Howard. Bendell petitioned for an increased budget as the original allocation was for three Chiricahua reservations, and by 1872 there were seven.

Many Indian agents of the time were accused of pilfering from the government monies allocated for the reservations. In General George Crook's autobiography, he notes that for Dr. Bendell 'it was generally understood that during his short stay in Arizona he carried off $50,000 for his share of the spoils' (pp. 183–184). No evidence was presented to support the allegation.

While in Arizona Dr. Bendell invested in a mine and resigned from his position on March 26, 1873.

=== Physician in Albany, NY ===
After resigning from the superintendent position, Dr. Bendell received a consular appointment to Elsinore, Denmark. He sailed with his new wife in late 1873 to Denmark for the very brief posting.

After his posting in Denmark, Dr. Bendell spent a year studying ophthalmology under the noted professor Otto Heinrich Enoch Becker in Heidelberg, Germany. He then returned to Albany, NY where he enjoyed a prominent medical career and civic activity for the rest of his life. He was president of the Board of Public Instruction from 1881 to 1882. As President of the New York State Medical Society, Dr. Bendell delivered the anniversary address in the state senate chamber in February 1894 on the topic "The Physician of Sacred History". He also taught otology at Albany Medical College. In 1913, Dr. Bendell cared for the wife of New York State impeached governor William Sulzer.

== Family and death ==
On September 16, 1873, Dr. Bendell married Wilhelmine Lewi, the daughter of Dr. Joseph Lewi. The marriage took place in Albany and was conducted by the reform Rabbi Isaac Mayer Wise.

Herman Bendell died on November 14, 1932, in Albany, New York, at the age of 89.

== Bibliography ==
- Annual Report Of the Commissioner of Indian Affairs to the Secretary of the Interior for the year 1872 (Report). Washington: Government Printing Office. 1872.
- Crook, George (1946). Schmitt, Martin (ed.). General George Crook His Autobiography. Oklahoma, United States of America: Norman: University of Oklahoma Press.
- Parker, Amasa Junius (1897). Landmarks of Albany County New York. New York: D. Mason & Co.
- Schwarz, Melissa (1992). Cochise Apache Chief. Mexico: Chelsea House Publishers. ISBN 0-7910-1706-0.
- Stewart, Maj, Jacques J. (1993-06-05). The U.S. Government and the Apache Indians, 1871-1876: A Case Study in Counterinsurgency (MMAS). Kutztown University, Kutztown, Pennsylvania, United States of America.
