= Temple Ohabei Shalom Cemetery =

Historic Jewish cemetery in Massachusetts

- U.S. National Register of Historic Places
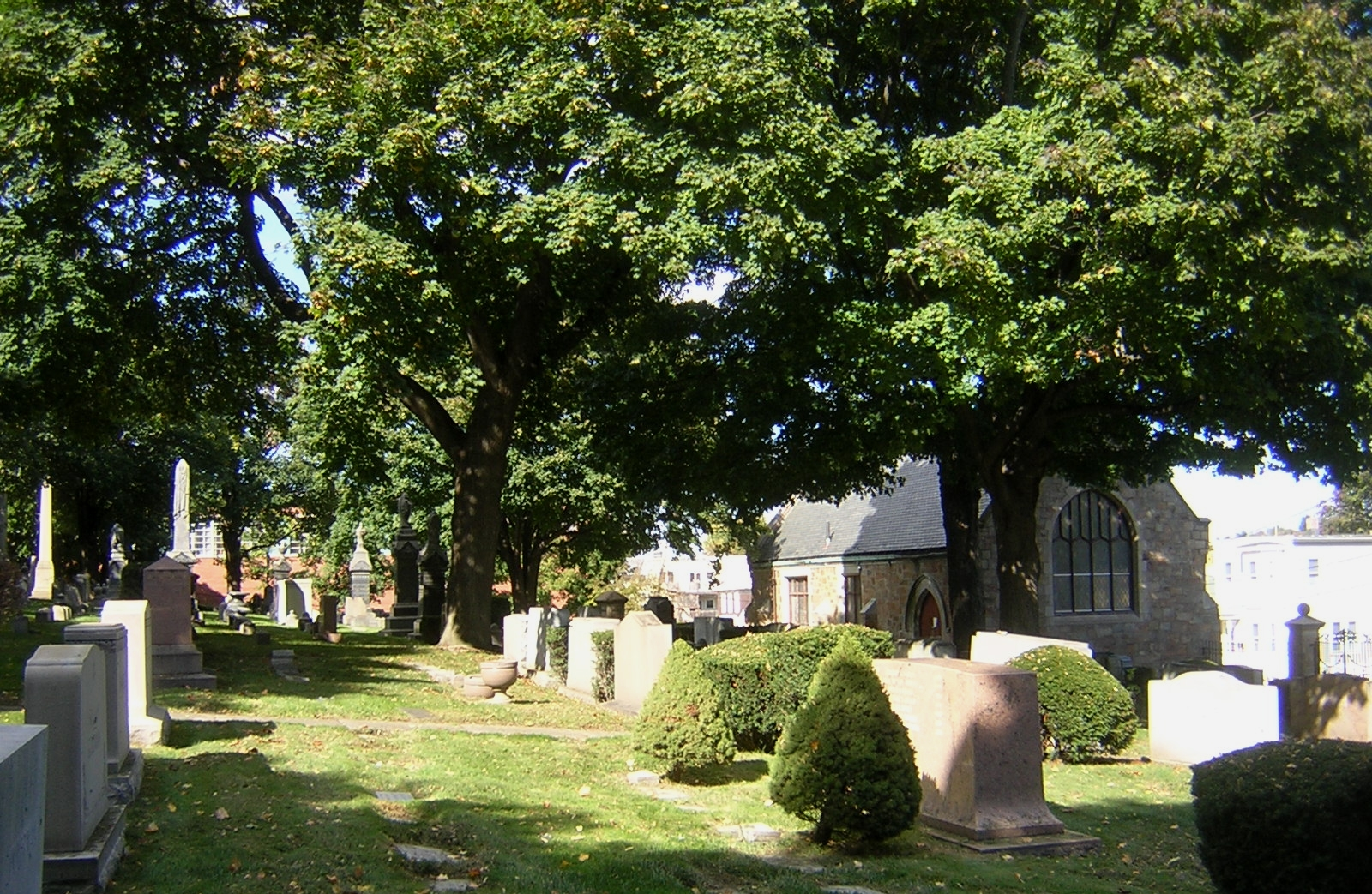
- View of the cemetery in 2009.
- Location: 147 Wordsworth Street; East Boston, Massachusetts
- Coordinates: 42°22′57″N 71°0′52.5″W
- Area: 2.4 acres (0.97 ha)
- Built: 1844
- Architect: John A. Hasty
- Architectural style: Gothic Revival
- NRHP reference No.: 08000795
- Added to NRHP: August 19, 2008

Temple Ohabei Shalom Cemetery is a historic Jewish cemetery located at 147 Wordsworth Street in East Boston, Massachusetts.

== History ==
In 1844, Boston's first synagogue, the Temple Ohabei Shalom in Brookline, asked permission from the Boston City Council to purchase the lot as a burying place. This cemetery was the first legally established Jewish cemetery in the state. Prior to this, Jews from Boston were buried in more distant locations such as Touro Cemetery in Rhode Island. In 1996, the Temple Ohabei Shalom ceded the property to the Jewish Cemetery Association.

It was added to the National Register of Historic Places in 2008. It became the first Jewish cemetery to receive the honor.

== Chapel ==
The cemetery is home to the oldest surviving Jewish chapel in Massachusetts, dedicated in 1903. The Mystic River Jewish Project is currently restoring the Gothic Revival chapel for use as a museum.

== Gallery ==
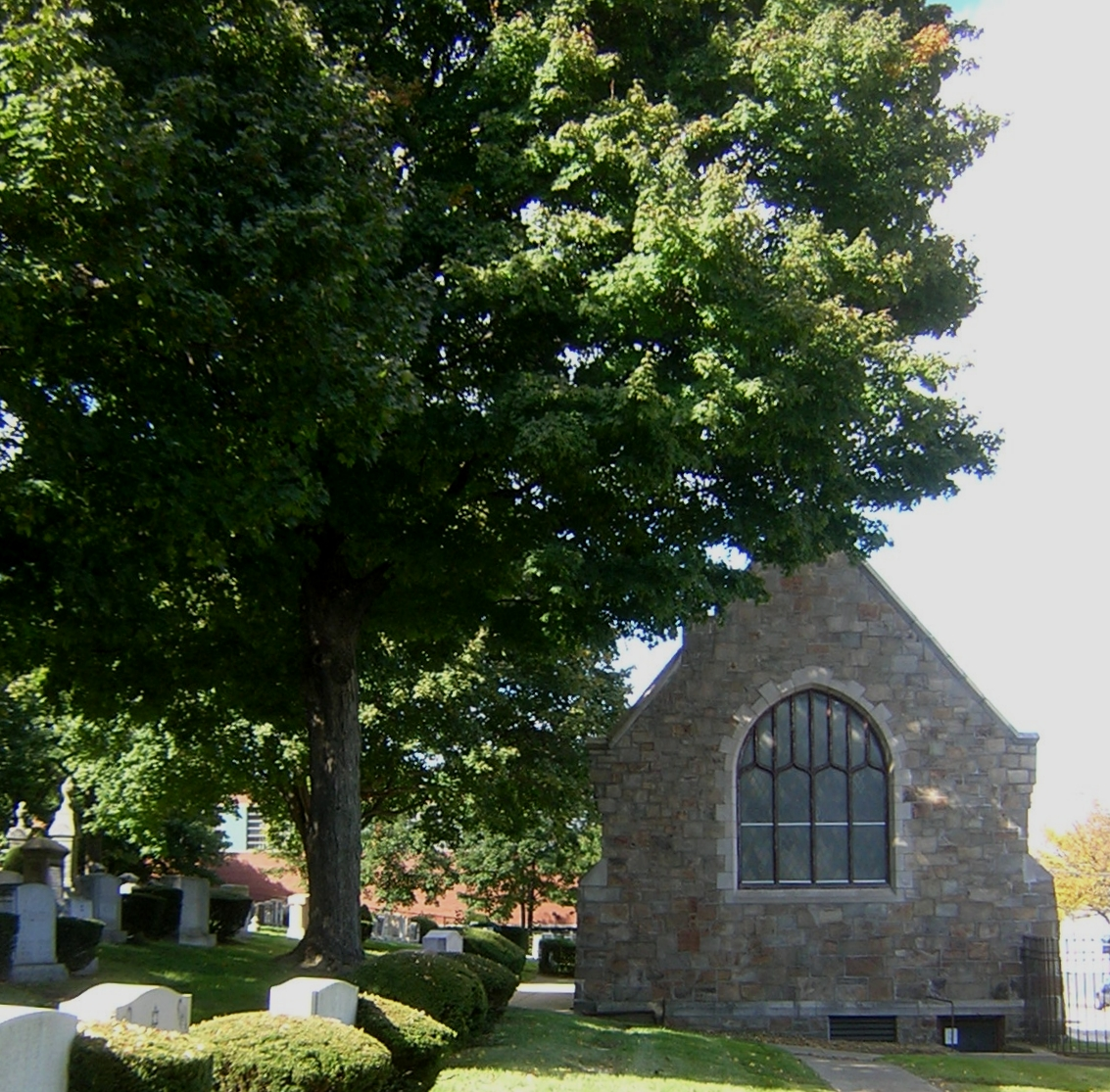
South side of the chapel

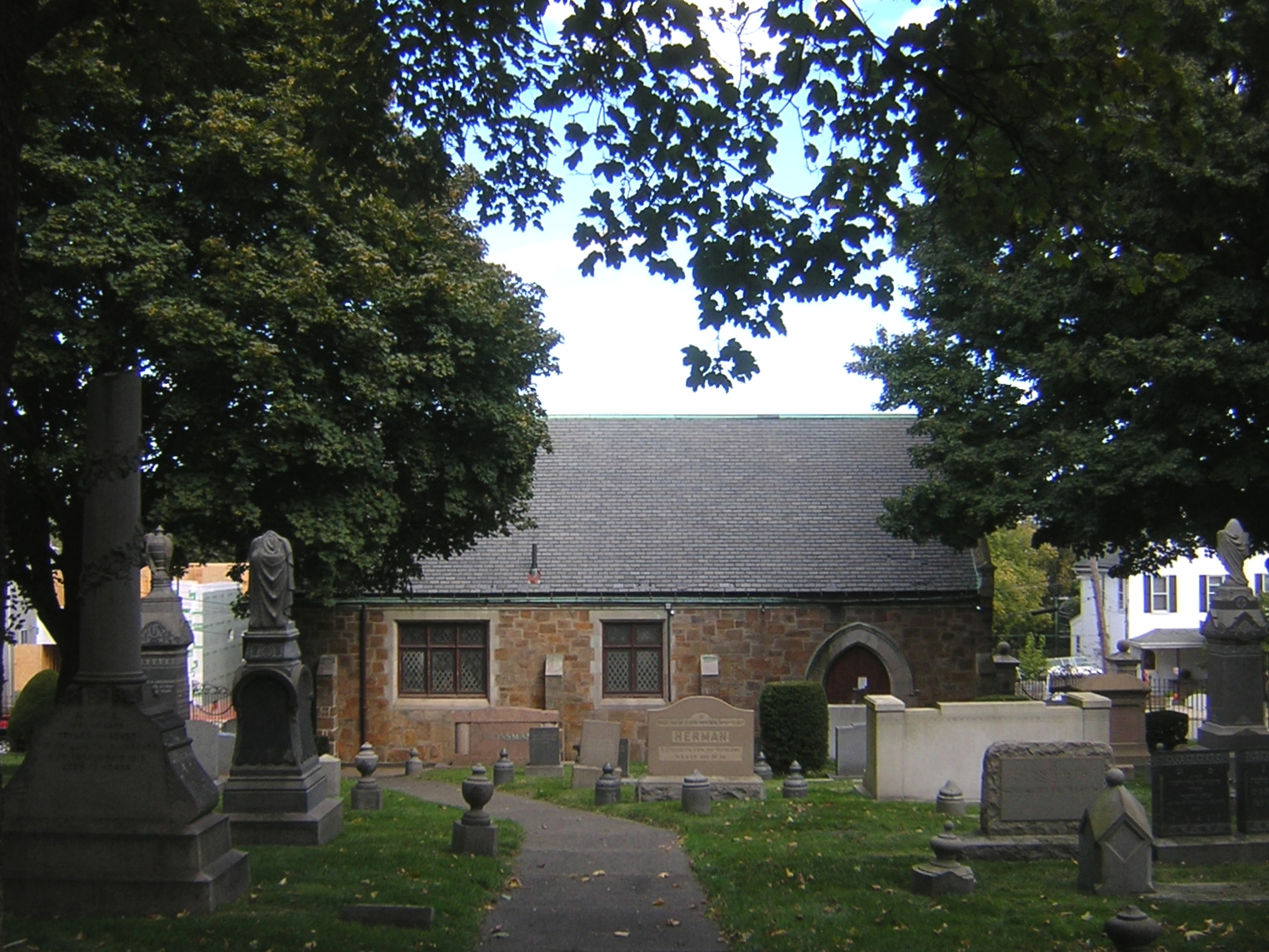
West side of the chapel

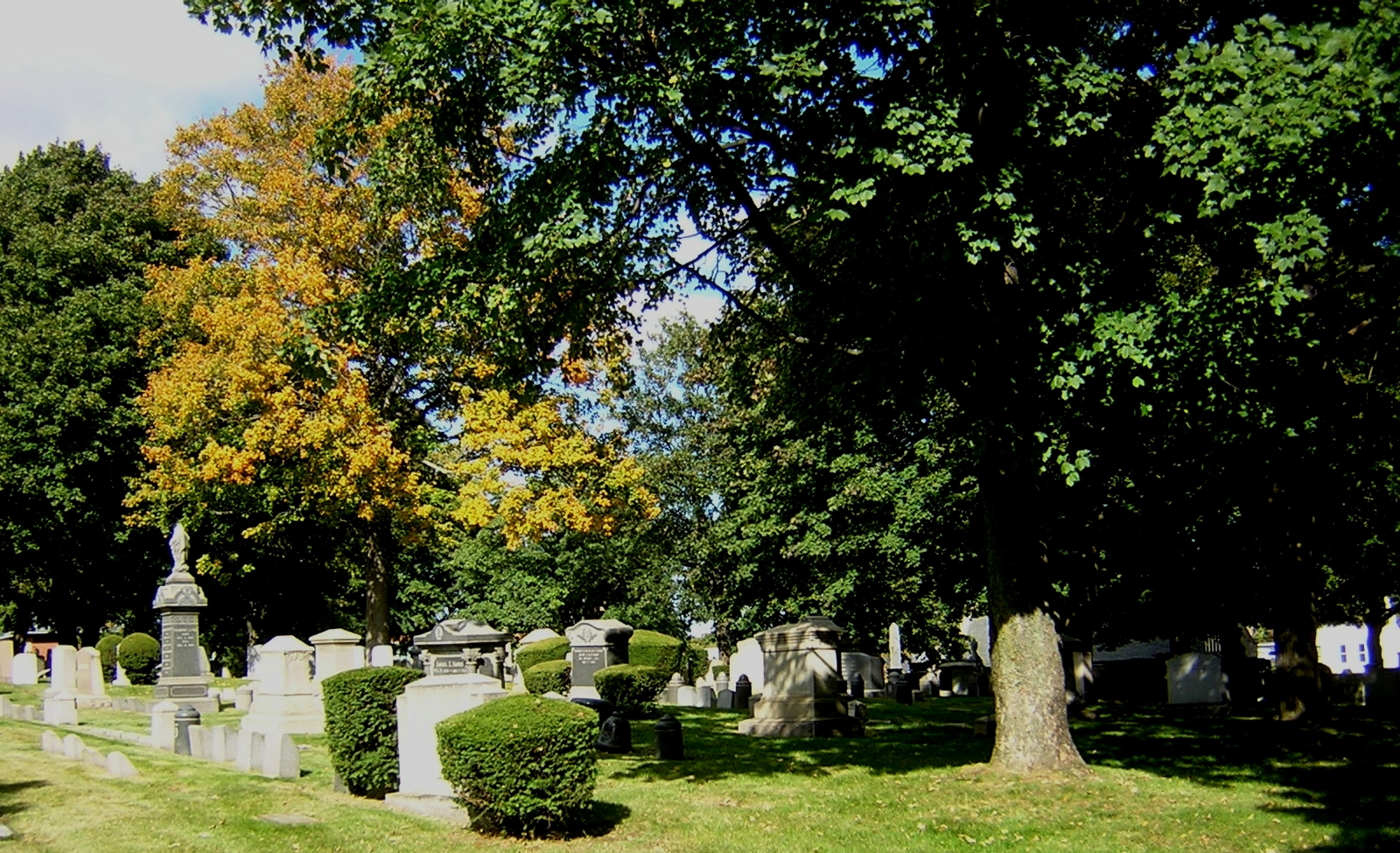
View of cemetery with trees

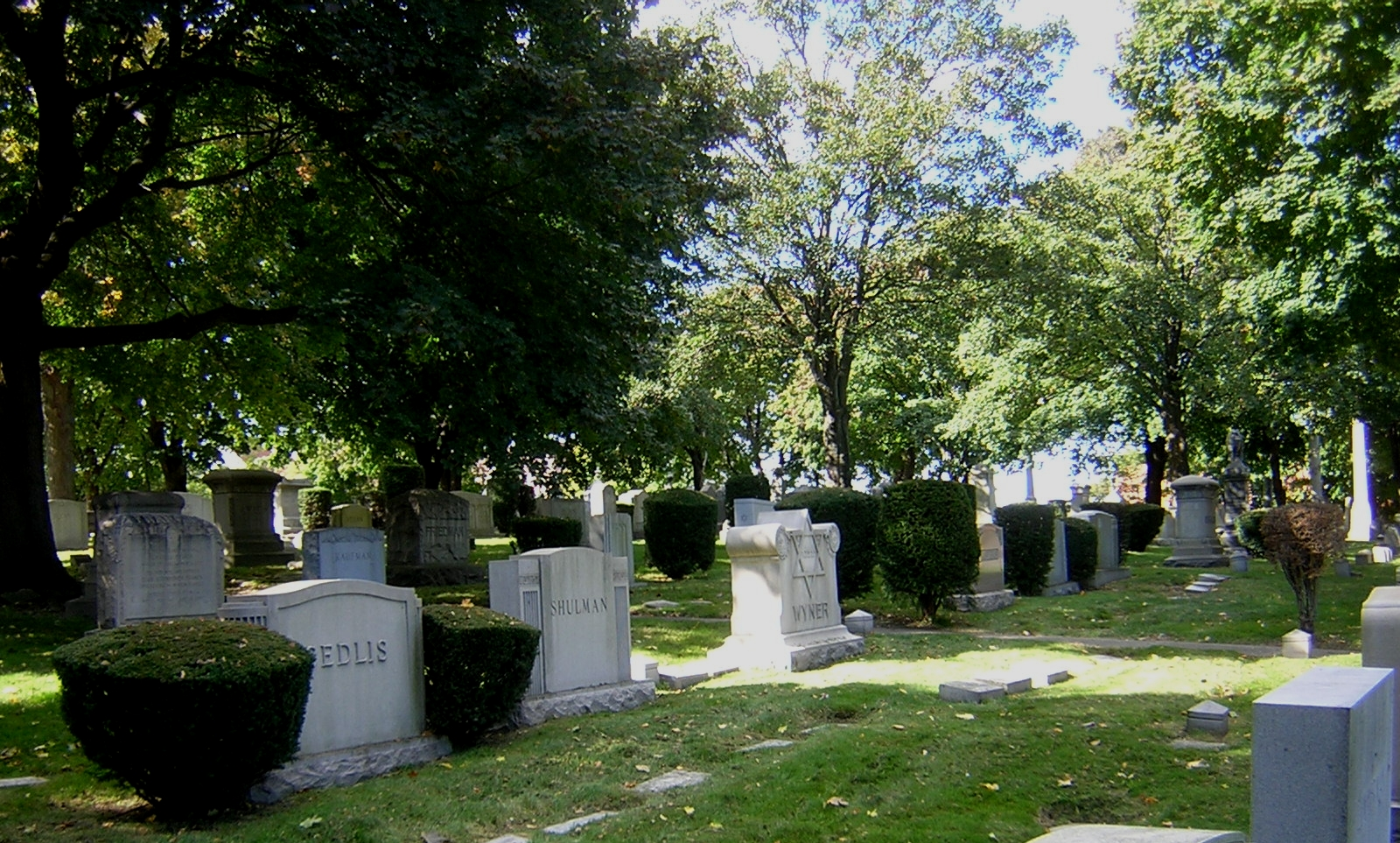
View of a row of gravestones

== See also ==
- National Register of Historic Places listings in northern Boston, Massachusetts
