= Bernard G. Richards =

Bernard Gerson Richards
- Born: March 9, 1877; Keidan, Lithuania
- Died: June 25, 1971 (aged 94); New York
- Education: New York University, The New School
- Occupation: Author
- Spouse: Getrude Gruzinski
- Writing career
- Subject: Writing

Bernard Gerson Richards (BGR) (b. March 9, 1877 Dov-Gershon Rabinovich in Keidan, Lithuania – d. June 25, 1971) was a Jewish author and a leader. His career spanned over 50 years.

When he came to the United States (1886), he furthered his education through self-study. He supported himself as peddler, clerk in a dry goods store.

He began his journalistic career as a reporter on the Boston Post, and wrote for several Boston and New York papers, as well as for Yiddish newspapers in New York, Denver, and Boston and other Jewish journals, including the American Hebrew and The New Palestine. He also edited New Era Illustrated Magazine till 1911.

Richards was very active in establishing educational networks., In 1915 helped in the founding of the American Jewish Congress, first introduced on August 30, 1914. He's founded the Jewish Information Bureau of Greater New York (1932), as well as the American Jewish Institute, New York (1942) to further adult education.

In 1903 he married former Gertrude Gruzinski and had four children.

Richards was an American delegate to the Versailles Peace Conference after World War I.
