= Emanuel Famíra =

Czech painter and sculptor

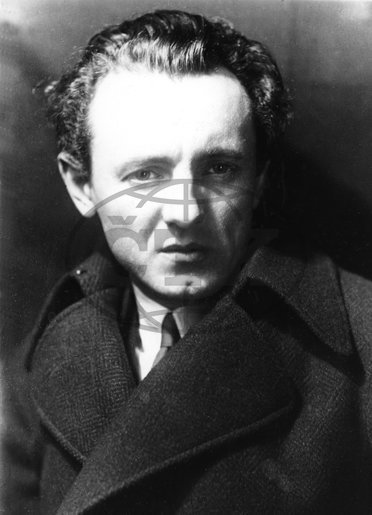

Emanuel Famíra (15 November 1900, Hlinsko – 6 January 1970, Prague), was a Czechoslovak sculptor and painter. In 1933 a statue in memory of miners by Famíra was built in village of Vranov in Břasy. Demolished by German authorities in 1941. Famíra, lifelong communist, became one of prominent artists of socialist realism. In 1968–1969 Famíra was member of ultraleft group of Czech communists who supported the Soviet invasion of Czechoslovakia.
