= Isidor Lewi =

American journalist

Isidor Lewi (May 9, 1850 – January 3, 1939) was a journalist who served on the editorial board of the New York Tribune. He once interviewed Charles Dickens.

Lewi was the eldest child of Dr. Joseph Lewi, who emigrated from Bohemia to Albany, New York in 1849. Born in Albany on May 9, 1850, he was educated in the Albany Academy. His wife was Emita May (d. on January 23, 1931), they were noted in their community for charitable work.

Lewi once shook hands with Abraham Lincoln. He also edited and published The New Era Illustrated Magazine.

Lewi is remembered as a witness to history. On January 3, 1939, he died in his apartment at a residential hotel in Manhattan while recuperating from a broken leg.
