= Raphael Lasker =

Raphael Lasker (February 19, 1838 – September 12, 1904) was a German-born American rabbi in Ohio, New York City, and Boston.

== Life ==
Lasker was born on February 19, 1838, in Zirke, Prussia, the son of Meyer and Rose Lasker.

Lasker was educated by his father, the rabbi of Zirke, as well as by rabbi Joseph Chayyim Caro of Pinne and rabbis Feilchenfeld and Mendel of Rogasen. He later attended the gymnasium in Gleiwitz and the University of Giessen. He immigrated to America in 1858 and founded Congregation B'nai Abraham in Portsmouth, Ohio. In 1862, he moved to New York City, New York, and became rabbi of Congregation Shaar Hashomayim. In 1871, he became rabbi of Temple Israel in Brooklyn. He became rabbi of Temple Ohabei Shalom in Boston, Massachusetts, in 1876.

Lasker was a member of the Boston Public School Board for six years, and from 1901 to 1903 served as the first editor of The New Era Magazine, a Jewish periodical. In 1858, he married Ernestine Karger. Their children were Jacob, Alexander, Meyer, Arthur, Julia, Isabella, Lillie, and Florence.

Lasker died at his home in New York City from a complication of diseases on September 12, 1904. He was buried in Beth El Cemetery in Ridgewood, Queens.
