= The New Era Illustrated Magazine =

American Jewish periodical

The New Era Illustrated Magazine, began in early 1900s in the United States. It was a leading American Jewish periodical (monthly), devoted to matters of interest to Jews and not the organ of any class, nor the mouthpiece of any individual. Its title was changed in 1903 from New Era Jewish Magazine when moved from Boston to New York City.

Rabbi Raphael Lasker served as the first editor of New Era from 1901 to 1903. Isidor Lewi (1850-1939), a well-known journalist who served on the editorial board of the New York Tribune, was the editor and publisher of New Era Illustrated Magazine.

The magazine ran till 1935/6.

== See also ==
- Bernard G Richards
