= New-York Tribune =

Defunct American newspaper

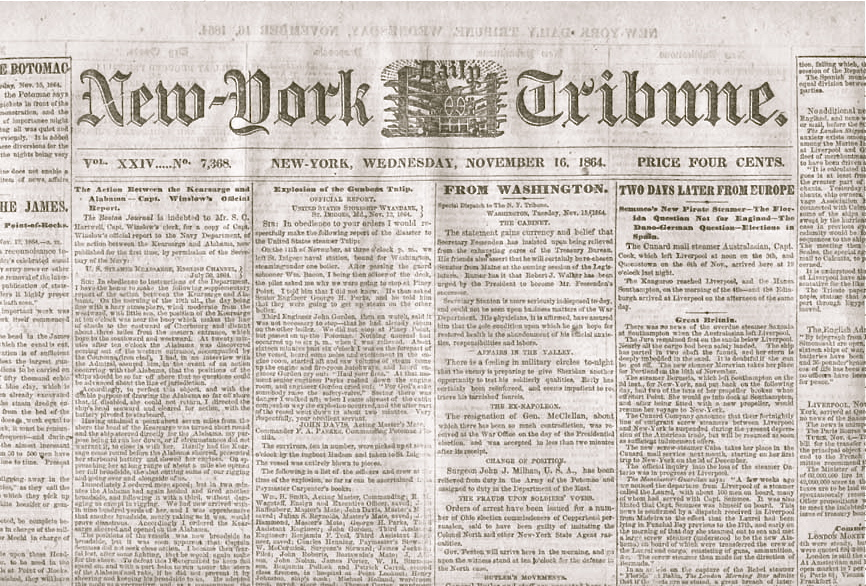
- Front page of the November 16, 1864 edition of New-York Tribune
- Type: Daily newspaper
- Format: Broadsheet
- Founded: 1841
- Ceased publication: 1924; 102 years ago; merged with New York Herald to form the New York Herald Tribune
- Headquarters: Manhattan, New York City, U.S.

The New-York Tribune (from April 16, 1914: New York Tribune) was an American newspaper founded in 1841 by editor Horace Greeley. It bore the moniker New-York Daily Tribune from 1842 to 1866 before returning to its original name. From the 1840s through the 1860s it was the dominant newspaper first of the American Whig Party, then of the Republican Party. The paper achieved a circulation of approximately 200,000 in the 1850s, making it the largest daily paper in New York City at the time.

The Tribune's editorials were widely read, shared, and copied in other city newspapers, helping to shape national opinion. It was one of the first papers in the North to send reporters, correspondents, and illustrators to cover the campaigns of the American Civil War. It continued as an independent daily newspaper until 1924, when it merged with the New York Herald. The resulting New York Herald Tribune remained in publication until 1966.

Among those who served on the paper's editorial board were Bayard Taylor, George Ripley, and Isidor Lewi.

== History ==
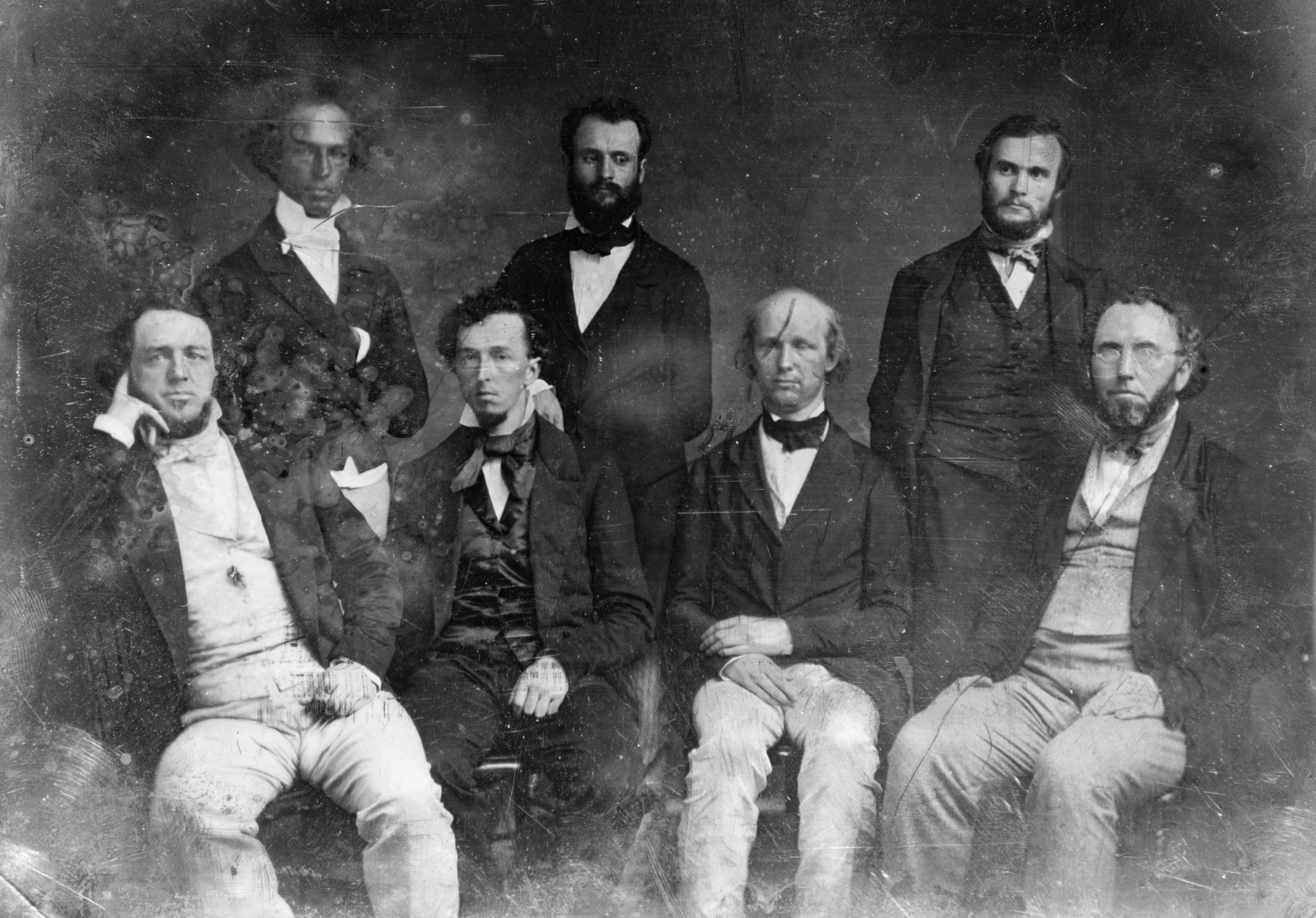
Daguerreotype of the Tribune editorial staff by famed later Civil War photographer Mathew Brady (1822–1896), taken c. 1850s. Horace Greeley (1811–1872), is seated, second from the right. Editor Charles Anderson Dana (1819–1897), is standing, center.

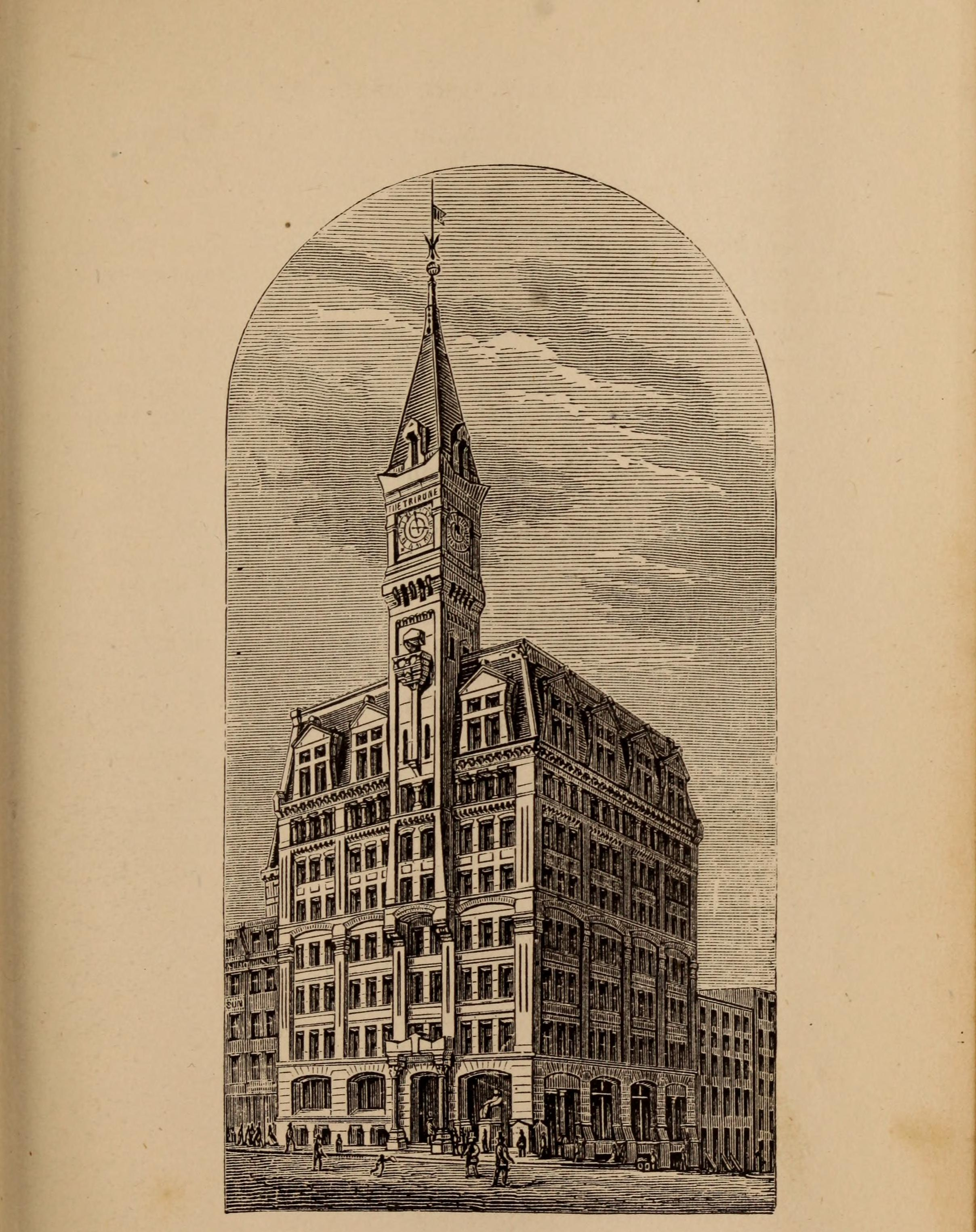
The New York Tribune Building, which is now One Pace Plaza in Lower Manhattan

The Tribune was created by Horace Greeley in 1841 with the goal of providing a straightforward, trustworthy media source. Greeley had previously published a weekly newspaper, The New Yorker (unrelated to the later modern magazine of the same name), in 1833 and was also publisher of the Whig Party's political organ, Log Cabin. In 1841, he merged operations of these two publications into a newspaper that he named the New-York Tribune.

Greeley sponsored a host of reforms, including pacifism and feminism and especially the ideal of the hardworking free laborer. Greeley demanded reforms to make all citizens free and equal. He envisioned virtuous citizens who would eradicate corruption. He talked endlessly about progress, improvement, and freedom, while calling for harmony between labor and capital. Greeley's editorials promoted social democratic reforms and were widely reprinted. They influenced the free-labor ideology of the Whigs and the radical wing of the Republican Party, especially in promoting the free-labor ideology. Before 1848 he sponsored an American version of Fourierist socialist reform, but backed away after the failed revolutions of 1848 in Europe.

To promote multiple reforms, Greeley hired a roster of writers who later became famous in their own right, including Margaret Fuller, Charles Anderson Dana, George William Curtis, William Henry Fry, Bayard Taylor, George Ripley, Julius Chambers, and Henry Jarvis Raymond, who later co-founded The New York Times.

Between 1852 and 1862, the paper retained Karl Marx as its London-based European correspondent. Friedrich Engels also submitted articles under Marx's by-line. Marx resented much of his time working for the Tribune, particularly the many edits and deadlines they imposed upon him, and bemoaned the "excessive fragmentation of [his] studies", noting that since much of his work was reporting on current economic events, "I was compelled to become conversant with practical detail which, strictly speaking, lie outside the sphere of political economy". Engels wrote "It doesn't matter if they are never read again.". In the same correspondence Marx disparagingly referred to the publication as a "blotting paper vendor". Nevertheless, Engels cited this career as a positive achievement of Marx's during a eulogy given at his funeral.

Edgar Allan Poe's poem "Annabel Lee" was first published in the newspaper as part of his October 9, 1849, obituary, "Death of Edgar A. Poe", by Rufus Griswold. In addition, Poe's "The Bells" was published in the October 17, 1849, issue as "Poe's Last Poem".

=== Political influence ===
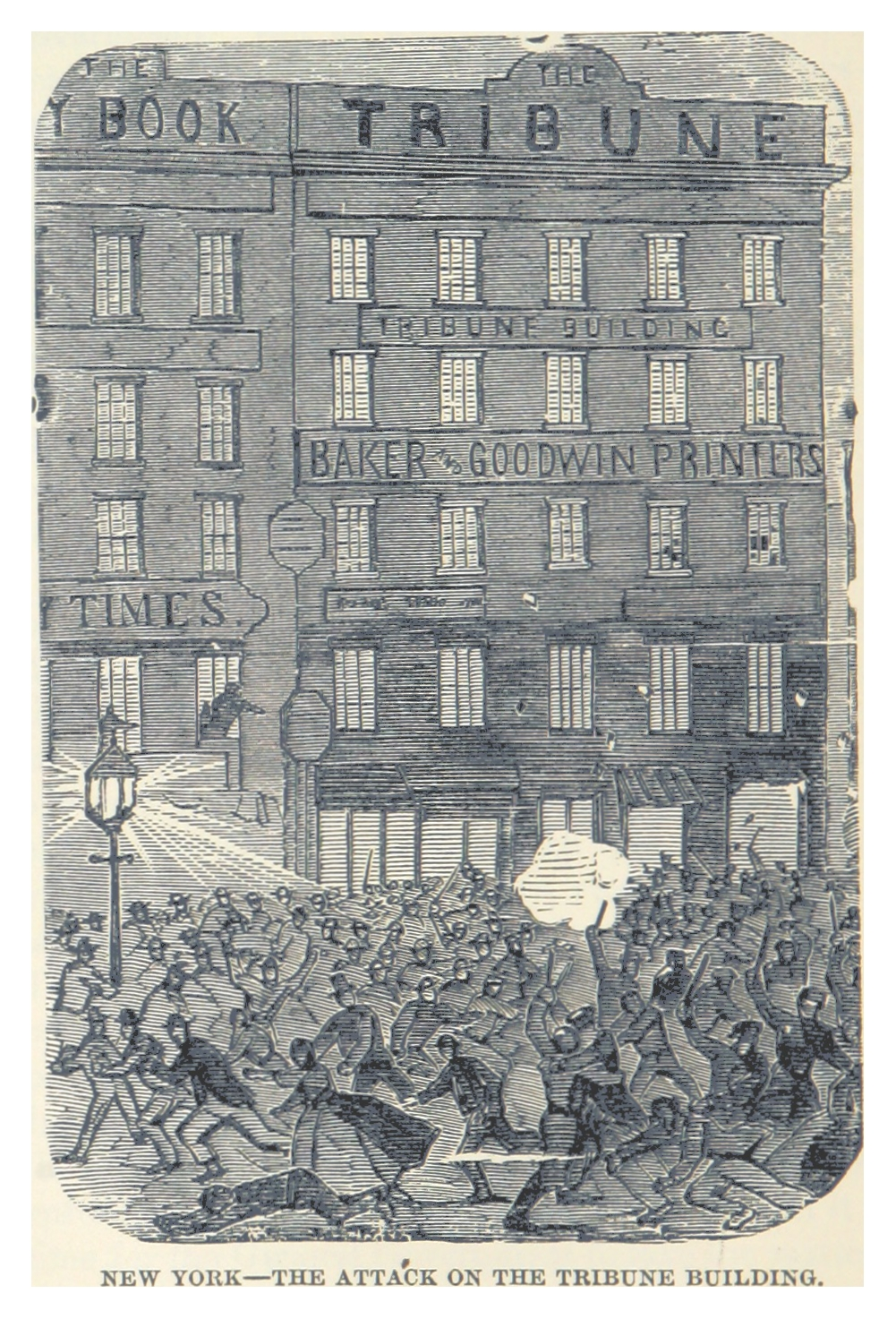
Attack on the Tribune building in lower Manhattan during the Draft Riots, 1863

Founded in a time of civil unrest, the paper joined the newly formed Republican Party in 1854, named it after the party of Thomas Jefferson, and emphasized its opposition to slavery. The paper generated a large readership, with a circulation of approximately 200,000 during the 1850s. This made the paper the largest circulation daily in New York City—gaining commensurate influence among voters and political decision-makers in the process. During the Civil War Greeley crusaded against slavery, lambasting Democrats while calling for a mandatory draft of soldiers for the first time in the U.S. This led to an Irish mob attempting to burn down the Tribune building in lower Manhattan during the Draft Riots.

Greeley ran for president as the nominee of the Liberal Republican Party (and also of the Democratic Party) in the 1872 election against incumbent Ulysses S. Grant in his bid for a second term. Greeley was unsuccessful and, soon after the defeat, checked into Dr. George C.S. Choate's Sanitarium, where he died only a few weeks later. Tribune editor Whitelaw Reid purchased the paper following Greeley's death.

In 1886, with Reid's support, the Tribune became the first publication in the world to be printed on a linotype machine, which was invented by a German immigrant, inventor Ottmar Mergenthaler. This technique allowed it to exceed the standard newspaper size of only eight pages while still speeding up printing time per copy, thereby increasing the overall number of copies that could be printed.

=== New York Herald Tribune ===
Under Reid's son, Ogden Mills Reid, the paper acquired and merged with the New York Herald in 1924 to form the New York Herald Tribune. The New York Herald Tribune continued to be run by Ogden M. Reid until his death in 1947.

== Former Tribune buildings today ==
- The New York Tribune Building was the first home of Pace University. Today, the site where the building once stood is now the One Pace Plaza complex of Pace University's New York City campus. Dr. Choate's residence and private hospital, where Horace Greeley died, today is part of the campus of Pace University in Pleasantville, New York.
- On December 15, 1921, The New York Tribune bought two plots of ground at 219 and 220 West 40th Street. The headquarters that The New York Tribune built at that site is now the home of the City University of New York Graduate School of Journalism.

== Archives ==
Copies of the New-York Tribune are available on microfilm at many large libraries and online at the Library of Congress. Also, indices from selected years in the late nineteenth century are available on the Library of Congress' website. The original paper articles from the newspaper's morgue are kept at The Center for American History at the University of Texas at Austin.

== See also ==
- History of American newspapers
- The New Era Illustrated Magazine
