= Mystic River Jewish Communities Project =

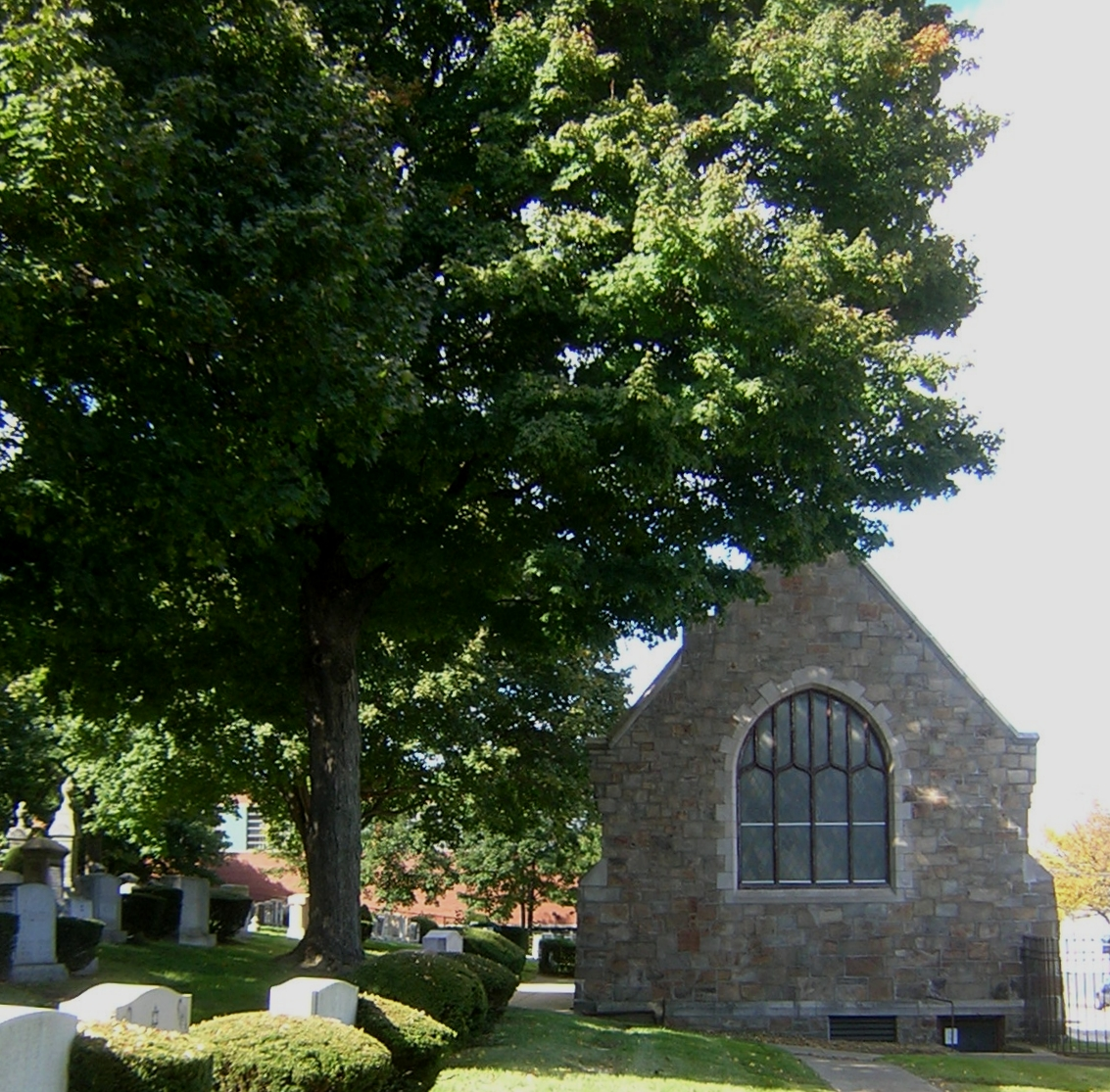
Temple Ohabei Shalom Cemetery chapel

The Mystic River Jewish Communities Project is a non-profit organization dedicated to preserving the heritage of the Mystic River Jewish communities of Chelsea, East Boston, Everett, Malden, Medford, Revere, Somerville, and Winthrop, Massachusetts.

== Museum project ==
The project is working on the restoration of the 1903 Gothic revival chapel of the Temple Ohabei Shalom Cemetery, located at Wordsworth & Horace Streets in East Boston, Massachusetts, for use as a museum.

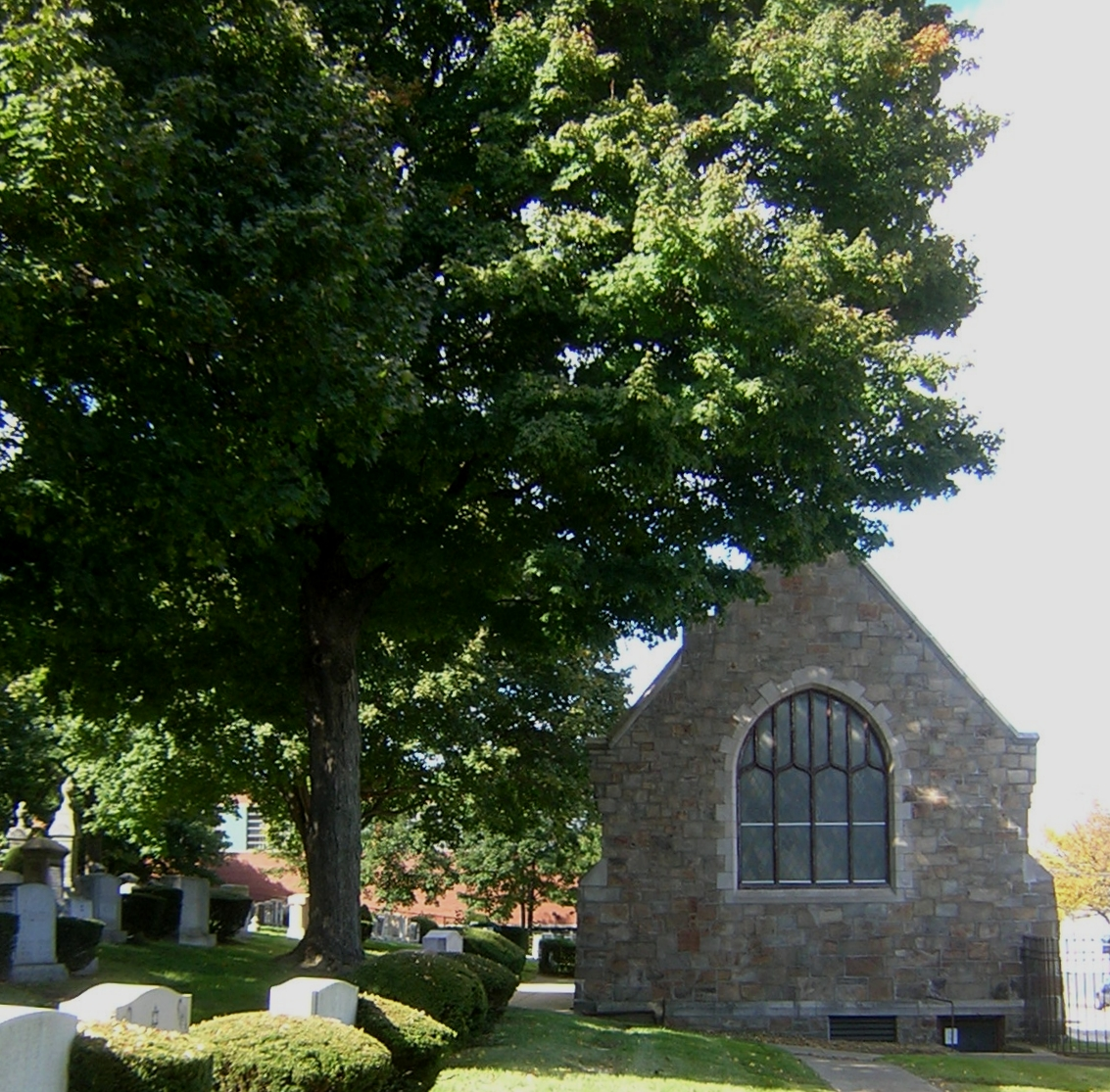
South side of the chapel

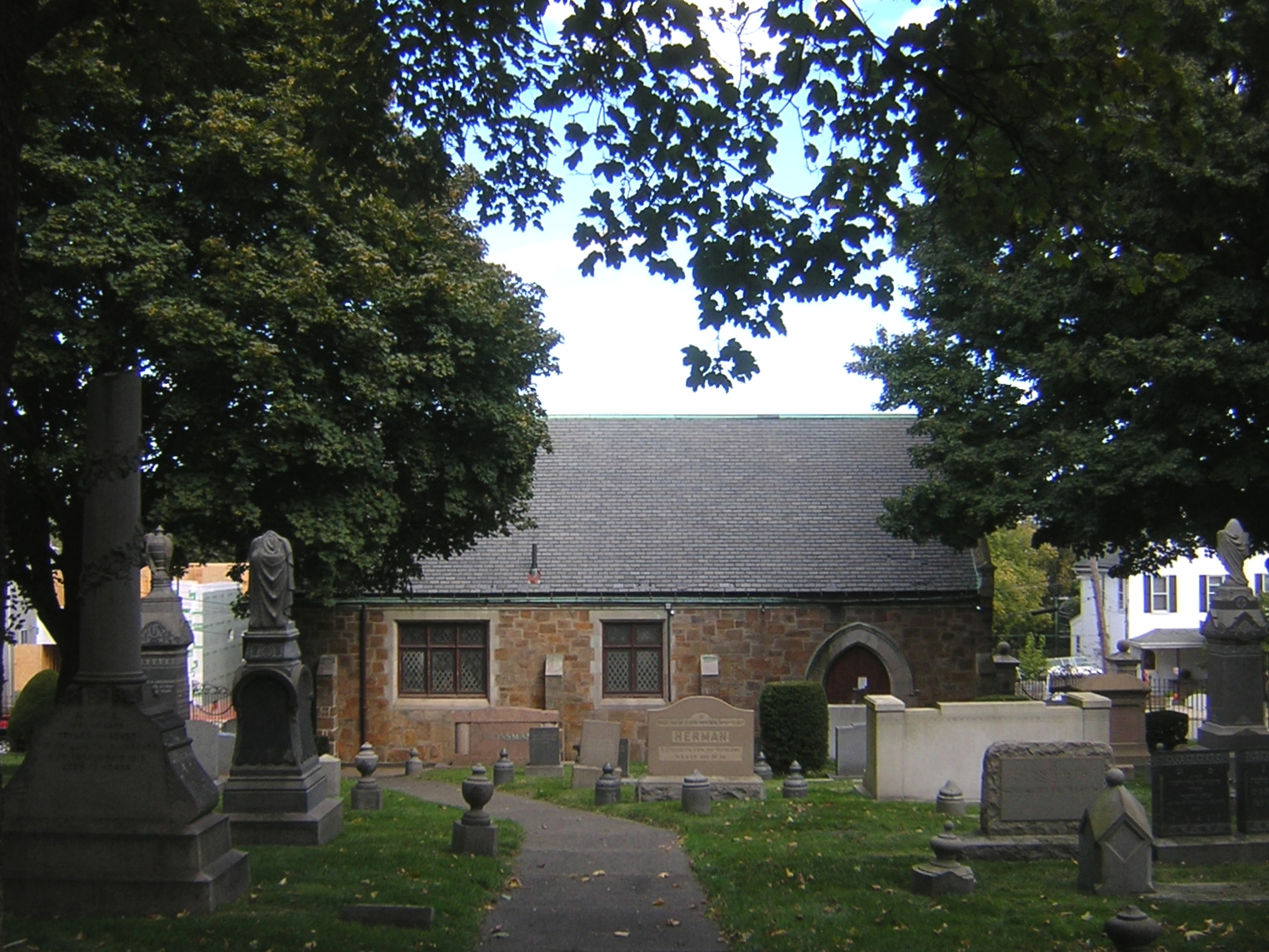
West side of the chapel

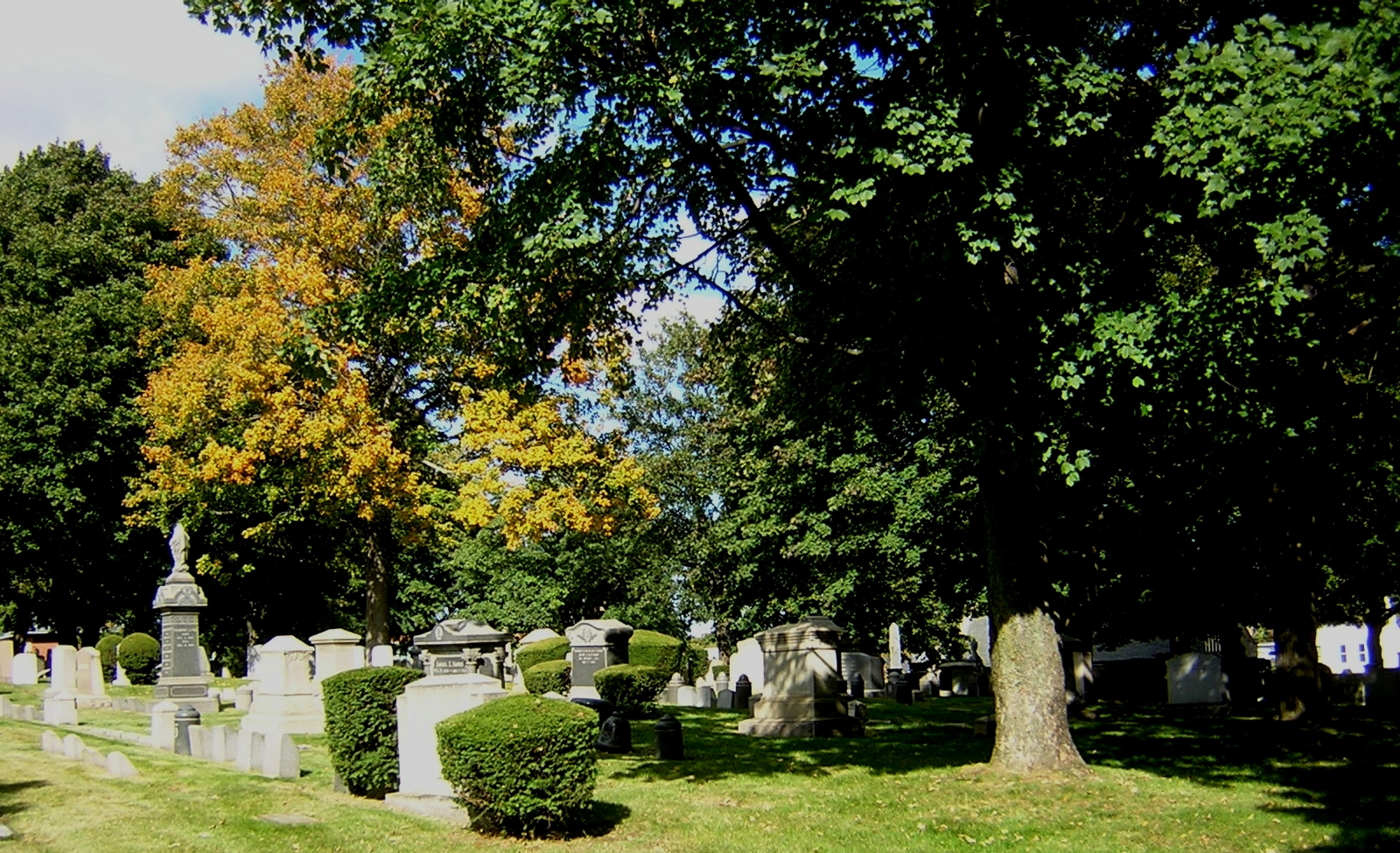
View of cemetery with trees

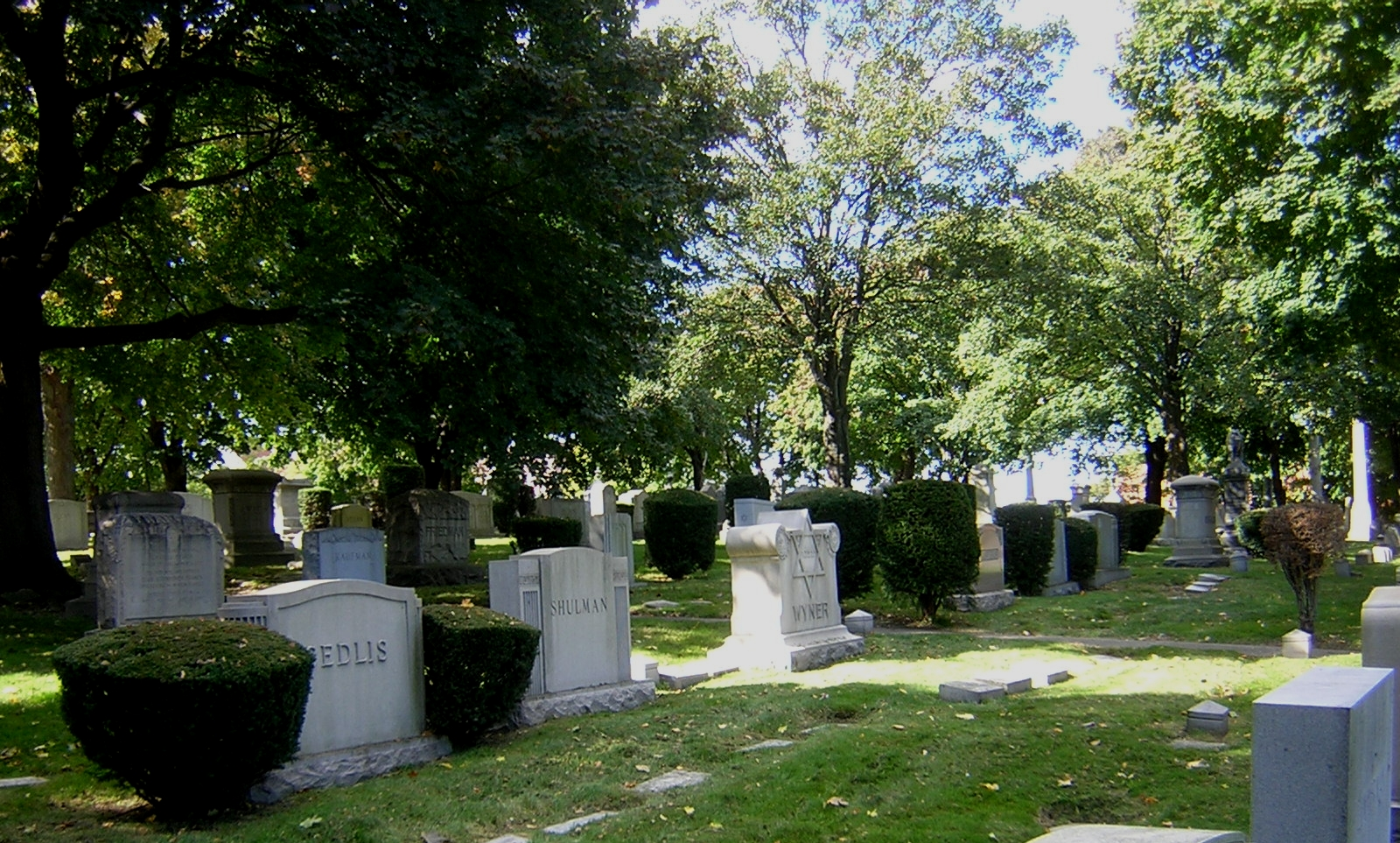
View of a row of gravestones
