= Radnice =

Town in Plzeň Region, Czech Republic

- Town
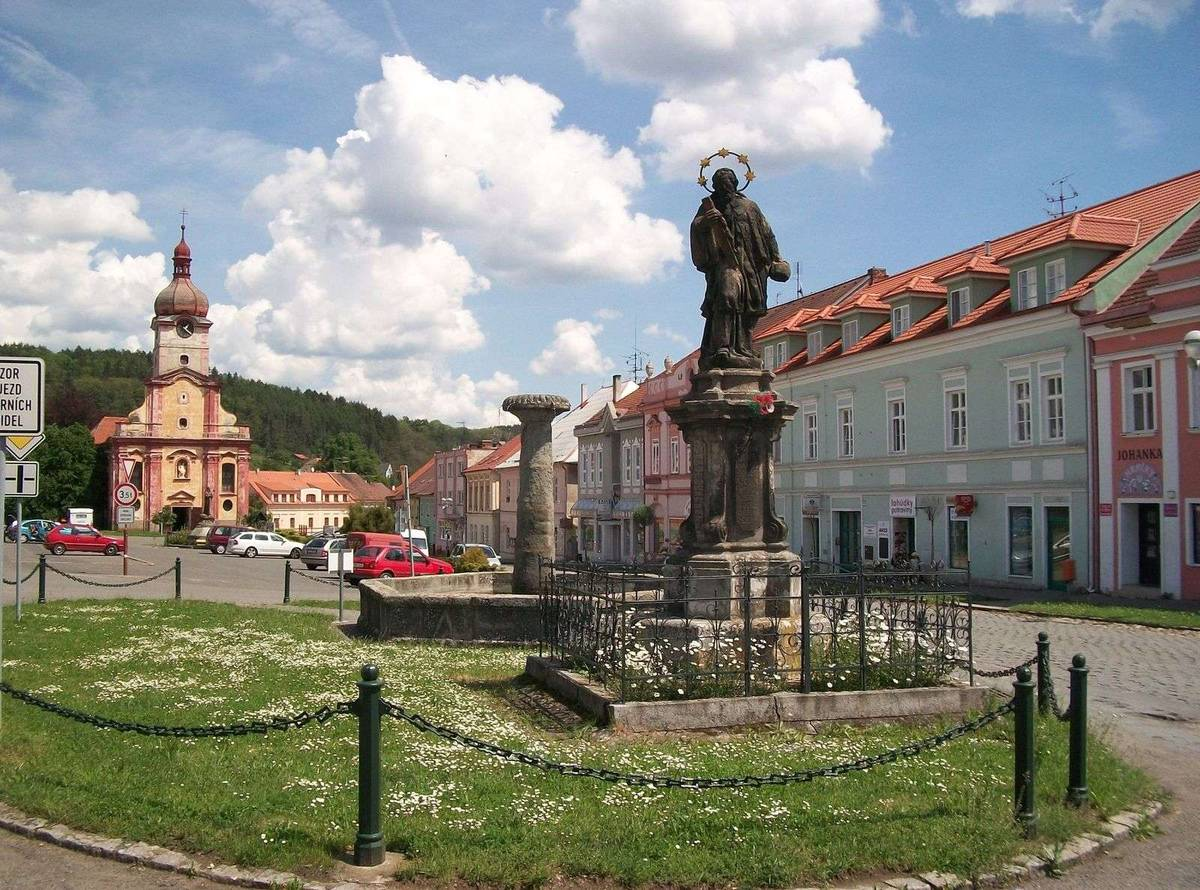
- Town square

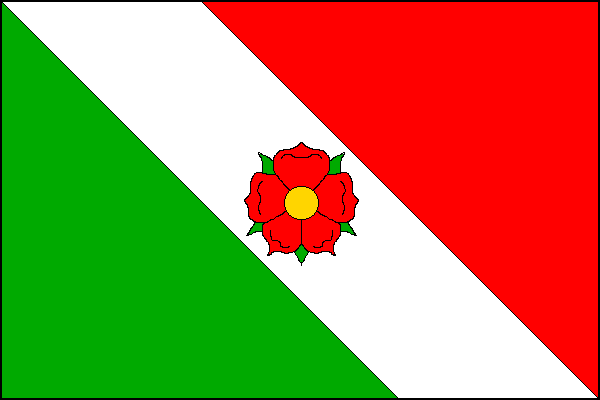
- Flag Coat of arms

- Location in the Czech Republic
- Coordinates: 49°51′27″N 13°36′26″E
- Country: Czech Republic
- Region: Plzeň
- District: Rokycany
- First mentioned: 1336

Government
  - Mayor: Jan Altman

Area
  - Total: 10.65 km^{2} (4.11 sq mi)
- Elevation: 382 m (1,253 ft)

Population (2026-01-01)
  - Total: 1,829
  - Density: 171.7/km^{2} (444.8/sq mi)
- Time zone: UTC+1 (CET)
  - Summer (DST): UTC+2 (CEST)
- Postal code: 338 28
- Website: www.mestoradnice.cz

Radnice (Czech pronunciation: [ˈradɲɪtsɛ]; German: Radnitz) is a town in Rokycany District in the Plzeň Region of the Czech Republic. It has about 1,800 inhabitants. The town is located on the stream Radnický potok in the Plasy Uplands.

Radnice was founded in the first half of the 14th century at the latest and became a town in 1570. In the 19th and 20th centuries, it was known for coal mining. The main landmark of Radnice is the Church of Saint Wenceslaus.

== Administrative division ==
Radnice consists of two municipal parts (in brackets population according to the 2021 census):

- Radnice (1,720)
- Svatá Barbora (28)

== Etymology ==
The word radnice means 'town hall' in modern Czech, however, this is just a coincidence. The town's name is derived from the personal name Raden, meaning "the village of Raden's people".

== Geography ==
Radnice is located about 13 kilometres (8 mi) north of Rokycany and 19 km (12 mi) northeast of Plzeň. It lies in the Plasy Uplands. The highest point is the hill Rovnička at 502 m (1,647 ft) above sea level. The stream Radnický potok flows through the town. The fishpond Městský rybník is located inside the built-up area.

== History ==
The first written mention of Radnice is from 1336, when King John of Bohemia sold it to the Rosenberg family. In 1478, Radnice was acquired by the Sternberg family. From 1541 to 1620, it was owned by the Czernin family. In 1570, Radnice was promoted to a town by Emperor Maximilian II.

After the Battle of White Mountain, properties of the Czernin family were confiscated, and Radnice changed owners several times. During the Thirty Years' War, the town was looted several times. From 1758 until the abolition of manorialsm, Radnice was again property of the Rosenbergs.

In the 19th century, coal mining developed in vicinity of Radnice igniting industrial development. In 1893, the railway was built. Radnice coal basin was depleted in 1986.

== Demographics ==
Historical population

Year	Pop.	±%
1869	3,034	—
1880	3,021	−0.4%
1890	2,739	−9.3%
1900	2,739	+0.0%
1910	2,558	−6.6%

Year	Pop.	±%
1921	2,513	−1.8%
1930	2,478	−1.4%
1950	2,021	−18.4%
1961	2,220	+9.8%
1970	2,064	−7.0%

Year	Pop.	±%
1980	1,864	−9.7%
1991	1,729	−7.2%
2001	1,699	−1.7%
2011	1,733	+2.0%
2021	1,748	+0.9%

Source: Censuses

== Transport ==
The railway line from Plzeň terminates in the town.

== Sights ==
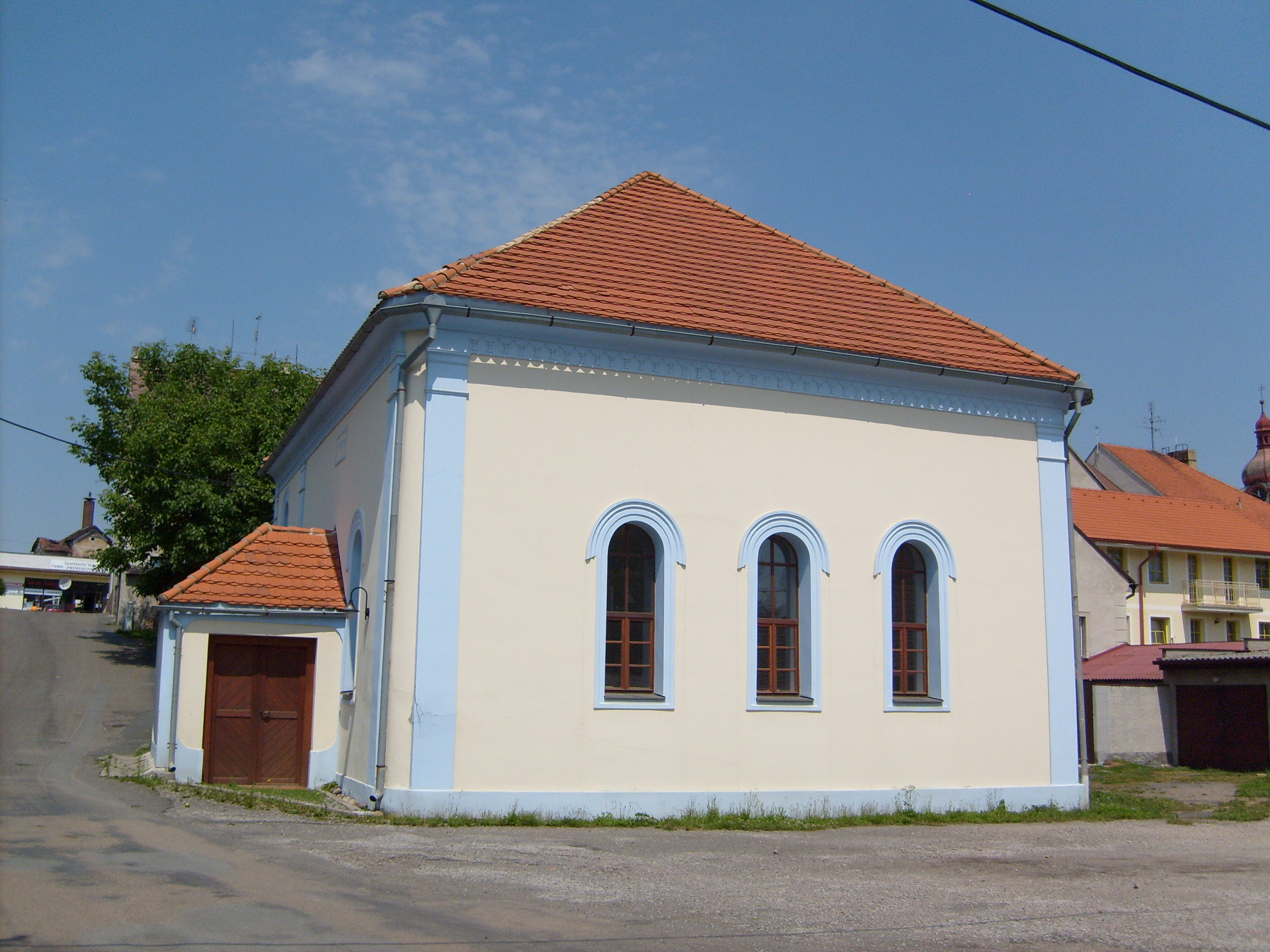
Former synagogue

The main landmark of the town centre is the Church of Saint Wenceslaus. It was originally a medieval church, first mentioned in 1385. It was completely rebuilt in the Baroque style around 1720, probably according to the design by Jakub Auguston.

On a hill above the town is the Chapel of the Visitation of the Virgin Mary, designed by Kilian Ignaz Dientzenhofer. It was built in the Baroque style around 1735. The way to the chapel is lined with the Stations of the Cross.

The former synagogue is a well preserved late Baroque building from the end of the 18th century.

The most important Jewish monument is the cemetery with 210 preserved tombstones. The cemetery includes many artistically valuable tombstones, the oldest of which dates from 1734. The cemetery was used until 1935.

The town museum is located in a valuable house from the first third of the 18th century. The museum bears the name of its founder, teacher Josef Hylák, and focuses on the ethnography, history and nature of Radnice and its surroundings.

== Notable people ==
- Isaac Mayer Wise (1819–1900), American Reform rabbi; worked here in 1843–1846
- Joseph Lewi (1820–1897), American medical doctor
- Václav Kotva (1922–2004), actor
