= Order of St. Thomas =

Order of St. Thomas may refer to:

- Order of St. Thomas (award)
- Order of St. Thomas (religious order)
- Order of Saint Thomas of Acon
