= Royal Arch Masonry =

Part of the rites of Masonry

The Triple Tau. (Grand Emblem of Royal Arch Masonry)

Royal Arch Masonry (also known as "Capitular Masonry") is the first part of the American York Rite system of Masonic degrees. Royal Arch Masons meet as a Chapter, and the Royal Arch Chapter confers four degrees: Mark Master Mason, Past Master, Most Excellent Master, and Royal Arch Mason.

== Constituent degrees ==
Within the York Rite, a Royal Arch Chapter works the following degrees:

1. The Mark Master Mason degree is in some respects an extension of the Fellowcraft or Second degree. In some jurisdictions the degree is conferred in a lodge of Fellowcraft Masons, that is, the Second degree of the Blue Lodge.
2. The Past Master (Virtual) degree is conferred because of the traditional requirement that only Past Masters of a Blue Lodge could be admitted to Royal Arch Masonry. Because there are so many applicants for this degree, Virtual Past Master is required to qualify them for it. Much of the work is the same given to install the Worshipful Master of a Blue Lodge. There is no such requirement or procedure outside the United States. In Pennsylvania, this degree is under the jurisdiction of the Grand Lodge of Pennsylvania and is conferred only to newly elected Masters of Symbolic Lodges.
3. In the Most Excellent Master degree the building of King Solomon's Temple, which figures so prominently in Blue Lodge, has been completed. In England and Wales, the degree is conferred by Cryptic Councils, along with three other degrees (see below).
4. The Royal Arch Mason degree is said by many to be the most beautiful degree in all of Freemasonry. Freemasons who reach this degree may continue to Cryptic Masonry or go straight to Knights Templar (where permitted—requirements vary in different jurisdictions).
5. Honorary Degrees of Valor.

== Administrative organization ==
=== Chapter level ===
A Royal Arch Chapter is in many ways the same as a Lodge; it has officers and a ritual degree system, which in this case consists of four degrees: Mark Master Mason, Past Master (in some jurisdictions the degree is named Virtual Past Master, to distinguish those who have taken this degree in a Royal Arch Chapter from those who were installed as a Worshipful Master in a lodge), Most Excellent Master, and Royal Arch Mason. However, unlike Lodges, the titles of the Officers change depending on the degree being conferred:

Mark Master Mason	(Virtual) Past Master	Most Excellent Master	Royal Arch Mason
Master	Master	Master	High Priest
Senior Warden	Senior Warden	Senior Warden	King
Junior Warden	Junior Warden	none	Scribe
Treasurer	Treasurer	Treasurer	Treasurer
Secretary	Secretary	Secretary	Secretary
Chaplain	Chaplain	Chaplain	Chaplain
Marshal	Marshal	Marshal	Captain of the Host
Senior Deacon	Senior Deacon	Senior Deacon	Principal Sojourner
Junior Deacon	Junior Deacon	Junior Deacon	Royal Arch Captain
Master Overseer	none	none	Master of the Third Veil
Senior Overseer	none	none	Master of the Second Veil
Junior Overseer	none	none	Master of the First Veil
Tyler	Tyler	Tyler	Sentinel

=== Jurisdictional level ===
Every US state has a Grand Chapter, which performs the same administrative functions for its subordinate Chapters as a Grand Lodge does for its subordinate Lodges. In other countries there are either national or state Grand Chapters. The Chapter also has its own equivalents of Grand Lodge Officers, modified from the titles of the officers of a Royal Arch Chapter:

- Grand High Priest
- Deputy Grand High Priest
- Grand King
- Grand Scribe
- Grand Treasurer
- Grand Secretary
- Grand Chaplain
- Grand Captain of the Host
- Grand Principal Sojourner
- Grand Royal Arch Captain
- Grand Master of the Third Veil
- Grand Master of the Second Veil
- Grand Master of the First Veil
- Grand Sentinel

In jurisdictions that have them, there are also District Deputy Grand High Priests appointed by the Grand High Priest to oversee the districts of the jurisdiction as the representative of the Grand High Priest. Grand Representatives are appointed to keep in contact with their counterparts in other jurisdictions.

Grand Chapters also contribute to specific charities which differ from state to state.

=== General Grand Chapter ===
Many of the Grand Chapters around the world are members of an umbrella group called the General Grand Chapter, founded October 24, 1797. Notable chapters not under this umbrella include the U.S. grand chapters of Massachusetts, Ohio, Pennsylvania, Texas, Virginia and West Virginia. The General Grand Chapter publishes a quarterly magazine called Royal Arch Mason and supports Royal Arch Research Assistance, a charity dedicated to researching CAPD or Central Auditory Processing Disorder.

== History of the Chapter degrees ==
The exact origins of the four Chapter degrees in its current form as part of the York Rite are unknown.

=== Mark Master Mason ===
The degree of a Mark Master Mason is seen as an extension of the Fellowcraft Degree. It originated in England, and is believed to have entered the York Rite via immigrants to America from Scotland and Palestine.

The first record of the Mark degree is in 1769, when Thomas Dunckerley, as Provincial Grand Superintendent, conferred the degrees of Mark Mason and Mark Master at a Royal Arch Chapter in Portsmouth, England.

In Ireland, the degree of Mark Master Mason is still required to join a Royal Arch Chapter. A Royal Arch Chapter meets as a Mark Lodge, confers the Mark Degree on a candidate making him eligible to become a Royal Arch Mason at a subsequent meeting. A Mark Lodge and a Royal Arch Chapter share the same Warrant within the Irish system.

In Scotland, the Mark Degree is still conferred in a Craft lodge. The degree may also be conferred in a Holy Royal Arch Chapter as a prerequisite for exaltation to the Holy Royal Arch. If a candidate for joining a Scottish Royal Arch Chapter has received the Mark Degree in his Craft Lodge, then he will affiliate to the Mark Lodge belonging to the Chapter before proceeding to the Excellent Master and then Royal Arch Degrees.

=== Past Master (Virtual) ===
The April 30, 1793 minutes of St. Andrew's Royal Arch Chapter state that the so-called Excellent degree may have become the Past master's degree, and that a similar degree by that name was conferred in 1790 by King Cyrus Chapter in Newburyport, Massachusetts.

The Past master's degree was already in existence by 1797, and appears in a few monitors of the era: it is one of the four degrees in the Webb Monitor (1797) and appears in Jeremy Cross' monitor in 1826.

=== Most Excellent Master ===
The Most Excellent master's degree is considered American in origin, although it has been postulated by Ray Denslow and Turnbull that it was merely a rearrangement of preexisting material. They state that the first mention of it by name is when it was conferred on William S. Davis on August 28, 1769, in St. Andrew's Royal Arch Lodge, and that the degrees came from lodges originating from the Irish Constitution.

There was also a "Super Excellent" degree that simply disappeared from the St. Andrew's minutes after December 21, 1797, and it was postulated that it may have become the Most Excellent Master degree, first noted in St. Andrew's minutes on February 21, 1798.

Similarities between this degree and material in the 19° in the Early Grand Rite of Scotland are also enumerated upon, and they conclude that the degree is from that Rite.

=== Royal Arch Mason ===
==== Origins and early development ====
As for the degree of Royal Arch Mason, Turnbull and Denslow contend that "It is the most widely known and talked about degree in the Masonic system" because it had been part of the third degree until the formation of the United Grand Lodge of England. Although glimpses of Royal Arch Masonry vocabulary appear in Masonic literature from the 1720s, the first verifiable appearance of Royal Arch Masonry is in Ireland in the 1740s during a Dublin procession. According to Lodge No. 21's records, the “Royal Arch” was carried in a procession by “two excellent Masons” through Youghal, Ireland, on December 27, 1743. However, the oldest known Chapter in the world is Stirling Rock Royal Arch Chapter No 2 in Scotland, which has worked since 1743.

The degree is also mentioned disapprovingly in Dassigny's "A serious and impartial enquiry into the cause of the present decay of Free-masonry in the Kingdom of Ireland" published in Dublin in 1744. Separate notes in this work indicate that the rite was practiced in Dublin, London and York, and described it as an "organis'd body of men who have passed the chair" (i.e. served as the Master of a Craft lodge).

In 1749, the Grand Lodge of Ireland issued warrants to Lodges 190 and 198 to establish “Royal Arch Lodges”.

From Ireland, the Royal Arch spread to England, where it fueled the rivalry between the two Craft grand lodges in existence at that time. In 1717 the original Premier Grand Lodge of England had been formed in London to govern Craft Freemasonry in England. From 1751, its claim to represent the whole of English Craft Freemasonry was contested by the Antient Grand Lodge of England. In the ensuing debate, the newer grand lodge became known as the "Antients", while the older was referred to as the "Moderns". In 1746, Laurence Dermott, later the Grand Secretary of the "Antients", had been accepted into a Royal Arch Chapter in Dublin, which at that time was open only to those who had previously served as master of a Craft lodge. He regarded the Royal Arch as the fourth degree of Craft Masonry. Under his influence, the "Antients" championed the Royal Arch degree in England, while it was met with hostility in the "Moderns". At the beginning of the 19th century, when the "Antients" and the "Moderns" moved from rivalry towards union, the role and purpose of the Royal Arch became a sticking point. The "Antients" viewed the Royal Arch as a fourth degree of Craft Freemasonry and worked it as part of the Craft ceremonies, while the "Moderns" held that Craft Freemasonry consisted of three degrees only and that the Royal Arch was at the most an extension of the third (Master Mason's) degree which was to be administered separately. When the "Antients" and "Moderns" merged in 1813 to form the United Grand Lodge of England, this was possible only after reaching a compromise on the role and purpose of Royal Arch Masonry. After the union, the "Supreme Order of the Holy Royal Arch" would be fully recognized by the United Grand Lodge, but become a separate order with all Craft Lodges permitted to work the ceremony. In its Book of Constitutions, the United Grand Lodge of England declared that "...pure Antient Masonry consists of three degrees and no more, viz. those of the Entered Apprentice, the Fellow Craft, and the Master Mason including the Supreme Order of the Holy Royal Arch." In 1823, the United Grand Lodge of England allowed Master Masons to join Holy Royal Arch Chapters without having previously passed through the chair of a Craft lodge. In Freemasonry in Scotland, a candidate for the Royal Arch must also be a Mark Master Mason, a degree which can be conferred within a Royal Arch Chapter if required.

==== History in the United States ====
In Northern America, freemasons until the end of the 18th century performed Royal Arch ceremonies as well as some others that are now more familiarly part of Knights Templar and the Red Cross of Constantine.

In Virginia and West Virginia, there is no separate Cryptic Council. The Cryptic Degrees are given under the Royal Arch Chapter.

Fredericksburg Lodge in Virginia lists a conferral of the Royal Arch degree on December 22, 1753. There is also a Royal Arch Chapter noted in 1769 in Massachusetts (St. Andrew's Royal Arch Chapter in Boston, then known as Royall Arch Lodge), where the first Knights Templar degree was also conferred. Through a report compiled by the Committee on History and Research appointed by the Grand Chapter of Massachusetts in 1953 and 1954, it was found that St. Andrew's Royal Arch Chapter was the oldest Chapter in the Western Hemisphere by date of constitution, having been officially constituted April 9, 1769, though the records implied that the Chapter had been working prior to that date, and perhaps as early as 1762. The report also states that it is unknown whether the Fredericksburg Lodge in Virginia conferred only the Royal Arch degree or the entire series of degrees. Pennsylvania, however, claims to have the oldest extant Royal Arch Chapter in the world. Royal Arch Chapter No. 3, formerly Jerusalem Royal Arch Chapter No. 3, and before that Royal Arch Lodge No. 3, has complete minutes going back as far as December 3, 1767. The minutes from this date mention approving the minutes from the previous meeting. This Chapter began meeting under the authority of the Grand Lodge of England (Antients) and it is believed that the Chapter was constituted around 1758, but this date has yet to be proven. It currently works under a renewed warrant from 1780. The Grand Chapter of Pennsylvania claims to be the first Royal Arch Grand Chapter in North America and was formed on November 23, 1795, by the Grand Lodge of Pennsylvania, while the first Chapter in the southern states was constituted in 1855 (like the State of the Indiana) and in 1876.

After the independence of the American Colonies in 1776, Freemasonry in the United States remained relatively little influenced by the rivalry between the "Antients" and "Moderns" in England. In 1797, a group of Royal Arch masons met in Hartford to try to establish some sort of governing body for degrees that were largely conferred in the New England states, which became the Grand Chapter of the Northern States, and later was broken down into the state-by-state Grand Chapter system. This body later became the General Grand Chapter, Royal Arch Masons International.

On 10 November 2004, the Grand Chapter of the Holy Royal Arch in England declared the Royal Arch to be a separate degree in its own right, albeit the natural progression from the third degree, and the completion of "pure, antient Masonry", which consists of the three Craft degrees and the Royal Arch. Following this decision by the Grand Chapter in 2004, there are currently significant ritual differences between Royal Arch Masonry as worked in England and Royal Arch Masonry worked as part of the York Rite in the U.S. Fraternal inter-relations remain as before.

==== History in Canada ====
Royal Arch Masonry in Canada has strong ties to the UK since Canada is a Commonwealth country. Recent changes to the Holy Royal Arch in the UK, did not necessarily occur in Canada. In most Chapters in Canada the Past master's degree is not worked, there are only a few exceptions. The degree of the Holy Royal Arch is considered the "completion of the Master Mason's degree" in Lodge – a phrase inherited from England, but which was officially abandoned by the United Grand Lodge of England in 2004. The Officer's titles listed above may differ slightly, and of course the history is different, and more intertwined with that of the British Empire from which it largely grew, there are Chapters that received their charters from the Scottish Grand Chapter and therefore differ in respects..

Also the name of the 3 first principals are not the same as in the USA. The 3rd Principal is referred to as "Joshua", the Assistant High Priest who dedicated the 2nd Temple and is represented by an scepter topped with an Open Book; the 2nd Principal personnifies "Haggai" the Prophet and is represented with a scepter topped with all All-Seeing Eye and the 1st Principal is the representative of "Zerubabbel", Prince and ruler in Israel and bears a scepter topped with a Crown.
