= Ray Denslow =

American historian (1885–1960)

Ray V. Denslow
- Born: March 6, 1885; Spickard, Missouri
- Died: September 10, 1960 (aged 75)
- Known for: Author

Ray Vaughn Denslow (1885–1960) was an author, poet, and historian of Freemasonry. Ray was noted for many different pieces of writing including that of I Am Freemasonry. His other books include A Handbook for Royal Arch Masons, Masonic Rites and Degrees, The Masonic World, and Freemasonry in the Western Hemisphere. Ray was a former Grand Master of the Grand Lodge of Missouri.

== Early life ==
Ray Vaughn Denslow, born March 6, 1885, grew up in Spickard, Missouri and attended Blees Military Academy and the University of Missouri. He married Clara Alice Merrifield on June 8, 1907, and they had one son, William Ray Denslow.

== Career ==
Denslow was the editor of the Trenton News and then later joined the United States Postal Service. He became a Master Mason in Trenton Lodge, No. 11, on June 20, 1912, and later became extremely active in Freemasonry, joining many organizations including Royal Arch Masonry, DeMolay International, Royal and Select Masters, Knights Templars, Red Cross of Constantine, and Scottish Rite.

== Death ==
Denslow died on September 10, 1960.

== See also ==
- Masonic appendant bodies
