= Holy Royal Arch =

Degree of Freemasonry

The Triple Tau. (Grand Emblem of Royal Arch Masonry)

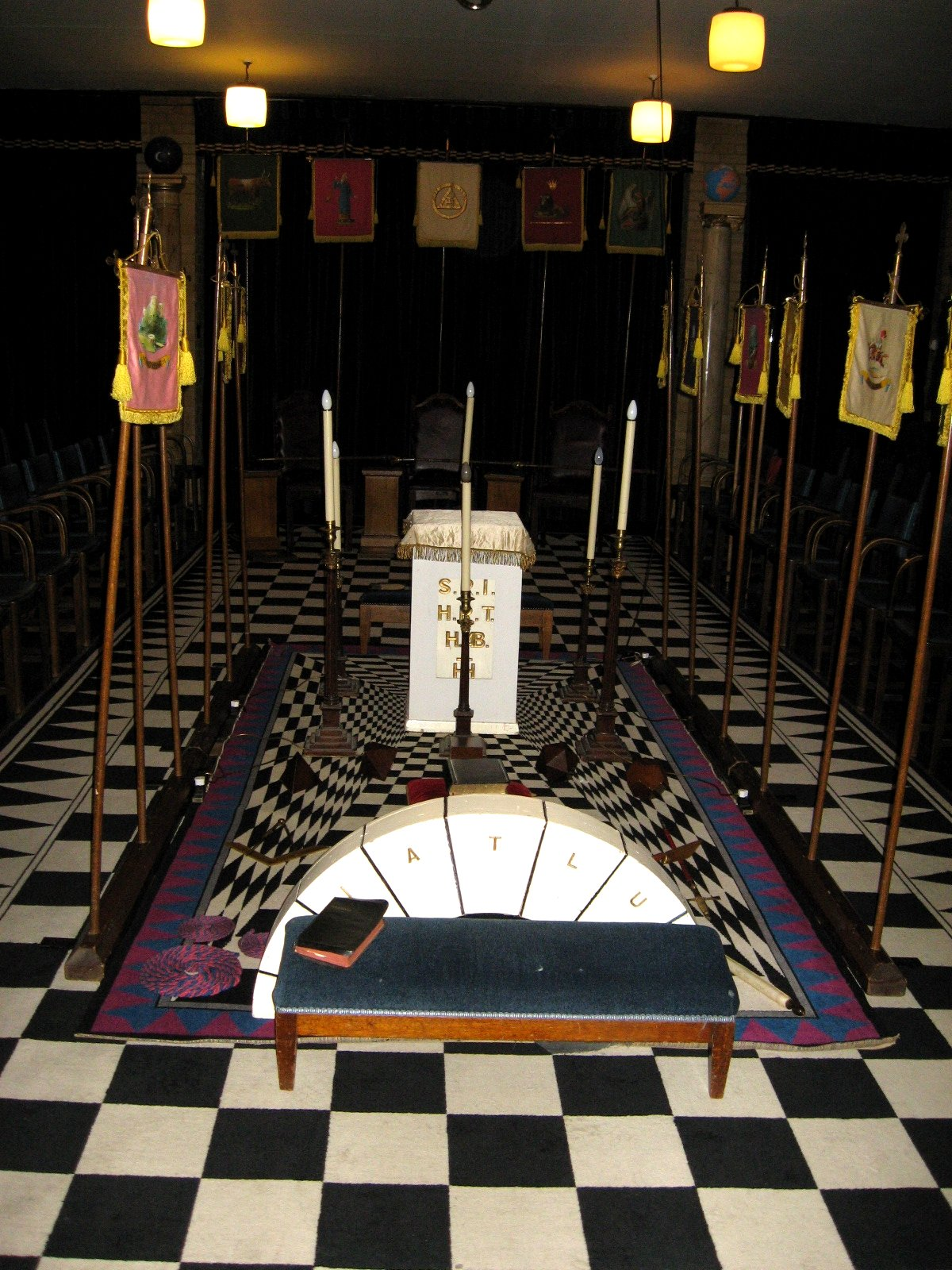
A lodge room set out for use by a Royal Arch Chapter

Apron of a Royal Arch Mason under the English Masonic Constitution

The Royal Arch is a degree of Freemasonry. The Royal Arch is present in all main masonic systems, though in some it is worked as part of Craft ('mainstream') Freemasonry, and in others in an appendant ('additional') order. Royal Arch Masons meet as a Chapter; in the Supreme Order of the Royal Arch as practised in the British Isles, much of Europe and the Commonwealth, Chapters confer the single degree of Royal Arch Mason.

== Membership ==
In the British Isles, most of continental Europe (including the masonically expanding states of eastern Europe), and most nations of the Commonwealth (with the notable exception of Canada), the teachings of Royal Arch Masonry are contained in the "Supreme Order of the Holy Royal Arch" – a stand-alone degree of Freemasonry which is open to those who have completed the three Craft degrees. Until 1823, only freemasons who had previously been the Worshipful Master of a Craft lodge were allowed to join. Today, candidates for an English Royal Arch Chapter are required to have been a Master Mason for four weeks or more.

In Freemasonry in Scotland, the candidate for the Royal Arch must also be a Mark Master Mason, a degree which is part of the Royal Arch series. It can be worked in the Chapter, or more often has been worked in a Scottish Lodge. After the Mark degree, a candidate must receive the Excellent master's degree, before being exalted to the Royal Arch degree. In Ireland a candidate must be a Master Mason for one year before being admitted as a member of a Royal Arch Chapter. The Degree of Mark Master Mason is taken separately first and only then can the Royal Arch Degree be taken.

In the United States, Canada, Brazil, Israel, Mexico, Paraguay and the Philippines, the Royal Arch is not worked as a stand-alone degree as described above, but forms part of the York Rite system of additional Masonic degrees. Royal Arch Masons in the York Rite also meet as a Chapter, but the Royal Arch Chapter of the York Rite confers four different degrees: 'Mark Master Mason', 'Virtual Past Master', 'Most Excellent Master', and 'Royal Arch Mason'. While the York Rite degree of 'Royal Arch Mason' is roughly comparable to the Supreme Order of the Royal Arch as practised in England and Wales, the other degrees may have equivalents in other appendant orders.

The Royal Arch is also the subject of the 13th and 14th degrees of the Scottish Rite of Freemasonry (called "Ancient and Accepted Rite" in England and Wales).

== Purpose and teaching ==
Similarly to Craft Freemasonry, the Royal Arch conveys moral and ethical lessons. In the three degrees of the Craft, the candidate is presented with a series of practical principles of service to his fellow man and begins journey of self discovery. The Royal Arch completes this journey by developing this latter aspect. In the Chapter, the teachings of the Royal Arch are conveyed using a ritualised allegory based on the Old Testament telling of the return to Jerusalem from the Babylonian captivity to rebuild the City and Temple. In clearing the ground of Solomon's Temple for the foundations of a new temple, the candidate makes important discoveries. By adding a further explanation to the practical lessons of Craft Freemasonry, the Royal Arch is seen as an extension of the preceding degrees and the philosophical lessons conveyed are appropriate to that stage in a candidate's Masonic development. The symbol or Grand Emblem of Royal Arch Masonry is the Triple Tau.

== History ==
=== Origins ===
The exact origins of Royal Arch Masonry in general, and of the Royal Arch in particular, are unknown except that it dates back to the mid 18th century.

Although glimpses of Royal Arch vocabulary appear in Masonic literature from the 1720s, the first verifiable appearance of Royal Arch Masonry is in Ireland in the 1740s during a Dublin procession. According to Lodge No. 21's records, the “Royal Arch” was carried in a procession by “two excellent Masons” through Youghal, Ireland, on 27 December 1743.

The degree is also mentioned disapprovingly in Dassigny's "A serious and impartial enquiry into the cause of the present decay of Free-masonry in the Kingdom of Ireland" published in Dublin in 1744. Separate notes in this work indicate that the rite was practised in Dublin, London and York, and described it as an "organis'd body of men who have passed the chair" (i.e. served as the Master of a Craft lodge).

In 1749, the Grand Lodge of Ireland issued warrants to Lodges 190 and 198 to establish "Royal Arch Lodges".

=== England and Wales ===
==== "Antients" vs. "Moderns" ====
In 18th century England, the role and purpose of Royal Arch Masonry was the subject of a long debate between the two rival umbrella organisations of Freemasonry. In 1717, four Craft lodges had formed the original Premier Grand Lodge of England to govern Freemasonry as practiced in England. From 1751, this claim was contested by another group of Craft lodges which formed the Antient Grand Lodge of England. In the ensuing debate, the newer grand lodge became known for short as the "Antients", while the older grand lodge was referred to as the "Moderns".

In 1746, Laurence Dermott, who would later become Grand Secretary of the "Antients", had been accepted into a Royal Arch Chapter in Dublin, which at that time was open only to those who had previously served as master of a Craft lodge. He regarded the Royal Arch as the fourth degree of Craft Masonry. Under his influence, the "Antients" championed the Royal Arch degree in England, while it was met with hostility in the Premier Grand Lodge of England.

In 1764, a lodge of Scottish masons attached to the "Antients" switched sides and became the Caledonian Lodge attached to the "Moderns". The next year, they assisted in setting up a Royal Arch Chapter admitting masons from other Craft lodges which were attached to the "Moderns". In 1766, with the exaltation of Lord Blayney, the Grand Master of the "Moderns", this organisation became known as the "Excellent Grand and Royal Arch Chapter", taking on administrative responsibilities and thus becoming the first Grand Chapter in England. At the same time, James Heseltine, the Grand Secretary of the "Moderns", stated about Royal Arch Masonry that "It is part of Masonry but has no connection with Grand Lodge" in a letter to a senior German mason. He was also one of the signatories on the charter establishing the first Grand Chapter. The minutes of the first meeting of Grand Chapter show that it met in the Turks Head, in the London district of Soho, the same tavern that had shortly before hosted the birth of the Antient Grand Lodge of England. On this occasion, Thomas Dunckerley was elected to hold the office of Z (head officer of the Chapter) in the absence of the Grand Master and Deputy Grand Master. He was later appointed Grand Superintendent and promoted Royal Arch Masonry in the provincial lodges of the "Moderns" with considerable energy and success.

In 1774, the "Antients" formed their own Royal Arch Grand Chapter upon Laurence Dermott's instigation. Its members were Grand Lodge officers who happened to hold the Royal Arch degree, its meetings were ordained by Grand Lodge, and its proceedings approved by that same body.

By the end of the 18th century, both Craft grand lodges thus had developed a different organisational approach to the Royal Arch. While the Grand Chapter of the "Moderns" was independent from their Craft Grand Lodge out of necessity, the Grand Chapter of the "Antients" was closely tied to the corresponding Craft Grand Lodge. For the masons organised in the "Antients", the Royal Arch became recognised as the fourth degree, open to those who had served as a master of a Craft Lodge. For the "Antients", Grand Chapter was little more than a cipher, registering names and processing admission fees. Effective governance of the Royal Arch degree rested with the Grand Lodge and the individual Craft lodges that also worked this fourth degree.

==== Uniting the two grand lodges ====
At the beginning of the 19th century, when the "Antients" and the "Moderns" moved from rivalry towards union, the role and purpose of the Royal Arch became a sticking point. The "Antients" viewed the Royal Arch as a fourth degree of Craft Freemasonry and worked it as part of the Craft ceremonies, while the "Moderns" almost totally ignored it. The latter held the opinion that Craft Freemasonry consisted of three degrees only and that the Royal Arch was at the most an extension of the third (Master Mason's) degree which was to be administered separately. In addition, the "Moderns" embedded certain teachings in their third degree ritual that the "Antients" only revealed to those joining the Royal Arch.

In 1813, the "Antients" and "Moderns" agreed on an Act of Union and formed the United Grand Lodge of England. This was possible only after reaching a compromise on the role and purpose of Royal Arch Masonry. The compromise was that after the union, the Royal Arch degree would be fully recognised by the United Grand Lodge (to placate the "Antients"), but become a separate order (to placate the "Moderns") while all Craft Lodges would be given sanction to work the ceremony (to placate the "Antients"). At the same time, no compromise could be reached on the role and purpose of the Mark degree. It was effectively proscribed from the Union until the 1850s, until it became organised in an independent Grand Lodge of Mark Master Masons of England and Wales. In most countries outside England and Wales, however, Mark Masonry became attached to Royal Arch chapters. In its Book of Constitutions, the United Grand Lodge of England therefore declared that "...pure Antient Masonry consists of three degrees and no more, viz. those of the Entered Apprentice, the Fellow Craft, and the Master Mason including the Supreme Order of the Royal Arch.".

In 1817, four years after the "Antients" and "Moderns" had united their Craft grand lodges, the new United Grand Lodge oversaw the formation of a "Supreme Grand Chapter of Royal Arch Masons of England" to govern the Royal Arch in England and Wales. By that time, the Grand Chapter of the "Antients" had effectively ceased to exist (only a few meetings are recorded for the time after 1813), so their remaining members were simply absorbed into what had previously been the Grand Chapter of the "Moderns".

Another significant constitutional development in English Royal Arch Masonry occurred in 1823, when Master Masons were allowed to join Royal Arch Chapters without having previously passed through the chair of a Craft lodge. In 1835, the ritual was reformed, when part of the ceremony known as "Passing the Veils" was dropped. It was re-adopted by Bristol Chapters at the turn of the 20th century.

==== Development since the union ====
While the Act of Union of 1813 recognised the Supreme Order of the Royal Arch as part of "pure, antient masonry", the wording in the United Grand Lodge of England's Book of Constitutions that "...pure Antient Masonry consists of three degrees and no more, viz. those of the Entered Apprentice, the Fellow Craft, and the Master Mason including the Supreme Order of the Royal Arch" was subsequently often interpreted to suggest that the Royal Arch was not an additional degree, but merely the completion of the Master Mason degree. That view was so widely held among freemasons in England and Wales that in the Royal Arch ritual the newly exalted candidate was informed that he must not think that he had taken a fourth degree but that he had in fact completed his third. (Statements to this effect can on occasion still be found today, e.g. "When a Freemason has attained the rank of a Master Mason he is then entitled [...] to be exalted into a Royal Arch Chapter in order to complete fully his Master Mason's Degree.") While expressing a compromise position between the traditional views of the "Antients" and "Moderns", this interpretation put the Royal Arch in opposition to masonic practice in most countries outside England and Wales. No other masonic constitution ever claimed that the Third Degree and the Royal Arch are two parts of a single whole. The Supreme Grand Chapter of Royal Arch Masons of England eventually questioned its own reasoning.

In December 2003, the United Grand Lodge of England acknowledged and pronounced the status of the Supreme Order of the Royal Arch to be "an extension to, but neither a superior nor a subordinate part of, the degrees which precede it". On 10 November 2004, after deliberations by a special working party, the Supreme Grand Chapter of Royal Arch Masons of England at its regular meeting in London formally overturned the compromise position of 1813, and declared the Royal Arch to be a separate degree in its own right and the completion of "pure ancient Masonry", which consists of the three Craft degrees and the Royal Arch. Words in the ritual which propounded the earlier compromise position and led to misinterpretations were removed by mandatory regulation. The official position of the Supreme Grand Chapter today is that the "Royal Arch is the continuation of Craft Freemasonry" as taught in the three degrees of Entered Apprentice, Fellow Craft, and Master Mason; in that sense, ""pure ancient Masonry" can be seen as a journey of self-knowledge and discovery."

=== North America ===
According to Ray Denslow Until the end of the 18th century, Masonic Lodges in North America performed Royal Arch ceremonies, as well as some others that are now more familiarly part of Knights Templar and the Red Cross of Constantine.

Fredericksburg Lodge in Virginia lists a conferral of the Royal Arch degree on 22 December 1753. There is also a Royal Arch Chapter noted in 1769 in Massachusetts (St. Andrew's Royal Arch Chapter in Boston, then known as Royall Arch Lodge), where the first Knights Templar degree was also conferred. Through a report compiled by the Committee on History and Research appointed by the Grand Chapter of Massachusetts in 1953 and 1954, it was found that St. Andrew's Royal Arch Chapter was the oldest constituted Chapter in the Western Hemisphere, having been officially constituted 9 April 1769, though the records implied that the Chapter had been working prior to that date, and perhaps as early as 1762. The report also states that it is unknown whether the Fredericksburg Lodge in Virginia conferred only the degree of 'Royal Arch Mason' or the entire series of American Capitular Masonry degrees.

Pennsylvania, on the other hand, claims to have the oldest extant Royal Arch Chapter in the world. Royal Arch Chapter No. 3 (formerly Jerusalem Royal Arch Chapter No. 3, and before that Royal Arch Lodge No. 3) has complete minutes going back as far as 3 December 1767. (The minutes from this date mention approving the minutes from the previous meeting.) This chapter began meeting under the authority of the Grand Lodge of England (Ancients) and it is believed that the chapter was constituted around 1758, but this date has yet to be proven. The Grand Chapter of Pennsylvania is the first Royal Arch Grand Chapter in North America and was formed on 23 November 1795 by the Grand Lodge of Pennsylvania.

After the independence of the American Colonies in 1776, Freemasonry in the United States remained relatively little influenced by the rivalry between the "Antients" and "Moderns" in England. In 1797, a group of Royal Arch masons met in Hartford to try to establish some sort of governing body for degrees that were largely conferred in the New England states, which became the Grand Chapter of the Northern States, and later was broken down into the state-by-state Grand Chapter system. This body later became the General Grand Chapter, Royal Arch Masons International.

In the United States and in Canada, the teachings of the Royal Arch as practised in England and Wales are mainly contained in the degree of 'Royal Arch Mason', which is now one of four degrees worked by Royal Arch Chapters in the York Rite.

== Role within different masonic constitutions ==
The Royal Arch is affiliated to many different masonic constitutions worldwide, many of which place different emphasis on the order.

=== England, Europe and Australasia ===
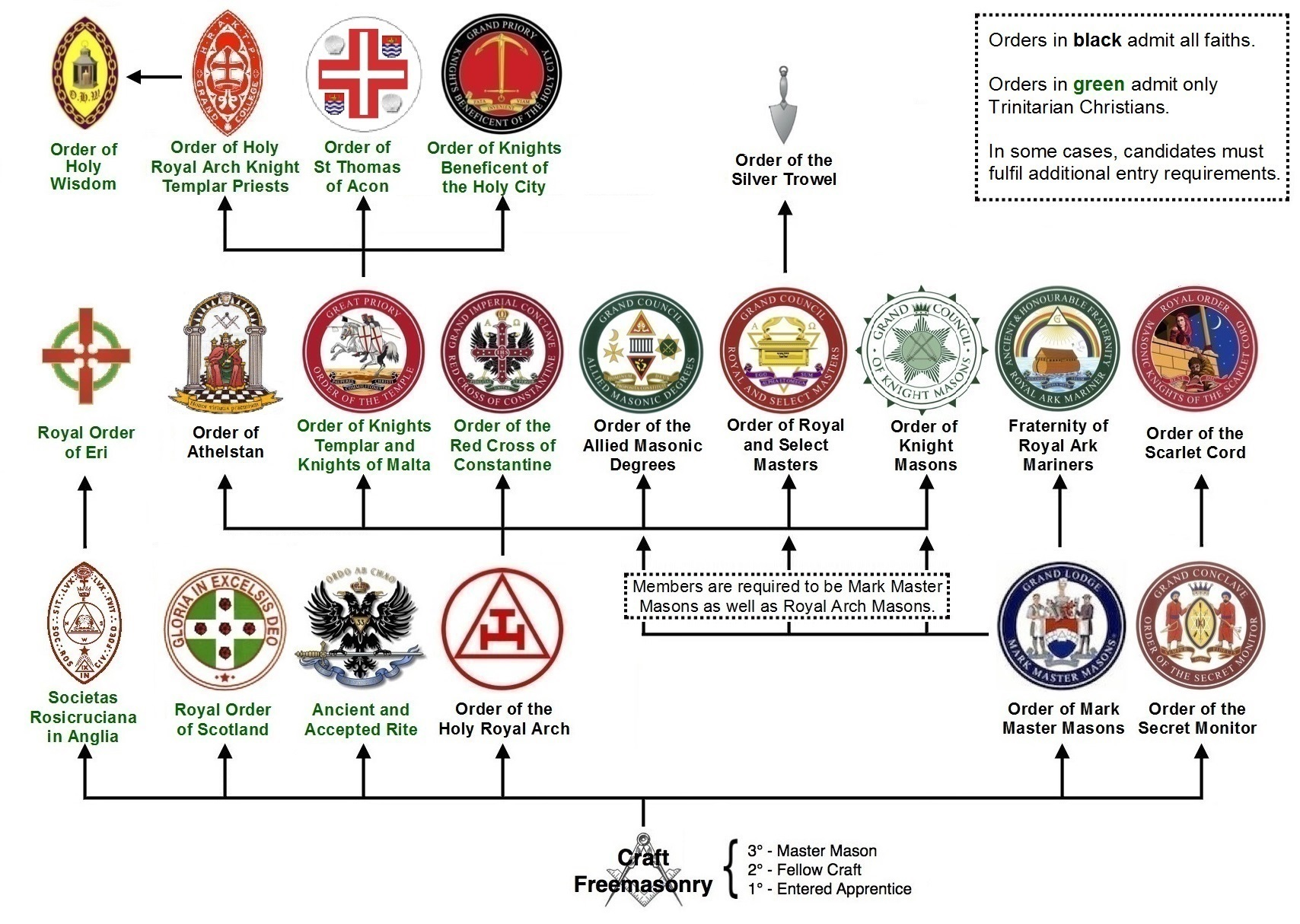
The position of the Royal Arch among the Masonic appendant bodies in England and Wales

The English system of Royal Arch Masonry consists of a single appendant order, which works four ceremonies: the exaltation ceremony to bring in new members and an installation ceremony for each of the three Principals.

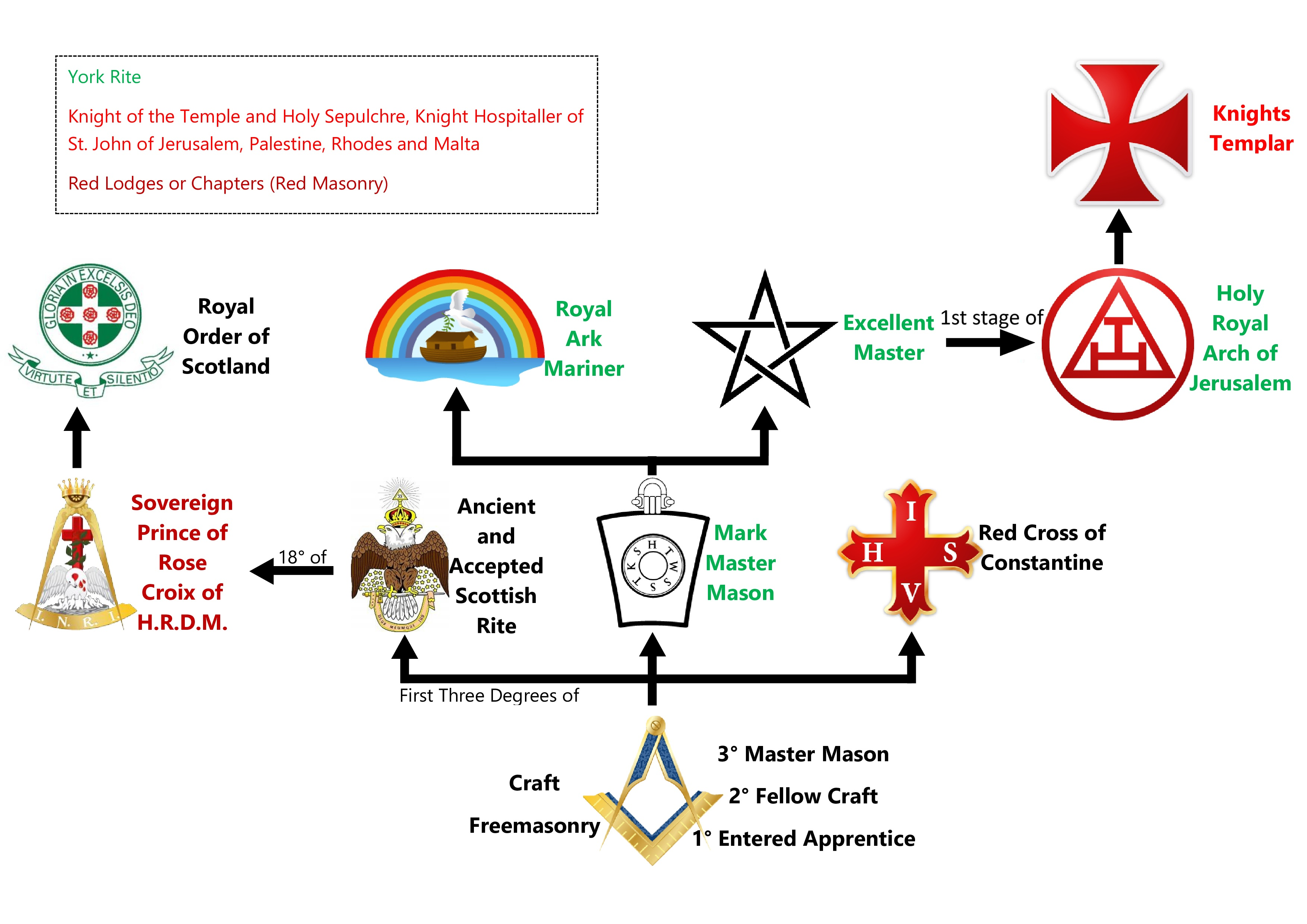
Position of the Holy Royal Arch among the Allied Degrees of British Le Droit Humain, note that the British Federation, like the Grand Lodge of Scotland, uses the Excellent master's degree before someone joins the HRA

In England and Wales, a Royal Arch Chapter is required to be sponsored by a Craft lodge and bears the same number. In nearly all cases, a Royal Arch Chapter also bears the same name as its sponsoring Craft lodge, although the Royal Arch itself is a separate order from Craft Freemasonry. Craft lodges in England and Wales normally have a specially appointed Royal Arch Representative, and newly raised Master Masons are actively encouraged to seek exaltation into the Royal Arch before considering membership of any further Masonic organisation. This is in contrast to the experience of British members of Le Droit Humain, who must first be a Mark Master Mason.

With the exception of Scotland and Scandinavia (where Swedish rite is used), the English system of Royal Arch Masonry is also found in other European states, as well as in Australasia, and is currently being introduced to many eastern European states, including Russia and Serbia. Due to the difference in organisation, notable restrictions apply to English members of the Royal Arch who wish to attend Royal Arch meetings in Scotland (see below).

=== Scotland ===
In Scotland, the degree is conferred in a Royal Arch Chapter which is organised within a wholly different administrative structure, the "Supreme Grand Royal Arch Chapter of Scotland". This body administers Mark Masonry, Royal Arch Masonry, and the degree of Excellent Master which is an essential preamble to the Royal Arch degree.

English Royal Arch Masons will not be allowed into a Scottish chapter during a Mark working, unless they also hold that degree, which in England is administered by a separate body. The Excellent Master degree does not exist in England, and members of the English Grand Chapter are not permitted to attend these workings. They may also be excluded from part of the Royal Arch working which they no longer use, although this is at the discretion of individual chapters.

These restrictions do not apply to members of Royal Arch chapters in Ireland, Australia, New Zealand, and North America. The position of the Bristol chapters, which re-assimilated "Passing the Veils" (similar to the Excellent Masters working), is unclear.

=== Ireland ===
The Royal Arch degree under the Irish Constitution is unique, and while perfectly regular and recognised, it bears little resemblance to the same degree in the sister Constitutions of England and Scotland.

The Royal Arch Degree under the Irish Constitution contains a legend based on the renovation of the First Temple under King Josiah, not the rebuilding of the second. The legend in this form has been worked under the Irish Constitution since 1864. The elaborate "Passing of the Veils" ceremony is essential to the Royal Arch Degree in the Irish system and after it is completed it is followed immediately by the Royal Arch degree itself, containing the story of the restoration of Solomon's Temple under King Josiah. The three presiding officers of a Royal Arch Chapter in Ireland are called the Excellent King, High Priest and Chief Scribe (not First, Second and Third Principal as in England and Wales). The Sojourners and Scribes were replaced by the 'Royal Arch Captain', the 'Captain of the Scarlet Veil', the 'Captain of the Purple Veil' and the 'Captain of the Blue Veil'. Although not referred to as such in the ritual, the three principals are taken to be King Josiah, the High Priest Hilkiah and the scribe Shaphan.

Irish Royal Arch Chapters are also permitted to meet as Lodges of Mark Master Masons, and these are governed by the Supreme Grand Royal Arch Chapter of Ireland.

=== Northern Europe ===
The Swedish rite Freemasonry which is practiced in Sweden, Norway, Denmark, Iceland and partly in Finland, Germany, Estonia and Latvia is a progressive system, divided into three divisions. The second division, the St. Andrews Lodge, has some similarities to Royal Arch, and VI degree masons under Swedish rite and Royal Arch masons share some symbolism and will have a common understanding.

=== North America and other countries ===
In the United States, Canada, Brazil, Israel, Mexico, Paraguay, Philippines (and others), the teachings of Royal Arch Masonry are not worked as a stand-alone degree, but form part of the York Rite system of additional Masonic degrees. Royal Arch Chapters of the York Rite administer the degrees of 'Mark Master Mason', 'Virtual Past Master', 'Most Excellent Master' and 'Royal Arch Mason'. Of these four degrees, only the latter bears resemblance to the Supreme Order of the Royal Arch as practised in England and Wales. In Canada, most jurisdictions do not formally practice or confer the degree of 'Virtual Past Master', although it is known to be made available as a group ceremony for members attending a Grand Chapter Convocation.

== Administrative structure ==
=== Chapter level ===
Once accepted into a Chapter, the Royal Arch equivalent of a Craft lodge, a candidate becomes a Companion, with Royal Arch meetings being described as a convocation. The ceremony in which a Master Mason is advanced to Companion is called Exaltation. Royal Arch Chapters are governed by three Principals, who conjointly rule the Chapter, sitting together in the east of the assembly.

In addition to the three Principals, who rule conjointly, a Royal Arch Chapter has elected and appointed officers with individual responsibilities within the Chapter. Similar offices exist at the Supreme Grand Chapter (national) level, and also at the intermediate level (Metropolitan, Provincial, or District), with appropriate prefixes to the titles.

- Zerubbabel – Prince of Jerusalem
- Haggai – the Prophet
- Joshua or Jeshua – the High Priest
- Scribe Ezra
- Scribe Nehemiah
- Treasurer
- Director of Ceremonies
- Principal Sojourner
- 1st Assistant Sojourner
- 2nd Assistant Sojourner
- Assistant Director of Ceremonies
- Organist
- Steward (there may be several Stewards)
- Janitor

All of these offices are listed in, and regulated by, the constitutions or regulations of the various national Grand Chapters, including those of the 'mother' Grand Chapter, the Supreme Grand Chapter of England. Within the 'York Rite' version of Royal Arch Freemasonry the Janitor may be known as the Tyler or Sentinel.

In Scotland, the Principal and Assistant Sojourners are replaced by 1st Sojourner, 2nd Sojourner and 3rd Sojourner. The 3rd Sojourner acts rather like the Inner/Inside Guard of a Craft Lodge. It is usual for the 3rd Principal (Joshua) to work the affiliation to the Mark Lodge within the Chapter, and the 2nd Principal (Haggai) to work the Excellent master's degree. Similarly, in some Scottish Chapters, the 2nd Sojourner will conduct the candidate through the Excellent master's degree, whilst the 1st Sojourner conducts the candidate through the Royal Arch Degree. If the Mark Degree is worked in a Chapter, it is often the Craft Lodge office-bearers (who are Royal Arch Masons) who take their usual lodge role, since they are most used to it.

=== Regional level ===
In England and Wales, Royal Arch Chapters are grouped on a regional level as either a 'Metropolitan area' or 'Provinces' (based on the old Counties), while Chapters overseas are grouped in Districts. These Metropolitan, Provincial, and District Grand Chapters are ruled over by a 'Grand Superintendent' who is appointed by the 'First Grand Principal' (see below) as his personal representative for the particular area. Every 'Grand Superintendent' is usually assisted by a Deputy, and always rules conjointly with a 'Second Provincial Grand Principal' and a 'Third Provincial Grand Principal' (the word 'Provincial' being replaced with the word 'Metropolitan' in a Metropolitan Area such as London, or the word 'District' in an overseas area controlled from England). In many cases, the men acting as regional dignitaries in the Royal Arch will also be holding the equivalent regional offices in Craft Freemasonry.

=== Supreme Grand Chapter ===
The Supreme Grand Chapter of Royal Arch Masons of England is governed from the headquarters of the United Grand Lodge of England in Freemasons' Hall, London. The Supreme Grand Chapter is ruled by three Grand Principals, who have their headquarters . The 'First Grand Principal' is the Royal Arch equivalent of the Grand Master in Craft Freemasonry. If the holder of this office is a Royal Prince, as is currently the case, he is supported by a 'Pro First Grand Principal'. As at regional level, many officers of Grand Lodge hold the equivalent office in the Supreme Grand Chapter.

== See also ==
- Masonic appendant bodies
