= Knights Templar (Freemasonry) =

Fraternal order affiliated with Freemasonry

A cross and crown laid upon a cross pattée inscribed with "In Hoc Signo Vinces" resting upon downward pointing swords in saltire is often used to represent the Knights Templar. The various symbols used allude to the orders of the body, though the cross and crown is often used alone as well.

The Knights Templar, full name The United Religious, Military and Masonic Orders of the Temple and of St John of Jerusalem, Palestine, Rhodes and Malta, is a fraternal order affiliated with Freemasonry. Unlike the initial degrees conferred in a regular Masonic Lodge, which (in most Regular Masonic jurisdictions) only require a belief in a Supreme Being regardless of religious affiliation, the Knights Templar is one of several additional Masonic Orders in which membership is open only to Freemasons who profess a belief in Christianity. One of the obligations entrants to the order are required to declare is to protect and defend the Christian faith. The word "United" in its full title indicates that more than one historical tradition and more than one actual order are jointly controlled within this system. The individual orders 'united' within this system are principally the Knights of the Temple (Knights Templar), the Knights of Malta, the Knights of St Paul, and only within the York Rite, the Knights of the Red Cross.

Like the Masonic Red Cross of Constantine being inspired by the Sacred Military Constantinian Order of Saint George and the Order of Malta being inspired by the Sovereign Military Order of Malta, the Masonic order of Knights Templar derives its name from the medieval Catholic military order Knights Templar. However, it does not claim any direct lineal descent from the original Templar order.

== History ==
=== Knightly symbolism in Freemasonry ===
The earliest documented link between Freemasonry and the Crusades is the 1737 oration of the Chevalier Ramsay. He claimed, without supporting historical evidence, that European Freemasonry came about from an interaction between 'crusader masons' and the Knights Hospitaller. This is repeated in the earliest known "Moderns" ritual, the Berne manuscript, written in French between 1740 and 1744. Ramsay was initiated as a Templar by his mentor François Fénelon into the non-Masonic French Ordre du Temple with his friend Philippe II, Duke of Orleans as Grandmaster around 1710. After the death of Fenelon and the Duke of Orleans, Ramsay was initiated into Freemasonry around 1730. Since Ramsay's Templarism predated his relationship with Freemasonry by some 20 years, this is the likely source for the introduction of Templarism into Freemasonry.

In 1751 Baron Karl Gotthelf von Hund und Altengrotkau began the Rite of Strict Observance, which ritual he claimed to have received from the reconstituted Templar Order in 1743 in Paris. He also claimed to have met two of the "unknown superiors" who directed all of masonry, one of whom was Prince Charles Edward Stuart. The order went into decline when he failed to produce any evidence to support his claims, and was disbanded shortly after his death.

In 1779 the High Knights Templar of Ireland Lodge, Kilwinning, obtained a charter from Lodge Mother Kilwinning in Scotland. This lodge now began to grant dispensations to other lodges to confer the Knights Templar Degree. Some time around 1790 the Early Grand Encampment of Ireland was formed, which began to warrant Templar Lodges, and evolved into the Supreme Grand Encampment in 1836. The Early Grand Encampment chartered several Scottish "encampments" one of which, having been chartered in 1805 as the "Edinburgh Encampment No. 31", then became the"Grand Assembly of Knights Templar in Edinburgh". who then sought a charter from the Duke of Kent, Grand Master of the Order in England. It seems that the Templar degree had filtered into the lodges of the Antients from Ireland about 1780, and was recorded at York about the same time. In the five degree system developed by the York Masons, the Knights Templar degree sat between the Master Mason and the Sublime Degree of Royal Arch.

=== Grand Conclave of England ===
Templar masonry in England entered a new era in 1791, with the formation of its first Grand Conclave, with Thomas Dunckerley as Grand Master. At that time, there were eight known Templar encampments in England, the most senior being the Encampment of Redemption at York, and the Baldwyn encampment at Bristol, at whose request Dunckerley began his mission. Under his leadership, the number of encampments steadily grew until his death in 1795. Dunckerley's successor as Grand Master was Thomas Parkyns, 1st Baron Rancliffe. Stasis then followed, until in 1805 their Royal Patron, Duke of Kent, became Grand Master himself, re-energising the society and launching it into an era of growth and development. Dunckerley laid the foundation for this not only by promoting the order, but by standardising the ritual and insisting on proper record keeping. The Grand Conclave went into a period of decline between 1872 and 1895, when it was re-founded as the present day Great Priory of England and Wales.

== Administration ==
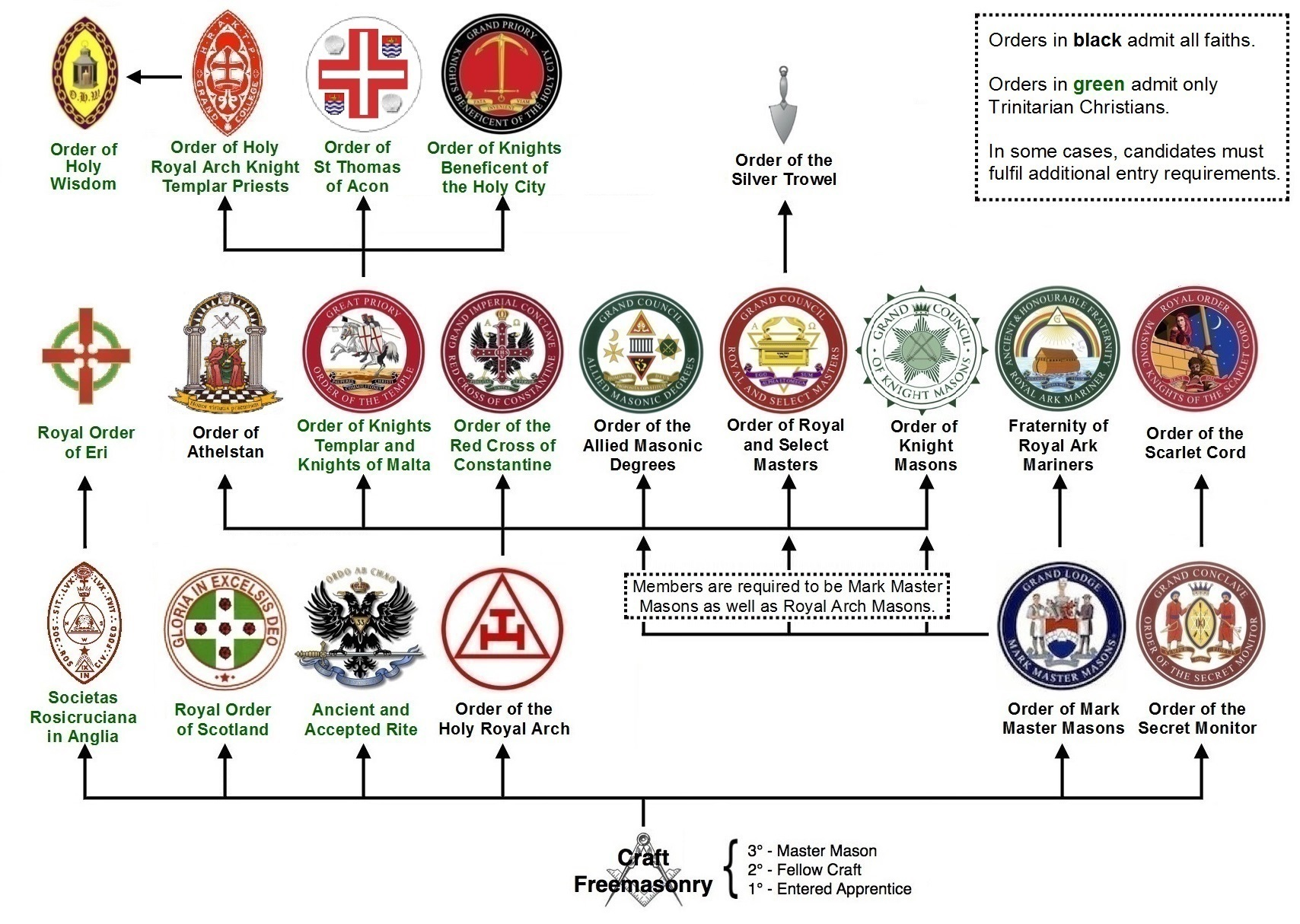
The position of the United Masonic Orders of the Temple and of Malta among the appendant bodies in England and Wales

Depending upon the geographical jurisdiction, the Knights Templar exist either as part of the York Rite or as an independent organization. Though the York Rite and the independent versions share many similarities there are key differences which are described below.

Outside the York Rite, membership is by invitation only. Candidates are required to be Master Masons, and Royal Arch Masons, and to sign a declaration that they profess the Doctrine of the Holy and Undivided Trinity. In some Australian States, the requirement of being a Royal Arch Mason no longer applies.

Within the British Federation of Le Droit Humain, candidates must be a Holy Royal Arch Mason for at least twelve months. Crucially, they do not have to profess the Doctrine of the Holy and Undivided Trinity, as this goes against the principles of the wider international Order.

Local bodies of Knights Templar are known as Preceptories; local bodies of Knights of St Paul are known as Chapters; local bodies of Knights of Malta are known as Priories; all operate under a Grand or Great Priory, often with an intermediate level of Provincial Priories. Although some jurisdictions maintain a separate Great Priory of the Temple and Great Priory of Malta (as, for example, in England), the Grand Master and other officers of both Great Priories hold simultaneous equal office in both bodies. Three degrees are administered in this system:

- The Degree of Knight Templar (Order of the Temple)
- The Degree of Knight of St. Paul (incorporating the Mediterranean Pass)
- The Degree of Knight of Malta (Order of Malta)

In England and Wales, the "Great Priory of England and Wales" for the Masonic Knights Templar is administered from Mark Masons' Hall, London.

== The Degrees or Orders ==
=== York Rite only: The Illustrious Order of the Red Cross ===
==== Teachings ====
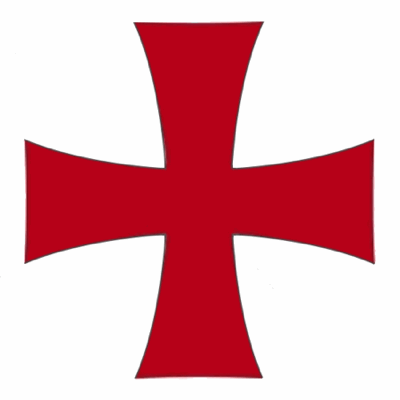
The Cross pattée, symbol of the Order of the Temple in the independent body.

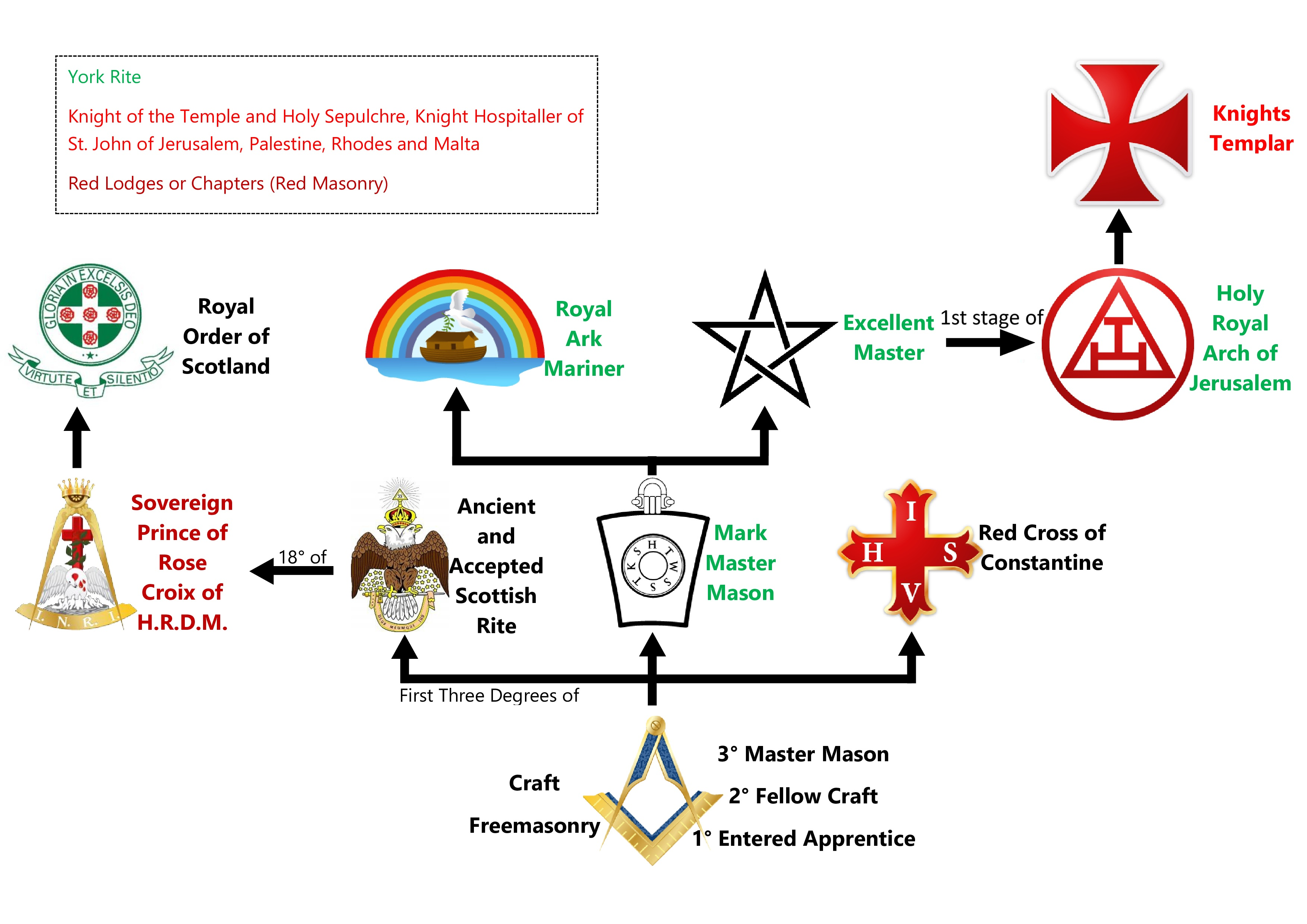
Position of the Templar degree among the Allied Degrees of British Le Droit Humain

The Order of the Red Cross continues or reverts to the period of the Royal Arch Degree when the Israelites were returning from Babylon to Jerusalem to rebuild the Temple. Zerubbabel, their leader prevails upon King Darius to restore the Holy Vessels to the new Temple. They had been carried away by the Babylonian armies when the first Temple was destroyed. In presenting his plea before the King, the companion gives a powerful testimony to the almighty force of Truth.

The ritual places the candidate in the role of Zerubbabel and follows him through his journey to King Darius in Persia and his role in the Immemorial Discussion, as found in the apocryphal book, 1 Esdras. The purpose is to bridge the gap between Royal Arch Masonry and the Chivalric Orders as well as between the Old Testament and the New Testament. The Illustrious Order of the Red Cross teaches the lessons of the triumph of truth.

=== The Degree of Knight of St Paul (or Mediterranean Pass) ===
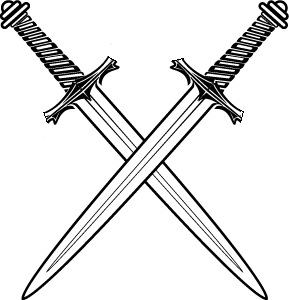
Two downward pointing swords in saltire, symbol of the Order of St Paul.

This degree is conferred as a prerequisite to becoming a Knight of Malta, in both the York Rite and independent 'stand-alone' versions of Knight Templar Freemasonry. The "Preliminary Declarations" of the Order of Malta ritual in England state of a candidate for the Order of Malta: "He must also have received the Degree of Knight of St Paul, including the Mediterranean Pass". The exact status of the 'Mediterranean Pass' has at times led to confusion as to whether this is the 'stub' of a separate degree. The English ritual book clarified this in its 1989 edition (and subsequent editions) by stating: "The Mediterranean Pass is one of the secrets of the Degree of Knight of St Paul".

This degree is close to being a true 'side degree', in that a small group (usually three) of members of the degree take the candidate "to one side" (i.e. apart on his own) and simply communicate the secrets of the degree to him, without actually working the ceremonial ritual of the degree. The only respect in which the degree fails to meet the definition of a true 'side degree' is that a Chapter of the Order would be formally opened and closed by the presiding officer, on either side of the secrets being communicated.

=== The Degree of Knight of Malta (Order of Malta) ===
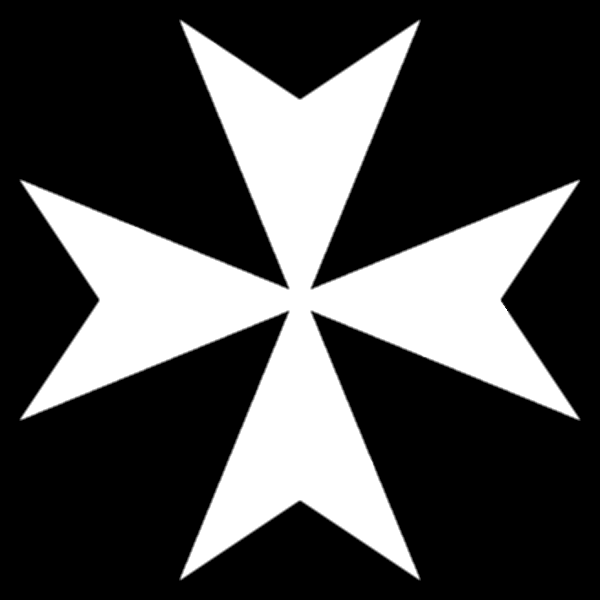
The Maltese Cross, symbol of the Order of Malta.

This degree is universally associated with the Masonic Knights Templar. In the York Rite system it is conferred before the Templar Degree; in the 'stand-alone' tradition it is conferred subsequently to the Templar Degree. It is known by varying degrees of formality as the Order of Malta, or the Order of Knights of Malta, or the Ancient and Masonic Order of St John of Jerusalem, Palestine, Rhodes, and Malta. In practice this last and fullest version of the name tends to be reserved to letterheads, rituals, and formal documents.

The ceremony for conferring the degree (which is always worked in full) contains a mixture of masonic tradition, historical accounts of the Order of St John, moral teaching, and the communication of modes of recognition between members. A series of banners is employed in the ceremony, each representing one of the great battles of the historic medieval Order of St John, whose story is the basis of the moral teachings of the degree.

The Cross and Crown, symbol of the Order of the Temple as found in the York Rite.

=== The Degree of Knight of the Temple (Order of the Temple) ===
The original medieval Order of Knights Templar was established after the First Crusade, and existed from approximately 1118 to 1312. There is no known historical evidence to link the medieval Knights Templar and Masonic Templarism, nor do the Masonic Knights Templar organizations claim any such direct link to the original medieval Templar organization. Though it has been said that its affiliation with Masonry is based on texts that indicate persecuted Templars found refuge within the safety of Freemasonry, the order itself states that "there is no proof of direct connection between the ancient order and the modern order known today as the Knights Templar." The official motto of the Knights Templar in the American York Rite is In Hoc Signo Vinces, the rendition in Latin of the Greek phrase "εν τούτῳ νίκα", en toutōi nika, meaning "in this [sign] you will conquer".

The Knight Templar degree is associated with elaborate regalia (costume) the precise detail of which varies between nations. The ritual draws upon the traditions of medieval Knights Templar, using them to impart moral instruction consistent with the biblical teachings of the Christian tradition.

==== Organization ====
In England and Wales, the teachings of the Order of the Red Cross feature in the Red Cross of Babylon which forms part of the Allied Masonic Degrees.

The Order of the Red Cross is often considered a compressed version of the Red Cross Degrees or Green Degrees which make up the Order of Knight Masons.

The Order of the Red Cross should not be confused with the Red Cross of Constantine.

== Other Rites ==
=== Degrees of the York Rite in the United States ===
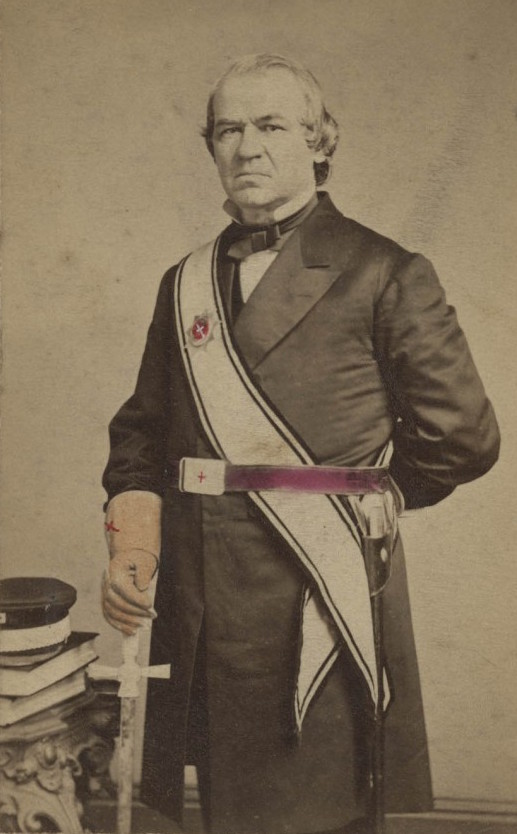
U.S. President Andrew Johnson in a Knights Templar uniform in 1869.

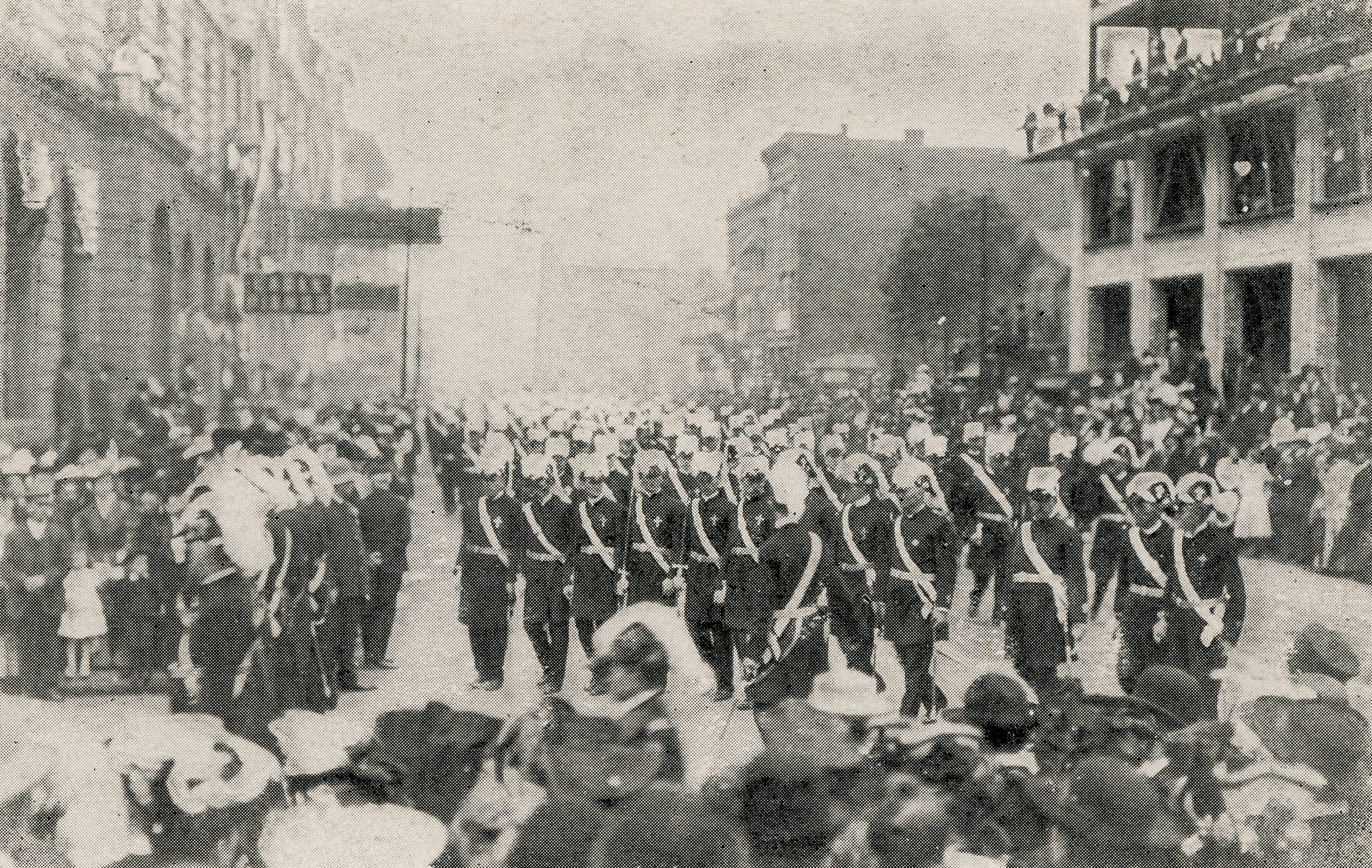
Knights Templar Parade on Superior Street, Toledo, Ohio, September 26, 1906

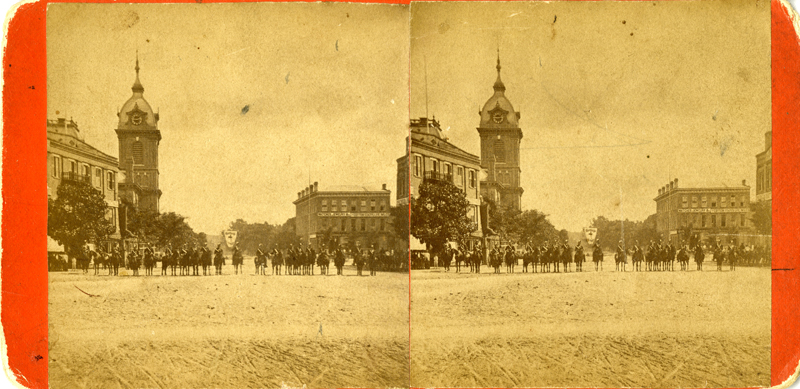
Knight Templars, parading on Cotton Avenue at 2nd Street, Macon, GA, circa 1880s

In the United States, a Knights Templar commandery is traditionally the final body that a member joins in the York Rite after the chapter of Royal Arch Masons and a council of Royal & Select Masters. Some jurisdictions, however, allow members to skip over membership in a council. A local Knights Templar commandery operates under a state-level Grand Commandery, however American commanderies also operate under The Grand Encampment of the United States. This is less common among American Masonic bodies, as many report to the state level alone.

While a chapter bestows the Royal Arch degrees, and a council bestows the Cryptic degrees, a Knights Templar commandery bestows three orders and one preparatory degree onto its members. This is opposed to the standard degree system found elsewhere in Freemasonry, and they are the only ones not to deal with the Hiramic Legend. The York Rite orders are:

- The Illustrious Order of the Red Cross
- The Degree of Saint Paul (or the Mediterranean Pass)
- The Order of the Knights of Malta (or simply Order of Malta)
- The Order of the Temple

=== Templar degrees in the Ancient and Accepted Scottish Rite ===
History and legend concerning the historical Knights Templar also play an important role in the degrees of the Ancient and Accepted Scottish Rite of Freemasonry, notably in the Rite's 30th Degree, Knight Kadosh. Other Scottish Rite degrees sometimes styled "Templar Degrees" include the 28th Degree (Knight Commander of the Temple, formerly denominated the 27th Degree in the Southern Jurisdiction of United States), the 29th Degree (Scottish Knight of Saint Andrew), the 32nd Degree (Master of the Royal Secret), and the 33rd Degree (Inspector General).

=== Templar themes in wider Freemasonry ===
Despite Freemasonry's general disclaimer that no one Masonic organization claims a direct heritage to the medieval Knights Templar, certain degrees and orders are obviously patterned after the medieval Order. These are best described as "commemorative orders" or degrees. Nevertheless, in spite of the fraternity's official disclaimers, some Masons, non-Masons and even anti-Masons insist that certain Masonic rites or degrees originally had direct Templar influence.

- American Masonic youth organizations such as the Order of DeMolay for young men are named after the last Grand Master Templar Jacques de Molay who was executed in the final suppression of the Templar order in the early 14th century.
- The Knight of Rose-Croix Degree in the "Ancient Accepted Scottish Rite", and honorary Orders like the Royal Order of Scotland are interpreted as evidence of a historical Templar-Masonic connection, though there is no factual basis for this belief.
- Rosslyn Chapel near Edinburgh has been suggested to be strong link between the Knights Templar and Freemasons due to reliefs combining Templar and Freemason symbolism. Historian Dr. Louise Yeoman, along with other mediaeval scholars, says the Knights Templar connection is false, and points out that Rosslyn Chapel was built by William Sinclair so that Mass could be said for the souls of his family. In addition, Rosslyn Chapel's connection to Freemasonry, as well as to the Templars, has been vigorously disputed by Robert L. D. Cooper, the Curator of the Grand Lodge of Scotland Museum and Library. It is postulated that any existing Masonic imagery was likely added at a later date, probably in the 1860s when James St Clair-Erskine, 3rd Earl of Rosslyn instructed Edinburgh architect David Bryce, a known Freemason, to undertake restoration work on areas of the church including many of the carvings.
- Legends in certain degrees recount that Knights under the command of Sir John De Bermingham, first and last Earl of Louth, aided Scottish King Robert the Bruce, who had been excommunicated, at the Battle of Bannockburn; but this account is based on an 18th-century romance and is not supported by any evidence. This story is the basis for the degrees in the Royal Order of Scotland, an invitational Masonic honorary organization.
- Templar connections have also been suggested through the Earls of Rosslyn (St. Clair, or Sinclair) a family with well documented connections with Scottish Freemasonry, one being a Grand Master of the Grand Lodge of Scotland.

== See also ==
- Red Cross of Constantine
- Sovereign Military Order of Malta

| Preceded by Holy Royal Arch | Knights Templar | Succeeded by Order of St. Thomas of Acon or Order of Knights Beneficent of the Holy City |
