= Thomas Dunckerley =

English freemason (1724–1795)

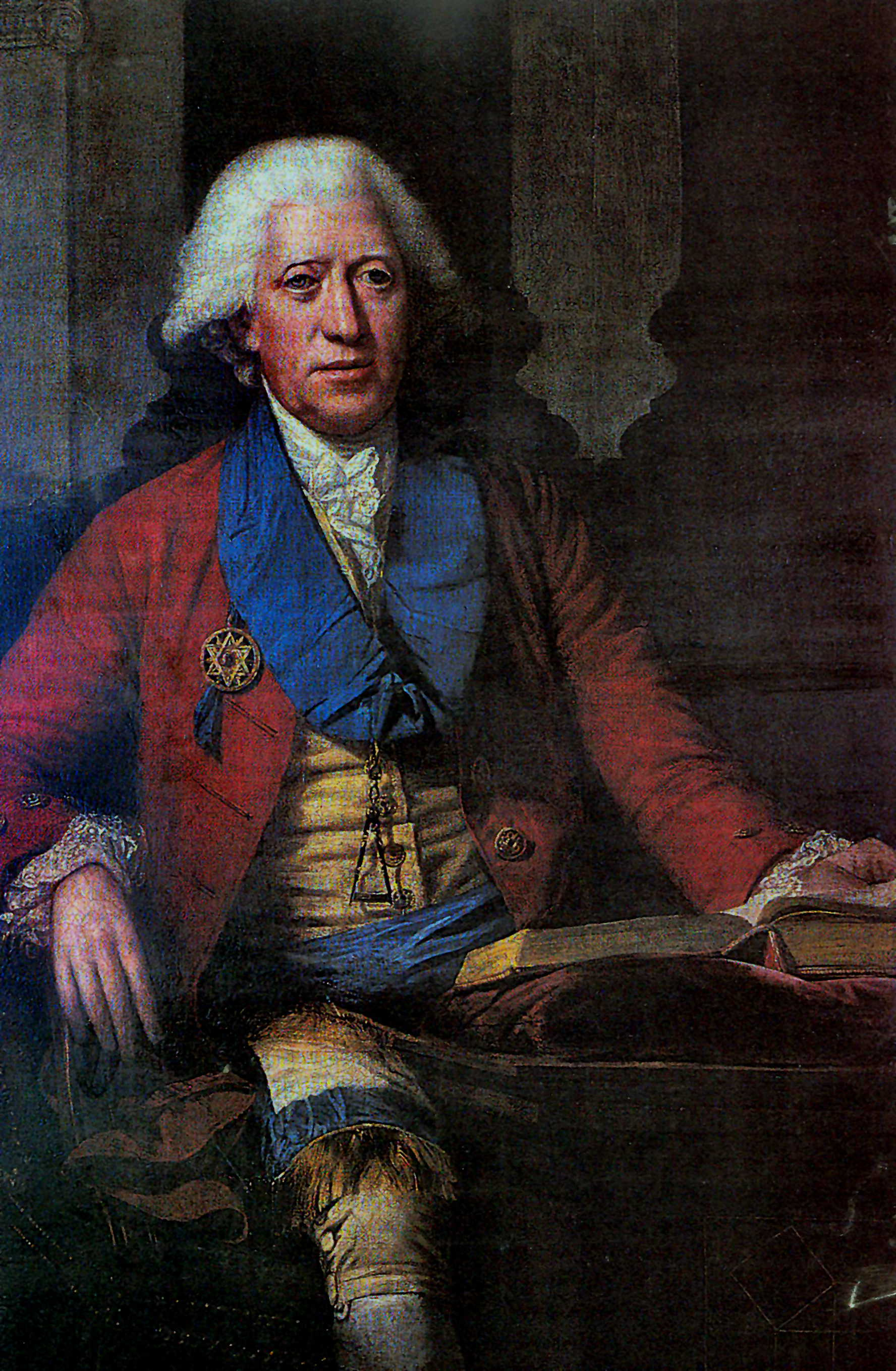
- Frontispiece from Sadler's biography of Dunckerley
- Born: 23 October 1724
- Died: 19 November 1795 (aged 71)
- Father: George II of Great Britain (allegedly)

Thomas Dunckerley (23 October 1724 – 19 November 1795) was a prominent freemason, being appointed Provincial Grand Master of several provinces, promoting Royal Arch masonry, introducing Mark Masonry to England, and instituting a national body for Templar masonry. This was made possible by an annuity of £100, rising to £800, which he obtained from King George III by claiming to be his father's illegitimate half brother.

== Early career ==
In 1735, Dunckerley was articled to William Simpson, a barber and peruke maker of St Martin-in-the-Fields, Westminster, but ran away after just two years to join the navy. He is recorded from 14 April to 4 August 1742 as an able seaman on the muster book of HMS Namur. On 6 January 1745, the minutes of Trinity House at Deptford record that 'Mr Thomas Dunckerley being Examin'd & found Qualify'd to be a School Master in her Majesty's Navy & having produc'd a certificate (as usual) of his Sobriety & good Affection to his Majesty, he was certify'd accordingly'. He is first mentioned in Admiralty records on 19 February 1744, when, not quite twenty years of age, he was appointed schoolmaster on a seventy gun ship called HMS Edinburgh. In 1746, he was appointed Gunner on a sloop, a term equivalent to Chief Gunnery Officer. He proceeded to posts as Gunner on larger ships, including the 90-gun HMS Prince (ex-Triumph). From 1757 to 1761 he served on HMS Vanguard as both Gunner and Schoolmaster. On this ship, he saw service at the Siege of Quebec. After service on HMS Prince, he was superannuated in 1764.

== Royal paternity ==
According to Dunckerley, it was in 1760, while attending his mother's funeral, her neighbour, Mrs Pinkney, told him of her death-bed confession. While her husband was away on the business of the Duke of Devonshire, she had been seduced by the Prince of Wales (later King George II), who was Thomas' natural father. Being immediately called away to sea, this information was of no immediate use to him. However, on his superannuation in 1764, monies owed to him were not paid due to incomplete paperwork, and he was obliged to pay medical expenses after an accident caused his daughter to require an amputation of the lower leg. This left him in debt, and arranging for his pension to be paid to his family, he took ship with the frigate HMS Guadeloupe to the Mediterranean. The next year, he was put ashore at Marseille with scurvy. On his recovery, with the help of Captain Ruthven of the Guadeloupe and the financial assistance of freemasons in Gibraltar, Dunckerley managed to lay his case before several persons of rank on his way back to England. Finally, in 1767, his mother's statement was laid before King George III, who accepted Dunckerley's claim to be the half brother of his father, Frederick, Prince of Wales, the son of George II, and provided an annuity of £100, which quickly rose to £800. He also was granted apartments in Hampton Court Palace.

Dunckerley's claim of royal paternity was not universally accepted in his lifetime. On his death at least one contemporary cast doubt on his illegitimacy. Recent studies also claim to refute his own version of his parentage, although Arthur Edward Waite certainly accepted it, perhaps based on his resemblance to George III in his portrait.

== Dunckerley as Freemason ==
Dunckerley was initiated into Freemasonry at Lodge No 31, at the Three Tuns in Portsmouth, in January 1754. In 1760, he obtained a warrant for a lodge aboard HMS Vanguard, which he took to form London Lodge (now No. 108) in 1768. After leaving Vanguard, he obtained a warrant for a lodge on HMS Prince, which he later transferred to HMS Guadeloupe. This later became the Somerset House Lodge, meeting at the Turk's Head in Soho. With the Vanguard warrant, he obtained a roving commission from the Premier Grand Lodge of England to inspect the state of the craft wherever he went, including "to regulate Masonic affairs in the newly acquired Canadian provinces." Under this authority, as Acting Grand Master of all Warranted Lodges in Quebec he installed the first Provincial Grand Master of Canada, Col. Simon Frasier, in Quebec in 1760.

In 1767, he was appointed Provincial Grand Master of Hampshire. At that time, the office of Provincial Grand Master had fallen into disuse, but Dunckerley would personally revive it in several counties. He is known to have been the Provincial Grand Master for Essex from 1776, Dorsetshire and Wiltshire from 1777, and Gloucestershire and Hampshire in 1784. A document of 1786 appoints him Provincial Grand Master for the Counties of Dorset, Essex, Gloucester, Somerset and Southampton, the City and County of Bristol and the Isle of Wight. In 1785, Dunkerley founded the Lodge of Harmony, Number 255, at the Toy Inn at Hampton Court, presumably as his own home lodge. It was at Dunckerley's request that the province of Bristol was created, still unique in English Freemasonry as the only province confined to a single city, and having all of its lodges meeting in the same building. In 1790 he was also made Provincial Grand Master of Herefordshire.

In 1766, the Moderns who worked the Royal Arch degree formed a Grand Chapter with Lord Blayney at its head. He made Dunckerley his Grand Superintendent, in which capacity he authorised chapters, and toured his provinces creating new chapters and Royal Arch Masons, frequently (according to some historians) exceeding his authority. Although Dunckerley belonged to the Moderns Grand Lodge, he leaned towards the Antients in ritual, making him a natural ambassador for Royal Arch Masonry in his own Grand Lodge. He was one of the signatories on the original charter of the Moderns Grand Chapter.

The first evidence of Mark Masonry is in 1769, when Dunckerley, at a Royal Arch Chapter, made several brethren Mark Masons and Mark Masters. It is possible that Dunckerley created the degree.

In 1790 and 1791, Dunckerley projected the centralization of the rather scattered Templar groups in England. On 24 July 1791 he informed the York Encampment of Redemption that he had been invited to assume the office of Grand Master by the Knights Templar of Bristol. York favored the proposal, and in due course Dunckerley accepted the office. The groups referred to his authority in 1791 included The Observance of London, the Redemption of York, the Eminent of Bristol, and the Antiquity of Bath. Dunckerley became the Grand Master of the first national Grand Conclave of "The Royal Exalted Religious and Military Order Heredom, Kadosh, Grand Elected Knights Templar of St. John of Jerusalem, Palestine, Rhodes and Malta". His energy and organisational zeal contributed to the growth of the order until his death in 1795. After this, the institution became moribund until revived by the Duke of Kent almost a decade later.

The encyclopedist Albert Mackey blamed Dunckerley for inventing Royal Arch Masonry, and splitting the third degree in the process, removing the true word of a Mason to the new degree, and losing the original "pure" form of the ritual forever. This is unlikely, as the Royal Arch degree was worked for at least a decade before Dunckerley's initiation.

He published a number of charges, lectures and songs related to different branches of Freemasonry. Together with Grand Secretary Heseltine and William Preston, he campaigned and raised funds for the first dedicated headquarters of English Freemasonry, the first Freemasons' Hall. During his lifetime he held various high Masonic offices: Past Senior Grand Warden of England, Provincial Grand Master for the Counties above mentioned, and Past Grand Master and Grand Superintendent of Royal Arch Masons over eighteen counties. His major contribution was to the emerging "higher degrees", the Templar, Royal Arch, Ark Mariner, and Mark degrees. Not only did he successfully promote them, he organised them, standardised their ritual, and forced them to keep proper records.

== Bibliography ==
- Thomas Dunckerley, The Light and Truth of Masonry Explained. Sixpence pamphlet, London, 1757
- Thomas Dunckerley, Song for Knights Templar, The Freemason's Magazine, August 1794
- Henry Sadler, Thomas Dunckerley, his life, labor and letters. London, 1891
- Arthur Edward Waite, A New Encyclopaedia of Freemasonry. 2 volumes, London, 1921. Reprinted in 1970 by Weathervane Books and in 1994 by Wings Books.
