= Order of Saint Thomas of Acon =

British Masonic organisation

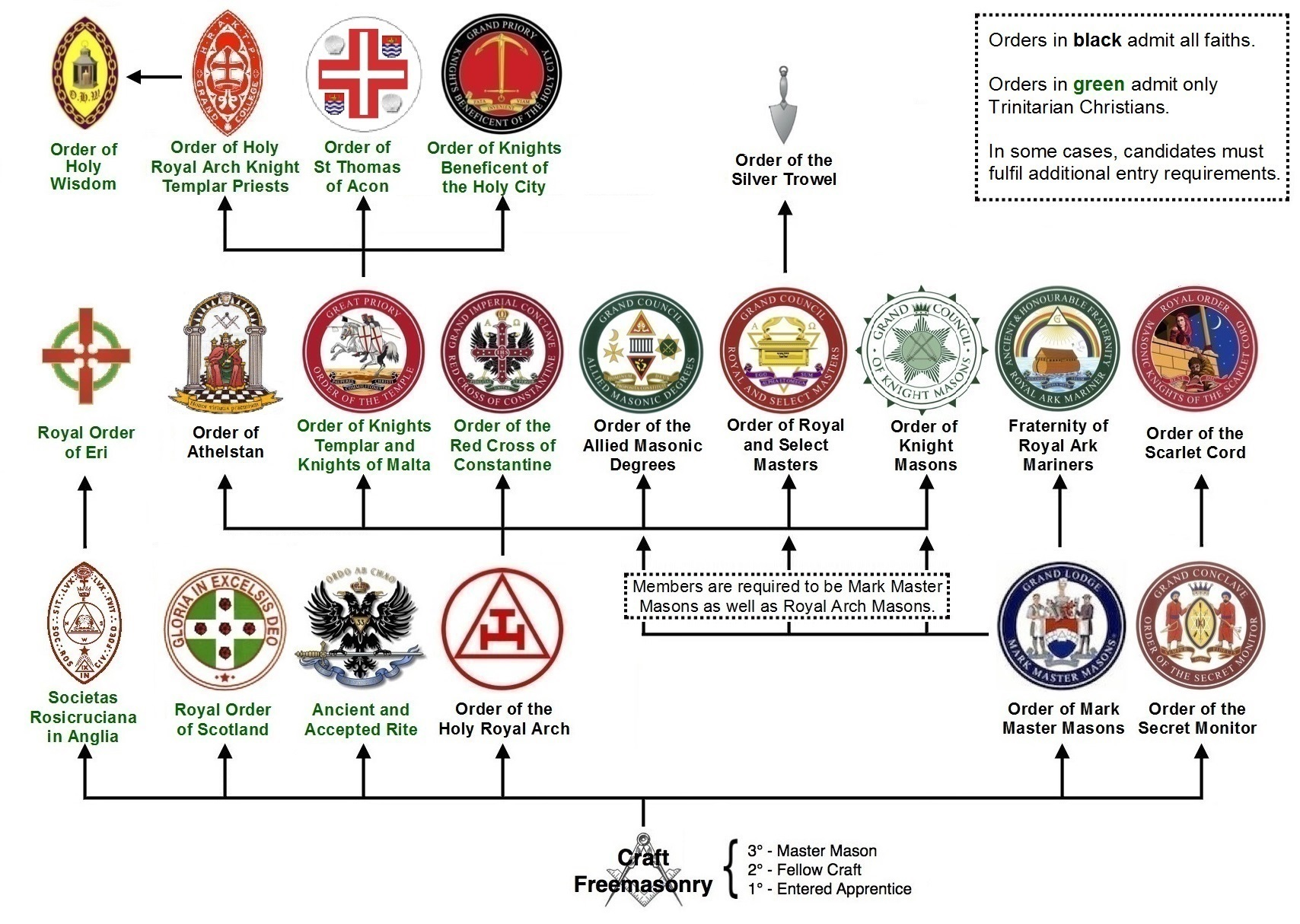
The position of the Order of Saint Thomas of Acon among the Masonic appendant bodies in England and Wales

The Commemorative Order of Saint Thomas of Acon is an independent British Christian masonic organisation. Membership is restricted to those who are subscribing members of a Preceptory (Commandery) in amity with the Great Priory of the United Religious, Military and Masonic Order of the Temple of England and Wales and Provinces Overseas (commonly referred to as the Knights Templar). Membership is by invitation only. The basic organisation of the Order is a Chapel.

== Foundation ==
The Order of St. Thomas of Acon was established in 1974 as a result of twenty years' research in the Guildhall Library in London by John E. N. Walker, who for many years was the Secretary General of the Societas Rosicruciana in Anglia. The ancient records of the Knights of Saint Thomas, written in medieval French and Latin, had been deposited in the London Guildhall Library and escaped the Great Fire of 1666. The Order now operates under the official title of The Commemorative Order of St Thomas of Acon.

As of July 2015 there were 112 Chapels of the Order in England, Wales, Spain, Canada, Australia, New Zealand, and the United States of America, and, more recently, a new province in Brazil.

== Regalia ==
The regalia of the Order bears some similarity to that of a Masonic Knight Templar, and consists of a stone white tunic, on the front of which is a Latin Cross, Medici Crimson, four inches wide, the full length of the tunic, on which is superimposed a white Latin Cross one-third the width. The intersection of the Cross is charged with a Bronze Escallope Shell, four inches diameter. Over the tunic is worn a stone white mantle with hood; on the left breast, a Greek Cross of ten inches length, upon which is a smaller white cross, the intersection of which is charged with a Bronze Escallope Shell. Knights also wear a crimson velvet cap, the front of which is charged with a Bronze Escallope Shell. Knights, with the exception of the Prior and Almoner, wear a sword belt and sword with scabbard. Provincial Officers and Grand officers dress in similar fashion except that Provincial Officers wear silver Shells and Grand Officers wear Gold Shells.

The banner of the Order depicts the Arms of the Order and comprises: Argent, a Cross Rouge extending to the edge of the Banner, upon which is superimposed a smaller Cross Argent. In the first quarter of the Banner is an Escallope Shell Or, fimbriated Rouge.
