= Cryptic Masonry =

Second part of the York Rite system of Masonic degrees

The Royal & Select Masters' Emblem. (Found with or without the sword)

Cryptic Masonry is the second part of the York Rite system of Masonic degrees, and the last found within the Rite that deals specifically with the Hiramic Legend. These degrees are the gateway to Temple restoration rituals or the Second Temple Legend. The body itself is known as either the Council of Royal & Select Masters or Council of Cryptic Masons depending on the jurisdiction.

== Constituent degrees ==
Within the York Rite, members of Cryptic Masonry meet as a Council, and the Council confers three degrees: Royal Master, Select Master, and Super Excellent Master. Outside the United States, Grand Councils have the right to confer other degrees such as the Royal Ark Mariner degree in Canada and the Excellent Master degree in Scotland. In England and Wales, the York Rite degrees of Cryptic Masonry are part of the Order of Royal and Select Masters.

== Organization ==
=== Local Council of Royal and Select Masters ===
A Council is similar in many ways to a Masonic Lodge; it has officers and a ritual degree system, which in this case consists of three degrees: Royal Master, Select Master, and Super Excellent Master. The Super Excellent master's degree is optional in some jurisdictions. The various positions in the lodge are modeled directly after Craft Masonry and though the names are often different the duties are largely the same. Their seating is a bit different, however, in that all three principals of a council sit on the east dais, while the captain of the guard and conductor of the council sit in the west and south.

Craft Masonry	Cryptic Masonry
Worshipful Master	Illustrious Master
Senior Warden	Deputy Master
Junior Warden	Principal Conductor of the Work
Treasurer	Treasurer
Secretary	Recorder
Chaplain	Chaplain
Senior Deacon	Captain of the Guard
Junior Deacon	Conductor of the Council
Senior Steward	Steward
Junior Steward	
Associate [or Assistant] Steward(s)	
Marshal	Master of Ceremonies
Organist/Musician	Organist (or Musician)
Tiler	Sentinel

Councils in some jurisdictions have more than one steward,. Organist/musician is an optional office in either body, and is quite often vacant. The council office of marshal is optional in some jurisdictions.

=== Grand Councils ===
Every US state has its own Grand Council, which performs the same administrative functions for its subordinate councils as a Grand Lodge does for its subordinate lodges. In other countries, there are either national or state Grand Councils. The council also has its own equivalents of Grand Lodge Officers, modified from the titles of the officers of a council:

- Most Illustrious Grand Master
- Right Illustrious Deputy Grand Master
- Right Illustrious Grand Principal Conductor of the Work
- Right Illustrious Grand Treasurer
- Right Illustrious Grand Recorder
- Very Illustrious Grand Chaplain
- Very Illustrious Grand Captain of the Guard
- Very Illustrious Grand Conductor of the Council
- Very Illustrious Grand Marshal
- Very Illustrious Grand Steward
- Very Illustrious Grand Lecturer
- Very Illustrious Grand Sentinel

Jurisdictions that are not members of the General Grand Council may use different titles than those presented here. For instance, in Pennsylvania, the title "Most Puissant Grand Master" is used in place of "Most Illustrious Grand Master." Many Prince Hall grand councils instead use the title "Grand Thrice Illustrious Master".

In jurisdictions that have them, there are also Regional Deputy Grand Masters or District Inspectors appointed by the Most Illustrious Grand Master to oversee the districts of the jurisdiction as the representative of the Most Illustrious Grand Master. In other jurisdictions these duties are performed by a Master of the Arch. Grand Representatives are appointed to keep in contact with their counterparts in other jurisdictions.

Grand Councils also contribute to specific charities which differ from state to state.

=== General Grand Council ===
Many of the Grand Councils around the world are members of an umbrella group called General Grand Council of Cryptic Masons International, founded 25 August 1880. It publishes a quarterly magazine called The Cryptic Freemason and supports the Cryptic Masons Medical Research Foundation, Inc.

== History and development of the Cryptic Degrees ==
The degrees of Royal and Select Master were not originally combined into one system, each having been conferred by separate parties and initially controlled by separate Councils. As near as may be determined from conflicting claims, the Select degree is the oldest of the Rite. It was customary to confer the Royal degree on Master Masons prior to the Royal Arch, and the Select degree after exaltation to the sublime degree. This accounts for the fact that control of the Cryptic degrees vacillated back and forth in many jurisdictions, even after the formation of Grand Councils. To this date, the Royal and Select degrees are controlled by Grand Chapter in Virginia and West Virginia, and conferred by subordinate Chapters in those jurisdictions.

The Royal degree appears to have been developed primarily in New York under direction of Thomas Lownds, whereas the Select was vigorously promulgated by Philip Eckel in Baltimore. It is claimed by Eckel that a Grand Council of Select Masters was formed in Baltimore in 1792, while it is definitely known that a Grand Council of Royal Masters (Columbian No. 1) was organized in 1810 in New York. It remained for Jeremy Ladd Cross to combine the two degrees under one system, which occurred about 1818, and this pattern was adopted in most jurisdictions as the degrees became dispersed beyond the eastern seaboard.

The degree of Super Excellent Master is not allied to the other two degrees of the Cryptic Rite, so far as its teachings and traditions are concerned. The records of St. Andrews Chapter in Boston indicate that a degree of this name was conferred during the latter part of the eighteenth century. The earliest positive reference to the Super Excellent in connection to the Cryptic Rite is 22 December 1817, when a "Lodge" of Super Excellent Masters was organized by Columbian Council of Royal Masters in New York. The incidents, teachings, and ritualistic format of the Super Excellent degree bear no resemblance in any former degrees so named, which appears to justify the claim that it is American in origin. This degree has been, and to some extent still is, a rather controversial subject. It is conferred as one of the regular Cryptic Rite degrees in some jurisdictions, whereas the others confer it as an honorary degree only; in some instances, separate Grand Councils of Super Excellent Masters have been formed.
