= List of Freemasons (E–Z) =

This is a list of notable Freemasons. Freemasonry is a fraternal organisation that exists in a number of forms worldwide. Throughout history some members of the fraternity have made no secret of their involvement, while others have not made their membership public. In some cases, membership can only be proven by searching through the fraternity's records. Such records are most often kept at the individual lodge level, and may be lost due to fire, flood, deterioration, or simple carelessness. Grand Lodge governance may have shifted or reorganized, resulting in further loss of records on the member or the name, number, location or even existence of the lodge in question. In areas of the world where Masonry has been suppressed by governments, records of entire grand lodges have been destroyed. Because of this, masonic membership can sometimes be difficult to verify.

Standards of "proof" for those on this list may vary widely; some figures with no verified lodge affiliation are claimed as Masons if reliable sources give anecdotal evidence suggesting they were familiar with the "secret" signs and passes, but other figures are rejected over technical questions of regularity in the lodge that initiated them. Where available, specific lodge membership information is provided; where serious questions of verification have been noted by other sources, this is also indicated.

== E ==
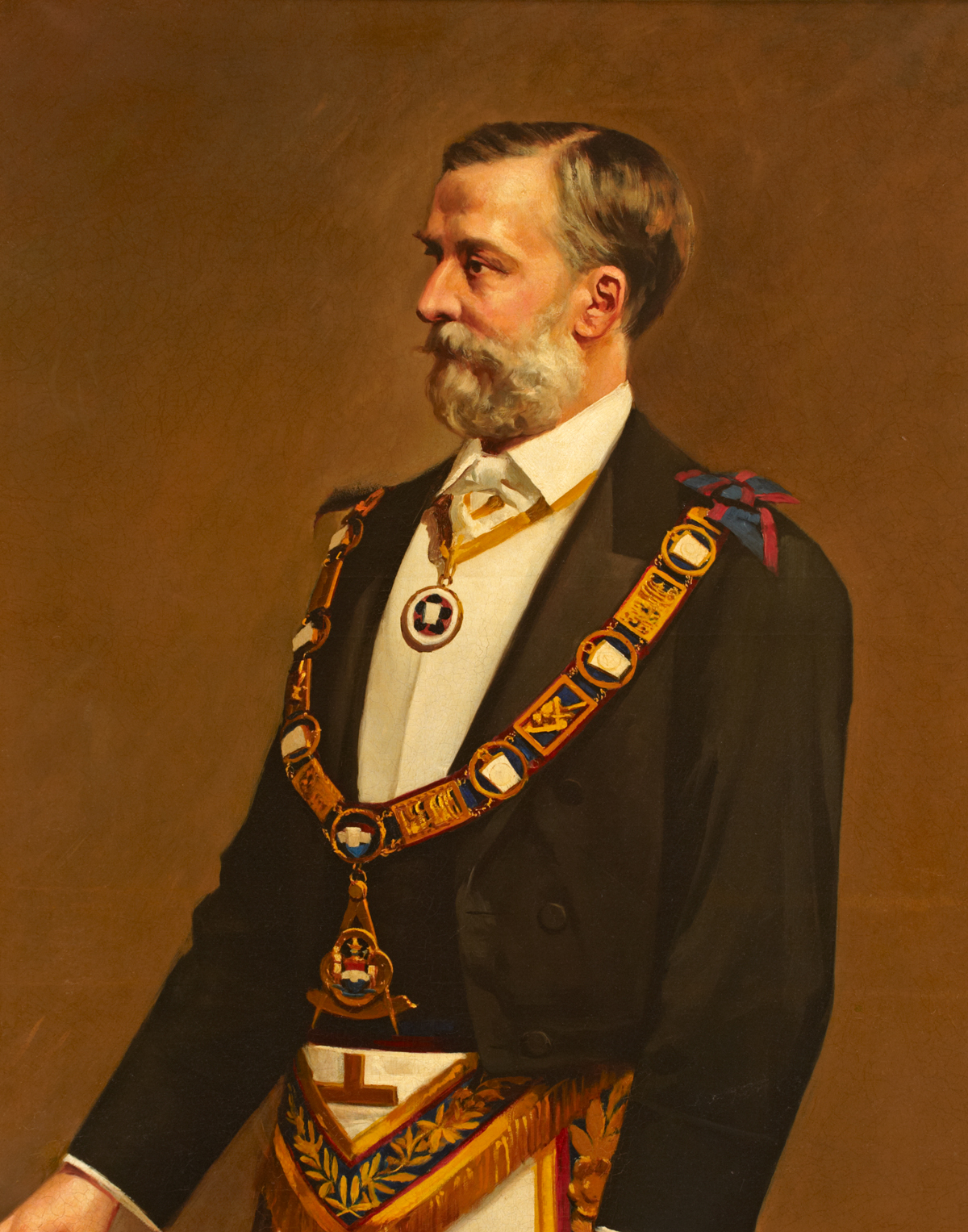
The Earl Egerton in Masonic regalia by Jean Marius Rogier

- George Howard Earle III (1890–1974), 38th governor of Pennsylvania and diplomat
- Hubert L. Eaton, American chemist, originator of "Memorial park" cemeteries in the US. Euclid Lodge, No. 58, Great Falls, Montana.
- John David Eaton, president of the Canadian-based T. Eaton Company. Assiniboine No. 114, G.R.M., Winnipeg.
- Darío Echandía, Colombian politician and Ambassador to the Holy See
- Duke of Edinburgh, see Prince Philip (below)
- Merritt A. Edson Sr. (1897–1955), Medal of Honor recipient and MajGen, U.S. Marine Corps.
- Arthur Edwards (1863–1927), architect. Worshipful Master of the Holte Lodge of Freemasons in 1907.
- Prince Edward, Duke of Kent (Prince Edward George Nicholas Paul Patrick), member of the British Royal Family, Grand Master of the United Grand Lodge of England, member of various lodges including Royal Alpha Lodge No. 16 (UGLE).
- Prince Edward, Duke of York and Albany (1739–1767), younger brother of George III of the United Kingdom. Initiated in the Lodge of Friendship (later known as Royal York Lodge of Friendship), Berlin, Germany, on 27 July 1765.
- Edward VII, King of Great Britain
- Edward VIII, King of Great Britain.
- Wilbraham Egerton, 1st Earl Egerton (1832–1909), British politician
- Gustave Eiffel, designer and architect of the Eiffel Tower
- Donn F. Eisele (1930–1987), American astronaut
- Philip Eliot (1862–1946), English Anglican clergyman and Bishop of Buckingham. Provincial Grand Master of Buckinghamshire (UGLE).
- Duke Ellington, musician. Social Lodge No. 1, Washington, D.C., Prince Hall Affiliation.
- William Ellison-Macartney, British politician, Member of Parliament (1885–1903), and Australian state governor. Apollo University Lodge No. 357, Oxford; Grand Master of Western Australia.
- Oliver Ellsworth, Chief Justice of the United States Supreme Court (1796–1800)
- John Elway, Hall of Fame quarterback for the Denver Broncos (1983–1998). South Denver Lodge No. 93, Denver, Colorado.
- James Emmert, Indiana Attorney General (1943–1947) and Justice of the Indiana Supreme Court (1947–1959), member of the Greensburg Lodge.
- John Entwistle, bassist, Rock and Roll Hall of Fame member of The Who
- Ernest II, Duke of Saxe-Coburg and Gotha (1818–1893), German Duke
- Ernest Augustus (1771– 1851), King of Hanover from 1837 to 1851
- David Erskine, 11th Earl of Buchan (1742–1829), Scottish peer and 34th Grand Master Mason of Scotland, 1782–1783
- Henry Erskine, 10th Earl of Buchan (1710–1767), FRS Scottish peer and 10th Grand Master Mason of Scotland, 1745–1746
- Henry Erskine, 12th Earl of Buchan (1783–1857), Scottish peer and 59th Grand Master Mason of Scotland, 1832–1833
- Thomas Erskine, 6th Earl of Kellie, Scottish musician, Grand Master of Scotland (1763–1765)
- Sam Ervin, U.S. senator from North Carolina
- Ben Espy, American politician, served in the Ohio Senate
- Bob Etheridge, congressman (D – NC), Bakersville Lodge No. 357, North Carolina
- Richard Eve, Grand Treasurer of the United Grand Lodge of England in 1889
- Colonel George Everest, English surveyor, Surveyor General of India, after whom Mount Everest is named. Member of Prince of Wales's Lodge No. 493 (later became No. 259), London.

== F ==
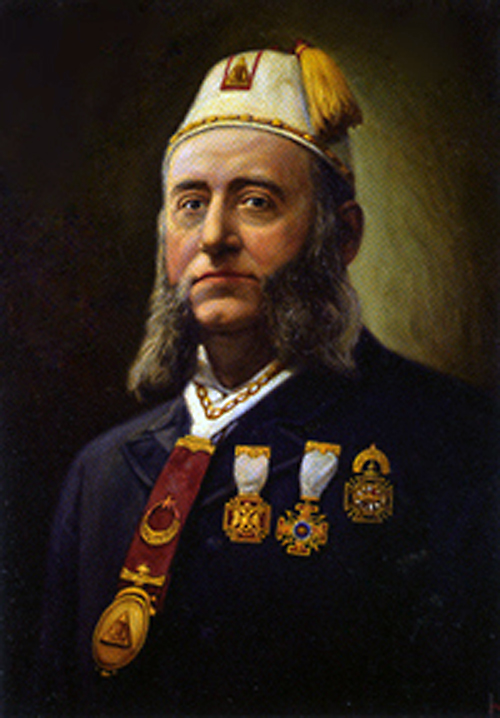
Walter Fleming in Masonic regalia

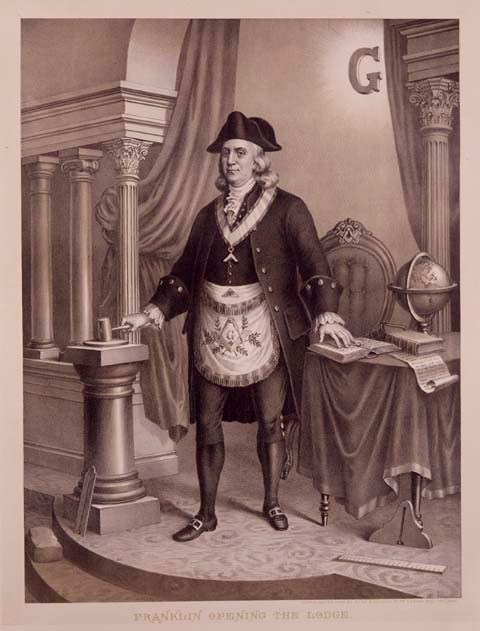
Benjamin Franklin in Masonic regalia

- Eberhard Faber, founder of the Faber Pencil Company. Chancellor Walworth No. 271, New York.
- Seymour Clarence Fabrick (1915–2005), American businessman.
- Sir Arthur Fadden, 13th prime minister of Australia, initiated into Caledonia Lodge No. 737, Queensland
- Dez Fafara, singer of DevilDriver (formerly of Coal Chamber), North Hollywood Lodge No. 542, Los Angeles, California
- Douglas Fairbanks (1883–1939), American movie star and film director. Initiated: 1925, Beverly Hills Lodge No. 528, California. Raised: 11 August 1925, Beverly Hills Lodge No. 528.
- Philip Michael Faraday (1875–1944), architect and composer. Initiated into the Holloway Lodge No. 2601 in 1898 and Grand Organist of the UGLE from 1914.
- Brian Faulkner (1947– ), British Army soldier
- Bob Feller (1918–2010), American athlete. Grove Lodge #824, Downers Grove, Illinois.
- Rigas Feraios, national hero of Greece
- Charles Fergusson, Governor-General of New Zealand, Grand Master
- Enrico Fermi, Nobel Prize-winning physicist. FRS. Adriano Lemmi Lodge, Rome, 1923.
- Ettore Ferrari, Italian sculptor. Grand Master of the Grande Oriente d'Italia.
- Jules Ferry, French politician. Member of the Alsace-Lorraine Lodge of Paris.
- Ignaz Aurelius Fessler, Hungarian ecclesiastic and writer. Member of Lodge Pythagoras of the Blazing Star in Berlin.
- Johann Gottlieb Fichte, German philosopher. Member of Lodge Pythagoras of the Blazing Star in Berlin.
- Stephen Johnson Field, U.S. Supreme Court Associate Justice (1863–1897)
- W. C. Fields, American comedian. E. Coppée Mitchell Lodge No. 605, Philadelphia.
- Charles Grandison Finney, American preacher, evangelist and author (1792–1875). Meridian Sun Lodge No. 32 in Warren, New York. Finney asked for dismissal and was discharged.
- Hamilton Fish IV, Congressman from New York
- Geoffrey Fisher, 99th Archbishop of Canterbury and head of the worldwide Anglican Communion
- Abram Fitkin, American businessman and philanthropist (1878–1933). Altair Lodge No. 601, Brooklyn.
- Lord Frederick FitzClarence, illegitimate son of King William IV. Grand Master of Scotland (1841–1843).
- Harris Flanagin (1817–1874), seventh governor of Arkansas. Hugh de Payens Commandery No. 1 of Knights Templar, Little Rock, Arkansas.
- Edwin Flavell, brigadier under Field Marshal Montgomery. DSO. MC. Provincial Grand Master of Berkshire 1967–85.
- Alexander Fleming, Scottish biologist and pharmacologist. London Scottish Rifles Lodge No. 2310.
- Sandford Fleming, Canadian engineer and inventor. St. Andrew's No. 16, Toronto, Ontario.
- Walter Fleming, co-founder of the Shriners
- Cyril Fletcher, English comedian
- Thomas Fletcher (1817–1880), acting governor of Arkansas. Magnolia No. 60, Little Rock, Arkansas.
- William J. Florence, co-founder of the Shriners
- Arnoldo Foà, Italian actor. Lodge Alto Adige, Rome.
- Nandor Fodor (1895–1964), British and American parapsychologist, psychoanalyst, author and journalist of Hungarian origin.
- Martin Folkes, president of the Royal Society (1741–1753). Deputy Grand Master of the Premier Grand Lodge of England (1724–1725).
- Sir William Forbes, 6th Baronet, Scottish banker. Grand Master of Scotland (1776–1778).
- Isaac de Forcade de Biaix, Royal Prussian colonel and Hofmarschall to the Prince of Prussia. Knight of the Order of Pour le Mérite, Prussia's highest order of merit for heroism.
- Gerald Ford, President of the United States
- Glenn Ford, American actor
- Henry Ford, founder of the Ford Motor Company. Palestine Lodge No 357, Detroit.
- Nathan Bedford Forrest, Confederate States Army general. Angerona Lodge No. 168, Memphis, Tennessee – received only the First Degree and never advanced further.
- Steven D. Foster, American politician
- Benjamin Franklin, American inventor and statesman. St. John's Lodge, Philadelphia, February 1731.
- Eric Fraser, British businessman and civil servant, Director-General of Aircraft Production during World War Two. Royal Somerset House & Inverness Lodge No 4 (UGLE).
- Joe Frazier (1944–2011), boxer and undisputed heavyweight boxing champion. Member of MB Taylor Lodge No. 141.
- Prince Frederick, Duke of York and Albany (16 August 1763 – 5 January 1827), second eldest child and second son of King George III of the United Kingdom
- Prince Frederick of Hesse-Kassel, German noble
- Prince Frederick of the Netherlands, Dutch prince
- Frederick the Great, King of Prussia. Member and founder of the lodge Zu den drei Weltkugeln (Of the Three Globes).
- Frederick I of Württemberg, Ruler of Württemberg
- Frederick III, German Emperor and King of Prussia
- Frederick VII of Denmark, King of Denmark
- Frederick VIII of Denmark, King of Denmark
- Frederick William II of Prussia, King of Prussia
- John French, 1st Earl of Ypres (1852–1925), English army officer and Commander-in-Chief of the British Expeditionary Force during World War I
- Alfred Hermann Fried (1864–1921), Austrian Jewish pacifist and publicist. Winner (with Tobias Asser) of the Nobel Peace Prize in 1911.
- Bridge Frodsham (1733?–1768), English provincial actor. Master of Punch Bowl 259 at York 1761–62 (Premier Grand Lodge of England).
- W. A. Fry (1872–1944), Canadian sports administrator and newspaper publisher, lodge member of Dunnville, Ontario
- Boyd C. Fugate (1884–1967), Tennessee state representative
- Tony Fulton (1951 – 2005), American politician and member of the Maryland House of Delegates between 1987 and 2005.
- Jonas Furrer (1805–1861), 1st president of the Swiss Confederation
- Will Fyffe, Scottish singer and actor. Lodge St John, Shotts No 471.

== G ==
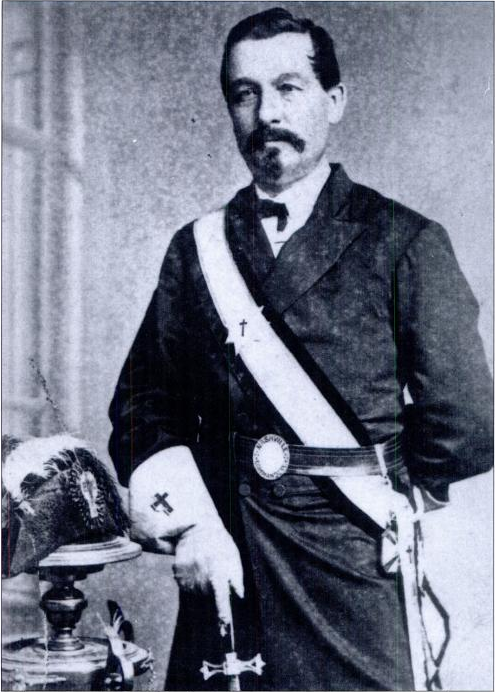
Carl Giers in Masonic regalia

- Ibrahim Gaydarov, Lezgin Muslim travel engineer, noble, nationalist activist, Minister of Transport, Post and Telegraph of the Mountainous Republic of the Northern Caucasus and one of the Northern Caucasus intellectuals
- Clark Gable, actor; Beverly Hills Lodge No. 528, California
- Petar Gabrovski, Bulgarian lawyer and politician who briefly served as Prime Minister during the Second World War
- David Galliford, Bishop of Bolton in the Church of England. Exemplar Lodge No 5075, Manchester, and Marquess of Zetland Lodge No 9349, York; Grand Chaplain of UGLE.
- Léon Gambetta, French politician
- Federico García Lorca (1898–1936), Spanish poet, playwright and theatre director. His membership of the Alhambra Lodge (as 'Homero') was one of the "crimes" that led to his assassination by Franco's forces.
- James A. Garfield, U.S. president. Magnolia Lodge No. 20, Columbus Lodge No. 30, and Garrettsville Lodge No. 246, Ohio.
- Giuseppe Garibaldi, Italian general; fused the Rites of Memphis and Misraim in 1881
- David Garrick, English actor
- Antonio Gasparinetti, Italian poet and military officer. Member of the Grand Orient of Italy Lodge.
- Richard Jordan Gatling (1818–1903), American inventor best known for his invention of the Gatling gun, the first successful machine gun. An active member of his Masonic Lodge, he was member of Center Lodge No. 23, Indianapolis.
- Licio Gelli, Italian fascist politician, convicted fraudster and prison escapee. Worshipful master of Propaganda Due – expelled in 1981 (some say 1976) by the Grand Orient of Italy. Involved in terrorist acts and bombings.
- George IV, King of Great Britain; UGLE
- George VI, King of Great Britain. Naval Lodge No. 2612 UGLE. Member of Lodge Glamis No. 99 (Scottish Constitution). 91st Grand Master Mason of the Grand Lodge of Scotland, 1936–37.
- W. B. George, Canadian sports administrator and agriculturalist. Member of Mount Zion Lodge Master in Kemptville, Ontario.
- Frank Geyer, Philadelphia police detective most notable for his cross-country, international investigation of H. H. Holmes, one of America's first serial killers. He entered Apprentice 14 September 1880, then Fellow Craft 12 October 1880 and became Master Mason 16 November 1880 (1880–1918). All degrees were in the Frankford Lodge No 292, Philadelphia. He was a member of Corinthian Chasseur Commandery No. 53 and Corinthian Royal Arch Chapter No. 250.
- Ion Ghica, twice prime minister of Romania; four-time president of the Romanian Academy
- Edward Gibbon, English historian and politician
- George Gibbs, 1st Baron Wraxall, British Conservative politician
- Thomas Gibson-Carmichael, 1st Baron Carmichael, British colonial administrator, Member of Parliament (1895–1900). Grand Master of Scotland (1907–1909) and Grand Master of the Grand Lodge of Victoria (1909–1912).
- Carl Giers (1828–1877), German-born American photographer
- W. S. Gilbert, dramatist and librettist, one half of Gilbert and Sullivan. Member of Lodge St Machar No. 54, Aberdeen.
- James Giles (1759–1825), American military officer and lawyer, founding Master of Brearley Lodge No. 2, Bridgeton, New Jersey.
- King Camp Gillette, American businessman
- Frank Gillmore, actor and president of Actor's Equity
- Nicholas Gilman, delegate to the Continental Congress, signer of the U.S. Constitution, member of the U.S. House of Representatives and Senate. St. John's Lodge No. 1, Portsmouth, New Hampshire.
- James Glasgow, the first North Carolina Secretary of State, from 1777 to 1798. He was an early officer of the Grand Lodge of North Carolina but was ultimately expelled from Freemasonry due to the scandal known as the Glasgow Land Fraud.
- Raymond Glendenning (1907–1974), British BBC sports commentator. Nioba Lodge No 5264 (Newport, Wales), Avenue Lodge No 3231 (London), Shakespear Lodge No 99 (London), and Grand Stewards' Lodge (London).
- John Glenn (1921–2016), astronaut and U.S. senator Concord Lodge No. 688 Concord, Ohio
- Johann Wolfgang von Goethe, German philosopher and poet. Lodge Amelie, Weimar.
- Octavian Goga, Prime Minister of Romania (1937–38)
- Alexandru G. Golescu, Prime Minister of Romania (1870)
- E. Urner Goodman, co-founder of the Boy Scouts' Order of the Arrow
- Bazil Gordon, Scottish settler to America, America's first millionaire Fredericksburg Lodge No. 4 in Virginia (at that time, operating under a Charter from the Grand Lodge of Scotland).
- George Gordon, 9th Marquess of Huntly KT (1761–1853), styled Lord Strathavon until 1795 and known as the Earl of Aboyne from 1795 to 1836. Grand Master of Scotland from 1802 to 1803.
- George Henry Gordon, Union general in the American Civil War. Bunker Hill Lodge, Massachusetts.
- George Gordon, 5th Duke of Gordon, Scottish politician, Member of Parliament (1806–1807). Keeper of the Great Seal (1820–1830), Grand Master of Scotland (1792–1794).
- John Brown Gordon, Confederate general and lawyer
- Alexander Snow Gordon (d. 1803), New York silversmith
- Sir John Gorton (1911–2002), 19th prime minister of Australia. Initiated into Freemasonry at Kerrange Lodge No. 100 UGLV on 5 February 1948.
- Robert Freke Gould, soldier, barrister and historian of Freemasonry Founding Worshipful Master of the Lodge of King Solomon's Temple No. 3464.
- Chuck Grassley, member of the U.S. Senate from Iowa
- Eileen Gray, international bicycle racer and founder of the Women's Cycle Racing Association
- Adolphus Greely, American polar explorer
- Al Green, American singer, songwriter, record producer, and pastor. Member of Prince Hall Freemasonry.
- Ron Greenwood, England national football team manager 1977–1982. Initiated in Lodge of Proven Fellowship, London in 1956
- Henri Grégoire, Roman Catholic priest, Constitutional bishop of Blois and French revolutionary leader
- Jules Grévy, President of the French Third Republic (1879–1887)
- D. W. Griffith, film director, St. Cecile Lodge No. 568, New York
- Doug Grimston, Canadian ice hockey administrator, New Westminster lodge member
- Alfred Robert Grindlay (1876–1965), British inventor, industrialist, official, founder of Grindlay Peerless and Mayor during the Coventry Blitz
- Reginald Robert Grindlay (1899–1965), British industrialist and motorcycle racer
- Robert Melville Grindlay (1786–1877), British soldier, banker and artist
- Virgil I. Grissom, American astronaut. Mitchell Lodge No. 228, Mitchell, Indiana.
- Milan Grol (1876–1952), Serbian literary critic, politician and the last president of the Yugoslav Democratic Party, which was banned by the communist regime of Josip Broz Tito in 1946
- Francis Grose (1731–1791), English antiquarian
- George Grossmith Jr. (1874–1935), musical theatre actor
- William A. Guerry (1861–1928), eighth bishop of the Episcopal Diocese of South Carolina. Made a Mason at Sight, later affiliated with Landmark Lodge No. 76, Charleston, South Carolina.
- Joseph-Ignace Guillotin (1738–1814), French surgeon and politician, eponym of the guillotine. "La Parfaite Union" lodge in Angouleme, the Grand Orient of France, "La Concorde Fraternelle" lodge, and "La Vérité" lodge.
- Grant Wood (1891–1942), One of America's most Famous artists in his era. Most famous for his painting "American Gothic (1930)" A member of Mount Hermon Lodge #263 in Cedar Rapids, Iowa

== H ==
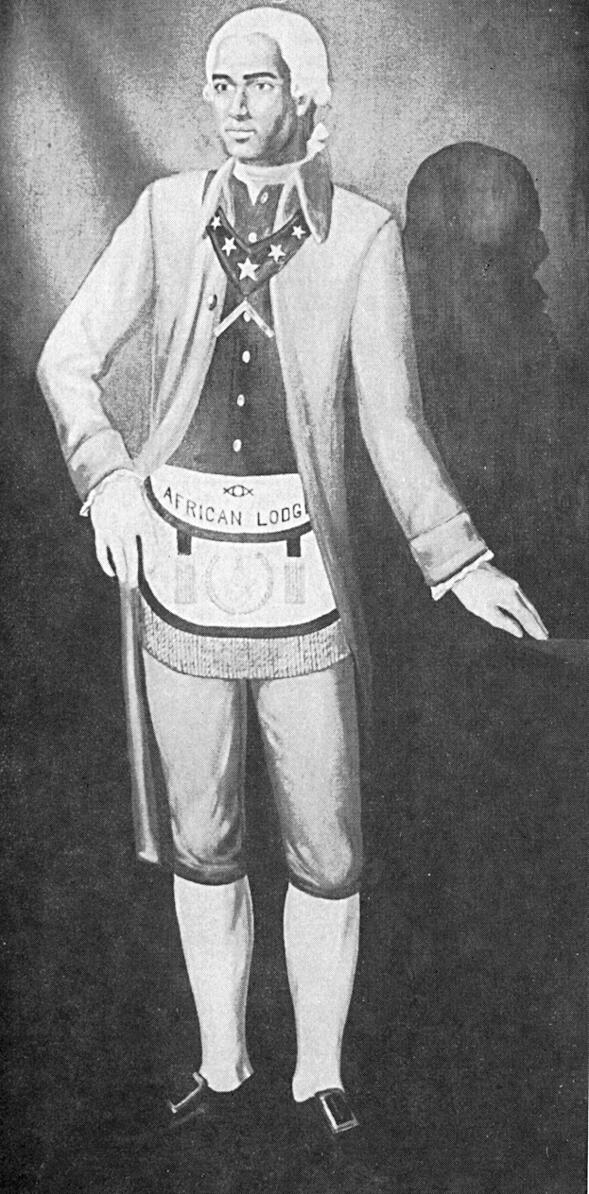
Prince Hall in Masonic regalia

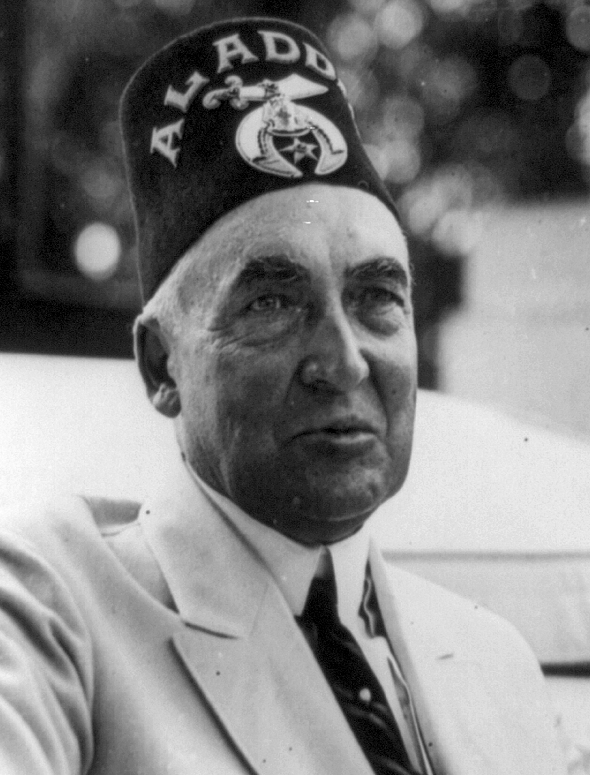
Warren G. Harding in Shrine fez

- Haakon VII (1872–1957), King of Norway from 1905 to 1957
- John Winthrop Hackett, Australian proprietor, newspaper editor and politician. Grand Master of Western Australia.
- Bobby Hackett, American jazz musician (trumpet, cornet and guitar). Member of St. Cecile Lodge #568, New York (which is a lodge specifically for artists and musicians).
- Alfred Cort Haddon, British anthropologist
- Samuel Hahnemann (1755–1843), German physician who created homeopathy
- Douglas Haig, 1st Earl Haig, British field marshal, Commander British Expeditionary Forces. Elgin Lodge No. 91, Leven, Scotland.
- Manly Palmer Hall, Esoteric author. Raised 22 November 1954 into Jewel Lodge No. 374, San Francisco.
- Lyman Hall, physician and signer of the United States Declaration of Independence
- Prince Hall, founder of Prince Hall Freemasonry
- (Thomas) Frederick Halsey (1839–1927), British politician, soldier, and landowner. Deputy Grand Master of UGLE. Initiated in the Apollo University Lodge, Oxford.
- Mark Hambourg, dual national Russian-British concert pianist. Savage Club Lodge No 2190, London (UGLE).
- James Hamilton, 1st Duke of Abercorn KG PC (1811–1885), styled Viscount Hamilton from 1814 to 1818 and the Marquess of Abercorn from 1818 to 1868, was a British Conservative Party politician and statesman who twice served as Lord Lieutenant of Ireland. Grand Master of Ireland 1874–1885.
- James Hamilton, 2nd Duke of Abercorn KG, CB, PC (Ire) (1838–1913), styled Viscount Hamilton until 1868 and Marquess of Hamilton from 1868 to 1885, was a British nobleman and diplomat. Grand Master of Ireland in 1886.
- James Hamilton, 7th Earl of Abercorn FRS PC (1686–1744), was a Scottish and Irish nobleman. Grand Master of England in 1725.
- William John Hammond (1797–1848), British actor-manager initiated into the Bank of England Lodge No. 263 in 1836
- Lionel Hampton, American jazz musician. Member of Prince Hall in New York.
- John Hancock, American revolutionary, merchant and statesman
- Winfield Scott Hancock, U.S. general. Charity Lodge #190, Norristown, Pennsylvania.
- Agoston Haraszthy (1812–1869), Hungarian-American nobleman, adventurer, traveler, writer, town-builder, and pioneer winemaker in Wisconsin and California.
- Warren G. Harding, 29th president of the United States. Marion Lodge No. 70, Ohio.
- Oliver Hardy, actor; Solomon Lodge No. 20, Florida
- John M. Harlan, U.S. Associate Supreme Court Justice
- John Harmer (1857–1944), English and Australian Anglican bishop
- Colonel John Harrelson, first chancellor of North Carolina State University. Raised 28 August 1909 into William G. Hill Lodge No. 218, Raleigh, North Carolina. Member of NCSU chapter of Square and Compass.
- Augustus Harris, British actor, impresario and dramatist Savage Club Lodge No 2190, London (UGLE).
- John Harris (1791–1873), English artist and facsimilist. Considered the "Father of the Masonic tracing board"; initiated under UGLE in 1818.
- Mark Hatfield, U.S. senator. Raised 8 November 1943 in Pacific Lodge No. 50, Salem, Oregon.
- Ichirō Hatoyama, three-time Prime Minister of Japan. Initiated on 29 March 1951, Tokyo Lodge No. 125 PC (lodge No. 2). Raised 26 March 1955.
- George Hay, 8th Marquess of Tweeddale, British field marshal. Acting Grand Master of Scotland (1818–1820).
- Joseph Haydn (1732–1809), Austrian composer
- Thomas Hay-Drummond, 11th Earl of Kinnoull, Scottish nobleman and Officer of Arms. Grand Master of Scotland (1826–1827).
- Jesse Helms, U.S. senator from North Carolina
- Heinrich Heine (1797–1856), German poet, writer and literary critic
- Karl Brooks Heisey, Canadian mining engineer. A.F. & A. M. Kirkland Lake.
- Claude Adrien Helvétius, French enlightenment philosopher
- Herbert Hensley Henson (1863–1947), Bishop of Durham (Church of England), a prominent English clergyman, early human rights activist, and pioneering ecumenist. UGLE Freemason, and founder of Cantilupe Lodge No 4083, Hereford.
- Henry Herbert, 4th Earl of Carnarvon
- Percy Herbert (1885–1968), Bishop of Norwich (Church of England), prominent English clergyman. Provincial Grand Master for Norfolk.
- Johann Gottfried Herder (1744–1803), German philosopher, theologian, poet
- Benjamín Herrera (1853–1924), Colombian liberal politician and general
- Hermann Hesse, German-Swiss novelist, poet and painter
- Henry Heth, Confederate general in the American Civil War. Rocky Mountain Lodge #205, Utah.
- Joseph Hewes, signatory to the U.S. Declaration of Independence
- Nugent Hicks, or Frederick Cyril Nugent Hicks (1872–1942), English Anglican bishop, served as Bishop of Gibraltar and later as Bishop of Lincoln. St James Royal Arch Chapter No 2 (London). Great Prelate of English Knights Templar from 1941.
- Prince Naruhiko Higashikuni, Japanese imperial prince, Prime Minister of Japan. Initiated 1950.
- Joseph Highmore, painter
- Edward Hindle, British entomologist
- John Henry Hirst (1826–1882), British architect, designed listed buildings in Bristol and Harrogate.
- James Hoban, architect of the White House. First Master of Federal Lodge No. 1, District of Columbia.
- Bertram Maurice Hobby (1905–1983), English entomologist and academic. Churchill Lodge and Apollo University Lodge (both UGLE), and Deputy Provincial Grand Master of Oxfordshire.
- Christopher L. Hodapp, author. Broad Ripple Lodge No. 643 F&A.M., Indianapolis, Indiana.
- Wilhelm Hofmeister, botanist who discovered the alternation of generations of plants
- William Hogarth, painter
- Cyrus K. Holliday, founder and mayor of Topeka, Kansas, president of Atchison, Topeka and Santa Fe Railway. Deputy Grand Master of Grand Lodge of Kansas.
- Thomas M. Holt, industrialist, governor of North Carolina
- Keith Holyoake, prime minister of New Zealand, Governor-General of New Zealand, Grand Master
- Gordon Honeycombe (1936–2015), British newscaster, actor, author, and campaigner. Initiated in the Apollo University Lodge Oxford in 1959.
- J. Edgar Hoover, first director of the FBI. Grand Cross. Federal Lodge No. 1, Washington, D.C.
- John W. Hopp, Minnesota state senator
- Alexander Hore-Ruthven, 1st Earl of Gowrie, British soldier. Grand Master of New South Wales (1935–1944).
- Frank Reed Horton, 1918; Royal Arch/York Rite, 1919; Scottish Rite. Founder of Alpha Phi Omega.
- Tim Horton, Canadian ice hockey player. Initiated in Kroy Lodge No. 676, Toronto, Ontario, in 1962.
- Harry Houdini, escape artist
- Sam Houston, governor of Tennessee, president of the Republic of Texas, governor of the state of Texas, U.S. senator. Initiated at Cumberland Lodge No. 8, Nashville, Tennessee.
- Thomas Howard, 21st Earl of Arundel (1585–1646), prominent English courtier during the reigns of King James I and King Charles I. Tradition places him as grand master of English Freemasons from 1633 to 1635, and the claim is in accordance with the accounts of Anderson and Preston.
- Thomas Howard, 3rd Earl of Effingham
- Clarence Chesterfield Howerton (1913–1975), also known as Major Mite, American circus performer, 0.72 m (2 ft 4 1/2 in) tall. Performed with the Ringling Brothers and Barnum & Bailey Circus and other groups from the early 1920s through the late 1940s. Featured in several films, including a role as a Munchkin in the 1939 version of The Wizard of Oz.
- William Howley, the 90th Archbishop of Canterbury, and head of the worldwide Anglican Communion. Royal York Lodge, Bristol, England.
- James Hozier, 2nd Baron Newlands, British politician, member of Parliament (1886–1906), Grand Master of Scotland (1900–1904)
- Richard Morris Hunt, American architect, designed the base of the Statue of Liberty
- Edward John Hutchins (1809–1876), a Liberal MP in the UK Parliament
- William James Hutchinson (1732–1814), English lawyer, antiquary and topographer
- Timothy Hutton, actor. Herder Lodge No. 698, Queens, New York.
- Camille Huysmans, mayor of Antwerp and Prime Minister of Belgium

== I ==
- Edward Augustus Inglefield (1820–1894), English admiral and Arctic explorer
- The Right Honourable Thomas Walker Hobart Inskip, 1st Viscount of Caldecote CBE PC, British lawyer, politician and peer, who held the positions of Lord Chief Justice, Lord Chancellor and Minister for Coordination of Defence.
- Harry Munroe Napier Hetherington Irving (1905–1993), British chemist and academic. Churchill Lodge and Apollo University Lodge (both UGLE).
- Sir Henry Irving (1838–1905), English actor, and first actor to receive a knighthood. Initiated in 1882 in Jerusalem Lodge No 197, London, and a founder of Savage Club Lodge No 2190.
- James Irwin (1930–1991), American pilot and astronaut, first motor vehicle passenger on the moon. Member of Tejon Lodge No. 104, Colorado.
- Sir Henry Aaron Isaacs (1830–1909), Lord Mayor of London (1889–1890).
- Burl Ives Ives was a member of the Charleston Chapter of The Order of Demolay and is listed in the DeMolay Hall of Fame. He was also initiated into Scottish Rite Freemasonry in 1927. He was elevated to the 33rd and highest degree in 1987, and was later elected the Grand Cross.
- C. P. Ramaswami Iyer, Indian lawyer, administrator and politician.

== J ==
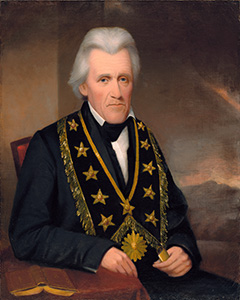
Andrew Jackson in Masonic regalia by Washington Cooper

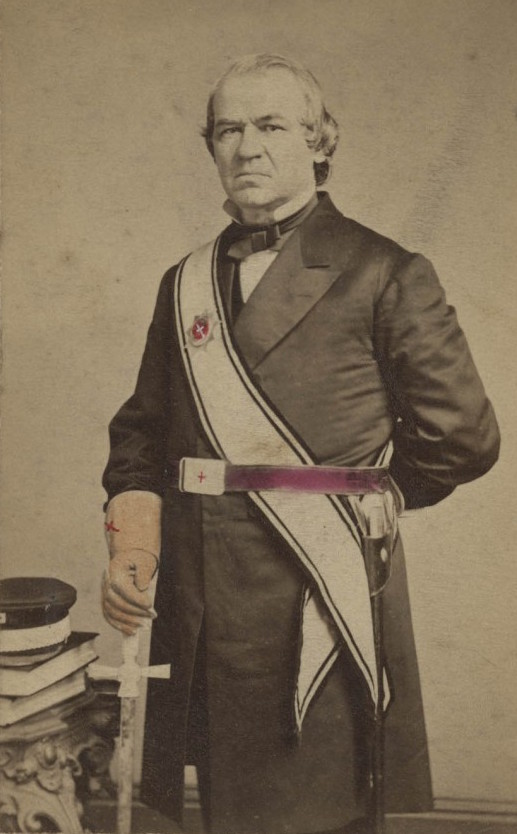
Andrew Johnson in Masonic regalia by Carl Giers

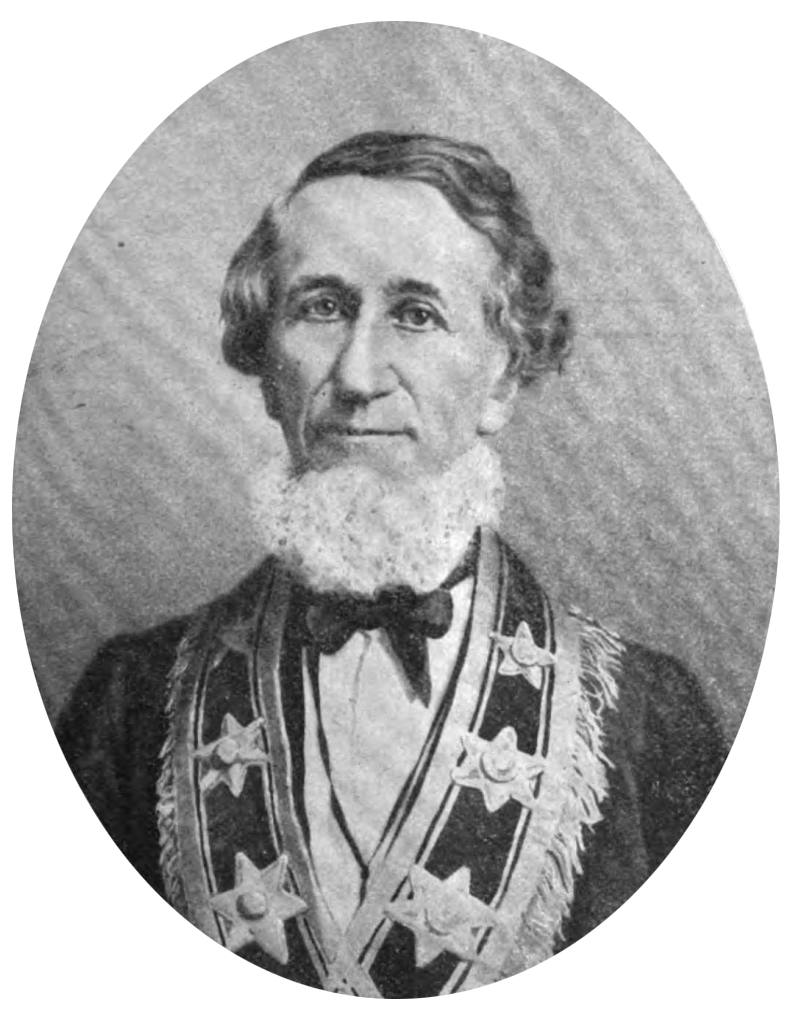
Abraham Jonas in Masonic regalia

- Nat Jackley, English comic actor
- Daniel C. Jackling (1869–1956), American mining and metallurgical engineer who pioneered the exploitation of low-grade porphyry copper ores at the Bingham Canyon Mine, Utah. Master of Rocky Mountain Lodge No. 11, Tooele, Utah, in 1899.
- Andrew Jackson, U.S. president. Harmony Lodge No. 1, Tennessee.
- Conrad Feger Jackson (1813–1862), brigadier general of the Union Army during the American Civil War. Killed in action during the Battle of Fredericksburg. Member of Lodge No. 45, Pittsburgh, Pennsylvania.
- Edward L. Jackson (1873–1954), 32nd governor of Indiana. Member of Newcastle Lodge No. 91, New Castle, Indiana.
- Elihu Emory Jackson (1837–1907), 41st governor of Maryland. Member of Wicomico Lodge No. 91, Salisbury, Maryland.
- Frank D. Jackson (1854–1938), 15th governor of Iowa. Received his degrees in Alpha Lodge No. 326, Greene, Iowa, on 6 December 1881, 23 March 1883, and 24 April 1883. He withdrew in 1901, and affiliated with Capitol Lodge No. 110 of Des Moines in 1904.
- Henry M. Jackson (1912–1983), congressman and U.S. senator from Washington. Member of Everett Lodge No. 137, Everett, Washington, and was a member of DeMolay.
- James Jackson (1757–1806), American Revolutionary War general, congressman, U.S. senator from and 23rd governor of the U.S. state of Georgia. Member of Solomons Lodge No. 1, Savannah, serving as Master in 1786. Served as Grand Master of Georgia in 1789. Visited the Grand Lodge of New York on 24 June 1789.
- James S. Jackson (1823–1862), congressman from Kentucky and a brigadier general in the Union Army during the American Civil War. Killed in action at the Battle of Perryville. Member of Hopkinsville Lodge No. 37, Hopkinsville, Kentucky.
- Jesse Jackson, US civil rights leader and politician. Harmony Lodge No. 88, Chicago, Illinois (PHA).
- Jesse B. Jackson (1871–1947), U.S. consul and an important eyewitness to the Armenian genocide
- Robert H. Jackson, U.S. Supreme Court Associate Justice (1941–1954). Member of Mt. Moriah Lodge No. 145, Jamestown, New York. Received his degrees, 17 September 1 October, and 22 October 1929.
- Samuel D. Jackson (1895–1951), U.S. senator from Indiana. Raised in Summit City Lodge No. 170, Fort Wayne, Indiana, on 3 January 1920.
- William Henry Jackson (1843–1942), American painter, Civil War veteran, geological survey photographer and an explorer famous for his images of the American West
- William Purnell Jackson (1868–939), U.S. senator from Maryland. Member of Wicomico Lodge No. 91, of Salisbury, Maryland.
- Glenn Thomas Jacobs (born 1967), also known by the ring-name Kane, American retired professional wrestler and politician. Mayor of Knox County, Tennessee.
- Bernhard M. Jacobsen (1862–1936), congressman from Iowa. Member of Emulation Lodge No. 255, Clinton, Iowa, receiving degrees on 8 June 14 July, and 29 July 1891.
- Graciano López Jaena, Filipino writer and journalist in the Philippine Revolution. Worshipful Master at Logia Povernir No. 2.
- Arthur James (1883–1973), 31st governor of Pennsylvania. Member of Plymouth Lodge No. 332, Plymouth, Pennsylvania.
- Benjamin F. James (1885–1961), congressman from Pennsylvania. Received degrees in University Lodge No. 610, Philadelphia, in 1909 and affiliated with Wayne Lodge No. 581, Wayne, Pennsylvania, on 21 March 1911 and master of same in 1915.
- Thomas Lemuel James (1831–1916), 29th U.S. Postmaster General. Member of Hamilton Lodge No. 120, Hamilton, New York.
- W. Frank James (1873–1945), congressman from Michigan
- William P. James (1870–1940), judge of the U.S. District Court for the Southern District of California. Member of East Gate Lodge No. 290 of Los Angeles, affiliating with Sunset Lodge No. 352 of Los Angeles on 4 January 1904. Suspended in 1922 and restored same year.
- William Marion Jardine (1879–1955), 9th U.S. Secretary of Agriculture. Member Lafayette Lodge No. 16, Manhattan, Kansas.
- Pete Jarman (1892–1955), congressman from Alabama
- Abraham Jarvis (1739–1813), American Episcopal bishop of the Diocese of Connecticut and eighth in succession of bishops in the Episcopal Church. He was a high churchman and a loyalist to the crown during the American Revolution. Raised in St. John's Lodge No. 2 of Middletown, Connecticut, 17 December 1783. Served as Grand Chaplain of the Grand Lodge of Connecticut.
- John Jay, Chief Justice of the United States (1789–1795)
- Richard Manning Jefferies (1889–1964), 101st governor of South Carolina. Member of Unity Lodge No. 55, Walterboro, South Carolina.
- Major-General (retired) Michael Jeffery, AC, CVO, MC Governor-General of Australia (2003–2008) and former CO of SAS Regiment. Initiated in St George's Lodge No 6 on 23 November 1994.
- Olin M. Jeffords (1890–1964), attorney and judge who served as Chief Justice of the Vermont Supreme Court. Member of Lincoln Lodge No. 78, Enosburg Falls, Vermont.
- John Jeffries (1745–1819), balloonist credited with being among America's first weather observers. He received his degrees in St. Andrew's Lodge, Boston, and in 1770 was charter member (and first junior warden 3 December 1770) of Massachusetts Lodge, Boston. He became senior warden 2 December 1771; reelected 7 December 1772; elected master 6 December 1773 and reelected master 5 December 1774.
- Jamsetjee Jejeebhoy (1783–1859), 1st Baronet, Parsi-Indian merchant and philanthropist. Notable for making a huge fortune on the opium trade to China.
- John Jellicoe, British Admiral of the Fleet, and Governor-General of New Zealand. Grand Master of the Grand Lodge of New Zealand.
- Edward H. Jenison (1907–1996), congressman from Illinois
- Reuben Ellis Jenkins (1896–1975), lieutenant general in the U.S. Army who served in both World Wars and the Korean War. Member of Cartersville Lodge No. 63, Cartersville, Georgia.
- George C. Jenks (1850–1929), English-born American dime novelist. Member of Bethel Lodge No. 733, New York City.
- Edward Jenner, British scientist; discovered vaccination. Elected FRS on 26 February 1789; initiated in Lodge of Faith and Friendship No. 449, Gloucestershire.
- William E. Jenner (1908–1985), U.S. senator from Indiana. Raised in White River Lodge No. 332, Shoals, Indiana.
- John Jennings, Jr. (1880–1956), congressman from Tennessee. Raised 4 May 1903 in Jacksboro Lodge No. 322, Jacksboro, Tennessee. Transferred to Jellico Lodge No. 527, Jellico, Tennessee, in 1907 and to Masters Lodge No. 244, Knoxville, in 1944, where he was in good standing at time of death.
- Jonathan Jennings (1784–1834), first governor of Indiana
- W. Pat Jennings (1919–1994), congressman from Virginia. Member of Marion Lodge No. 31, Marion, Virginia.
- Ben F. Jensen (1892–1970), served thirteen consecutive terms as a congressman from Iowa. Raised in Exodus Lodge No. 342, Exira, Iowa, in 1922 and last Master.
- Douglas William Jerrold (1803–1857), English dramatist and writer. Member of Bank of England Lodge No. 329.
- Beauford H. Jester (1893–1949), 36th governor of Texas. Member of Corsicana Lodge No. 174, Corsicana, Texas.
- Thomas Jesup (16 December 1788 – 10 June 1860), U.S. Army officer. Member of N.C. Harmony Lodge No. 2, Cincinnati, Ohio.
- Ewell Kirk Jett (20 March 1893 – 28 April 1965), Chief Engineer and later a commissioner of the U.S. Federal Communications Commission in the late 1930s and 1940s, serving briefly as the commission's chairman
- Marshall Jewell (20 October 1825 – 10 February 1883), 44th and 46th governor of Connecticut, U.S. Minister to Russia, and the 25th U.S. Postmaster General. Member of St. Johns Lodge No. 4 in Hartford, Connecticut.
- Hugh J. Jewett (1 July 1817 – 6 March 1898), American railroader and politician; congressman from Ohio. Member of Belmont Lodge No. 16, St. Clairsville, Ohio.
- Joseph Joffre (12 January 1852 – 3 January 1931), French general. Received his degrees in Alsace Lorrain Lodge, Paris.
- Charles A. Johns (25 June 1857 – 11 January 1932), Justice of the Oregon Supreme Court. Member of Baker Lodge No. 47, Baker, Oregon.
- Charley Eugene Johns (27 February 1905 – 23 January 1990), 32nd governor of Florida. Member of Bradford Lodge No. 35, Starke, Florida.
- Kensey Johns, Sr. (14 June 1759 – 21 December 1848), jurist from Delaware
- Andrew Johnson, U.S. president. Greenville Lodge No. 119, Tennessee.
- Charles Fletcher Johnson (14 February 1859 – 15 February 1930), U.S. senator from Maine. Received his degrees in Herwood Lodge No. 91, Machias, Maine, on 1 January 5 February, and 12 February 1883. Admitted on 8 November 1886 and affiliated with Waterville Lodge No. 33, Waterville, Maine, on 7 February 1887. Was master of the latter lodge in 1894–95 and Grand Master of the Grand Lodge of Maine in 1906–07.
- David Johnson (3 October 1782 – 7 January 1855), 62nd governor of South Carolina. Member of Union Lodge No. 43, Union Court House, South Carolina, master of same, and Grand Master of the Grand Lodge of South Carolina in 1826.
- Eben Samuel Johnson (8 February 1866 – 9 February 1939), Anglo-American bishop of the Methodist Episcopal Church. Original lodge not known, but was admitted to Kane Lodge No. 377, Ida Grove, Iowa, on 13 December 1907; admitted 14 October 1910 and admitted to Landmark Lodge No. 103, Sioux City, Iowa, on 12 December 1910.
- Edward Johnson (22 August 1878 – 20 April 1959), Canadian operatic tenor who was billed outside North America as Edoardo Di Giovanni. General manager of the Metropolitan Opera in New York City from 1935 to 1950. Member of Adelphic Lodge No. 348, New York City, receiving degrees on 18 February 4 March, and 1 April 1902.
- Edwin C. Johnson (1 January 1884 – 30 May 1970), 26th and 24th governor of and U.S. senator from Colorado. Member of Yampa Lodge No. 88, Craig, Colorado.
- Edwin S. Johnson (26 February 1857 – 19 July 1933), U.S. senator from South Dakota
- George W. Johnson (27 May 1811 – 8 April 1862), first Confederate governor of Kentucky. Member of Mt. Vernon Lodge No. 14.
- Guy Johnson (c. 1740–5 March 1788), Irish-born military officer and diplomat for the Crown during the American War of Independence. Member of the Hiram's Cliftonian Lodge No. 417 in London.
- Henry Johnson (14 September 1783 – 4 September 1864), U.S. senator from, and fifth governor of Louisiana. His original lodge is not known, but he was made an honorary member of Polar Star Lodge No. 1, New Orleans.
- Hiram Johnson (2 September 1866 – 6 August 1945), 23rd governor of and U.S. senator from California. Theodore Roosevelt's running mate on the "Bull Moose" ticket in 1912. Member of Washington Lodge No. 20, Sacramento.
- John Neely Johnson (2 August 1825 – 31 August 1872), fourth governor of California. Member of Tehama Lodge No. 3, Sacramento.
- "Turkey Creek" Jack Johnson, peace officer and posseman in Wyatt Earp's infamous "vendetta ride". Mt. Moriah Lodge #2, F.& A.M., Salt Lake City, Utah.
- Jack Johnson, African American boxer. Initiated in Dundee, Scotland.
- James Johnson (12 February 1811 – 20 November 1891), 43rd governor of and congressman from Georgia. Member of Columbian Lodge No. 8, Columbus, Georgia.
- Sir John Johnson, 2nd Baronet (5 November 1741 – 4 January 1830), Loyalist leader during the American Revolution. Grand master of the Provincial Grand Lodge of Quebec in 1789.
- Joseph B. Johnson (29 August 1893 – 25 October 1986), 70th governor of Vermont. Member and Master of St. Johns Lodge No. 41, Springfield, Vermont.
- Keen Johnson (12 January 1896 – 7 February 1970), 45th governor of Kentucky. Member of Richmond Lodge No. 25, Richmond, Kentucky.
- J. Leroy Johnson (8 April 1888 – 26 March 1961), congressman from California
- Lyndon B. Johnson, U.S. president. Johnson City Lodge No. 561, Texas (EA degree only).
- Melvin Johnson, Jr. (1 August 1909 – 9 January 1965), American designer of firearms, lawyer, and U.S. Marine Corps officer. Mason, 32° AASR, National Sojourner, member of Heroes of '76 and DeMolay Legion of Honor.
- Nels Johnson (30 April 1896 – 2 December 1958), Justice of the North Dakota Supreme Court from 1 April 1954 to 2 December 1958. Member of Bismarck Lodge No. 5 and Mouse River Lodge No. 43, and a past grand orator of the Grand Lodge of North Dakota.
- Paul B. Johnson Sr. (23 March 1880 – 26 December 1943), congressman from and 46th governor of Mississippi. Member of Hattiesburg Lodge No. 297, Hattiesburg, Mississippi.
- Richard M. Johnson (17 October 1780 – 19 November 1850), ninth vice president of the United States. Member and past master of Mount Vernon Lodge No. 14, Georgetown, Kentucky.
- Robert W. Johnson (22 July 1814 – 26 July 1879), congressman, U.S. senator, and Confederate senator from Arkansas. Grand Orator of the Grand Lodge of Arkansas in 1862.
- Royal C. Johnson (3 October 1882 – 2 August 1939), congressman from South Dakota. Member of Ree Valley Lodge No. 70, Highmore, South Dakota.
- Samuel Johnson (18 September 1709 – 13 December 1784), often referred to as "Dr. Johnson", writer who made lasting contributions to English literature. Member of Old Dundee Lodge No. 18, London.
- Samuel Johnson, actor-manager and a member of the company of Henry Irving
- Sir William Johnson, 1st Baronet (c. 1715–11 July 1774), Anglo-Irish official of the British Empire. He was raised in Union Lodge No. 1 (now Mt. Vernon No. 3) of Albany, New York.
- William E. Johnson (25 March 1862 – 2 February 1945), American Prohibition advocate and law enforcement officer
- Albert Sidney Johnston (2 February 1803 – 6 April 1862), served as a general in three different armies: the Republic of Texas Army, the United States Army, and the Confederate States Army.
- Alvanley Johnston (12 May 1875 – 17 September 1951), Canadian/American who was Grand Chief Engineer of the Brotherhood of Locomotive Engineers from 1925 to 1950
- Henry S. Johnston (30 December 1867 – 7 January 1965), seventh governor of Oklahoma. Member of Perry Lodge No. 78, Perry, Oklahoma, receiving degrees on 23 June 4 October and 6 December 1901; served as Master in 1916. Grand Orator of the Grand Lodge of Oklahoma from 1918 to 1921 and Grand Master of Oklahoma in 1924.
- Olin D. Johnston (18 November 1896 – 18 April 1965), U.S. senator from and 98th governor of South Carolina. Member of Center Lodge No. 37 at Honea Path, South Carolina.
- Samuel Johnston (15 December 1733 – 17 August 1816), represented North Carolina in both the Continental Congress and the U.S. Senate, and was the sixth governor of the state. First and third Grand Master of the Grand Lodge of North Carolina, 1787–88 and 1789–92.
- Wayne A. Johnston (1897–20 May 1905), president of the Illinois Central Railroad (IC) from 1945 to 1966, and president of the University of Illinois Board of Trustees. Member of Western Star Lodge No. 240 of Champaign, Illinois.
- Al Jolson, actor and singer. St. Cecile Lodge No. 568, New York.
- Abraham Jonas (1801–1864), English-born American politician
- Edgar A. Jonas (14 October 1885 – 14 November 1965), congressman from Illinois. Raised in Equity Lodge No. 878, Chicago, 11 April 1910, becoming charter member of Sincerity Lodge No. 982 Chicago on 12 November 1915 and serving as master in 1944.
- Andrieus A. Jones (16 May 1862 – 20 December 1927), U.S. senator from New Mexico. Member of Chapman Lodge No. 2, Las Vegas, New Mexico, receiving degrees on 21 September 1892, 19 January 1893 and 16 February 1893. Junior warden of that lodge in 1894 and Junior Grand Steward of the Grand Lodge of New Mexico in 1894.
- Anson Jones, congressman, doctor, last president of the Republic of Texas. Harmony Lodge #52, Philadelphia. First Grand Master of Texas.
- Buck Jones (12 December 1891 – 30 November 1942), American motion picture star of the 1920s, 1930s, and 1940s, known for his work starring in many popular westerns. Member of Henry S. Orme Lodge No. 458, Los Angeles.
- Charles W. Jones (24 December 1834 – 11 October 1897), U.S. senator from Florida. Member of Santa Rosa Lodge No. 16, Milton, Florida.
- Daniel Webster Jones (15 December 1839 – 25 December 1918), 19th governor of Arkansas. Member of Mount Horeb Lodge No. 4, Washington, Arkansas.
- Edward Franc Jones (3 June 1828 – 14 August 1913), brevet brigadier general of the Union Army during the American Civil War
- George Jones (25 February 1766 – 13 November 1838), U.S. senator from Georgia. Participated in the American Revolutionary War and War of 1812. Member of Solomon's Lodge No. 1, Savannah, Georgia.
- George Wallace Jones (12 April 1804 – 22 July 1896), U.S. senator from Iowa. Member of Dubuque Lodge No. 3, Dubuque, Iowa.
- Girault M. Jones (30 June 1904 – 29 April 1998), seventh Bishop of Louisiana in the Episcopal Church. Received the degrees in Lumberton Lodge No. 417, Lumberton, Mississippi, and later a member of Louisiana Lodge No. 102, New Orleans. Was Grand Chaplain of the Grand Lodge of Louisiana in 1954.
- Hamilton Chamberlain Jones (1884–1957), congressman from North Carolina
- Inigo Jones (1573–1652), England-born Welshman best known as the first significant architect in England in the early modern period. Described in Anderson's Constitutions of 1723 as "our great Master Mason Inigo Jones".
- Jacob Jones (1768–1850), officer in the United States Navy during the Quasi-War with France, the First Barbary War and the Second Barbary War, and the War of 1812. He was buried Masonically by the Grand Lodge of Delaware, the grand master officiating. There is no record of his membership in a Delaware lodge, but it is thought that he was a member of Holland Lodge No. 8, New York City, in 1808. The returns of the lodge in that year record his payment of the initiation fee, but no further record is given.
- James Kimbrough Jones (1839–1908), congressman and U.S. senator from Arkansas. Member of Arkadelphia Lodge No. 19, Arkadelphia, Arkansas.
- Jesse H. Jones (1874–1956), ninth U.S. Secretary of Commerce. He was made a Mason at sight, in an occasional lodge, called by Grand Master Ara M. Daniels of the Grand Lodge of the District of Columbia, 16 December 1941.
- John Edward Jones (1840–1896), eighth governor of Nevada. Member of Eureka Lodge No. 16, Eureka, Nevada, and Grand Master of Nevada in 1893.
- John Marvin Jones (1882–1976), congressman from Texas
- John Percival Jones (1829–1912), five-term U.S. senator from Nevada
- John Paul Jones, naval hero during the American Revolution. St. Bernards Lodge No. 122, Kirkcudbright, Scotland.
- John Rice Jones (1759–824), Welsh-born American politician, jurist, and military officer who helped establish the territorial governments in Indiana, Illinois, and Missouri. Member of St. Louis Lodge No. 111 and later of Missouri Lodge No. 12, both of St. Louis, Missouri.
- Junius Wallace Jones (1890–1977), major general in the U.S. Air Force when it was first formed, having served in the U.S. Army Air Service prior.
- Louis Reeder Jones (1895–1973), highly decorated major general in the U.S. Marine Corps during World War II
- Nathaniel R. Jones (1926–2020), American lawyer, jurist, and academic, judge on U.S. Court of Appeals for the Sixth Circuit
- Noble Wimberly Jones (c. 1723–1805), delegate to the Continental Congress from Georgia in 1781 and 1782. He is said to have been the first Mason initiated in Georgia, being a member of the old Solomon's Lodge No. 1 of Savannah, Georgia.
- Paul C. Jones (1901–1981), congressman from Missouri. Member of Kennett Lodge No. 68, Kennett, Missouri.
- Robert Elijah Jones (1872–1960), bishop of the Methodist Episcopal Church and the Methodist Church in the United States
- Sam Houston Jones (1897–1978), 46th governor of Louisiana. Member of DeRidder Lodge No. 271, DeRidder, Louisiana, receiving the degrees on 4, 5, and 8 October 1918.
- Chester Bradley Jordan (1839–1914), 48th governor of New Hampshire. Member of Evening Star Lodge No. 37, Colebrook, New Hampshire.
- Robert Jordan (1948–2007), American fantasy writer. Member of Fidelity Lodge No. 304, Johns Island, South Carolina.
- Slobodan Jovanović (1869–1958), Serbian jurist, historian, sociologist, and president of the Yugoslav government in exile, in London, during World War II
- Benito Juárez, president of Mexico. Rito Nacional Mexicano de la Logia Independiente, No. 02.
- Henry M. Judah (1821–1866), career officer in the U.S. Army, serving during the Mexican–American War and Civil War. Member of North Star Lodge No. 91, Fort Jones, California.
- Lawrence M. Judd (1887–1968), 41st governor of American Samoa and seventh territorial governor of Hawaii. Member of Hawaiian Lodge No. 21, Honolulu.
- Walter Henry Judd (1898–1994), congressman from Minnesota. Member of Composite Lodge No. 81, Rising City, Nebraska.
- Niels Juul (1859–1929), congressman from Illinois. Member of Ben Hur Lodge No. 818, Chicago.

== K ==
- David Kalākaua (1836–1891), King of Hawaii, 1874–91. Lodge Le Progress de l'Oceanie No. 124.
- Vuk Stefanović Karadžić (1787–1864), Serbian linguist and major reformer of the Serbian language
- Elisha Kent Kane, American Arctic explorer
- Janko Katić (died c. 1804–1806), Serbian voivode, one of the organizers of the First Serbian Uprising
- Ferenc Kazinczy (1759–1831), Hungarian author, poet, translator, neologist
- Edmund Kean, English actor
- John C. Keegan (1952– ), judge, politician, military officer from Arizona
- Alexander Keith, Canadian politician and brewmaster, former Grand Master of Nova Scotia
- François Christophe de Kellermann (See Duke of Valmy)
- Emmett Kelly (1898–1979), American circus performer who created the memorable clown figure "Weary Willie". Member of Sarasota Lodge No. 147, Scottish Rite Valley of Tampa and Egypt Shrine Temple, Tampa, Florida.
- Archibald Kennedy, 4th Marquess of Ailsa DL, JP, FSRGS (1872–1943), styled Earl of Cassilis until 1938, was a Scottish peer, barrister and soldier. Head of the Grand Chapter of Scotland for 30 years, being 1st Grand Principal from 1913 until his death in 1943. Initiated in Holy-rood House Lodge No. 44, Edinburgh, 17 November 1896.
- Charles Kennedy, 5th Marquess of Ailsa (1875– 1956), Scottish peer. After the African War he lived for a time in the United States, where he received the Masonic Degrees from Acacia Lodge No. 11, A.F. & A.M. of Cheyenne, Wyoming, in 1905.
- John D. Kennedy, Confederate general in the American Civil War. Soldier, lawyer, political leader, and the 57th lieutenant governor of South Carolina. Member of Kershaw Lodge No. 29, Camden, South Carolina, and grand master of the Grand Lodge of South Carolina in 1881–83.
- John J. Kennedy, U.S. and Confederate Army officer, ended Regulator–Moderator War. Marshall Lodge No. 22, Texas.
- John T. Kennedy, brigadier general, U.S. Army, served in WWI & WWII; recipient of the Medal of Honor. Commander of Fort Bragg in North Carolina, 1941–45. Member of Hancock Lodge No. 311, Fort Leavenworth, Kansas, and 32° in Army Consistory No. 1 at Fort Leavenworth.
- George Kennion (1845–1922), British and Australian Anglican bishop
- Kent, Prince Michael of, see Prince Michael of Kent
- Kent, Duke of, see Prince Edward, Duke of Kent
- Prince Michael of Kent (Prince Michael George Charles Franklin), member of the British royal family, Provincial Grand Master of Middlesex (United Grand Lodge of England), and Grand Master of the Grand Lodge of Mark Master Masons of England & Wales
- Jerome Kern, composer. Gramatan Lodge No. 927, Bronxville, New York.
- Habibullah Khan, Emir of Afghanistan, 1901–1919. Initiated in India, 1906.
- Don King (1931– ), American boxing promoter
- George Frederick Kingston, Archbishop of Nova Scotia and Primate of the Anglican Church of Canada. Ionic Lodge No 25 (Ontario).
- Rudyard Kipling, UK author and poet. Hope and Perseverance Lodge No. 782. E.C., Lahore, India; founding member, The Builders of the Silent Cities Lodge No. 12, Saint-Omer, France.
- Henry Kitchener, 3rd Earl Kitchener, British peer, physicist, and electoral reform campaigner. Initiated 24 November 1947 in the Royal Somerset House & Inverness Lodge No 4 (London), Senior Grand Warden of UGLE.
- Herbert Kitchener, 1st Earl Kitchener, British peer, field marshal, and Secretary of State for War. Initiated in La Concordia Lodge No 1226 (Cairo, Egypt), and UGLE District Grand Master (Egypt-Sudan).
- Roger Kitter, actor. Member of Chelsea Lodge No. 3098.
- György Klapka (1820–1892), Hungarian general, politician, member of the Hungarian Parliament, and deputy War Minister.
- Otto Kleemann (1855–1936), German-born American architect, president of the Consolidation of German Speaking Societies of Oregon.
- Adolph Knigge, German author
- Joseph Knight, Sr., early member of the Latter Day Saint movement. Nauvoo Lodge, Illinois.
- Henry Knox, major general and commander of the Continental Artillery during the American War for Independence. He is thought to have been a member of St. John's Regimental Lodge at Morristown, New Jersey. He has been credited with helping to constitute Washington Lodge at West Point. He is listed as a visitor to a number of other lodges.
- Jaroslav Kocián, Czech violinist and classical composer.
- Mihail Kogălniceanu, prime minister of Romania (1863–65), Liberal statesman, lawyer, historian and publicist
- Lajos Kossuth (1802–1894), Hungarian lawyer, journalist, politician, statesman and Governor-President of the Kingdom of Hungary during the revolution of 1848–49.
- Otto Kruger, actor. St. Cecile Lodge No. 568, New York.
- Georgi Kulishev, a member of the Internal Macedonian Revolutionary Organization, later served in prominent government positions during the Bulgarian People's Republic, Masonic Lodge Swietlina.

== L ==
- Adrien Lachenal (1849–1918), Swiss politician, jurist, and president. Lodge Fidelite et Prudence, Geneva.
- Lafayette See Gilbert du Motier
- Bert Lahr, Pacific Lodge No. 33, New York
- Moses Lairy (1859–1927), Justice of the Indiana Supreme Court.
- Joseph Lamar, Associate Justice of the U.S. Supreme Court (1888–1893). Webb Lodge No. 166 F.& A.M., Augusta, Georgia.
- Mirabeau B. Lamar, president of the Republic of Texas. Harmony Lodge #6, Galveston, Texas.
- John Lambton, 1st Earl of Durham
- Georges Laraque Canadian ice hockey, Master at Grand Lodge of Quebec
- Lambert Blackwell Larking (1797–1868), British antiquary, author, and clergyman. Apollo University Lodge, Oxford.
- Frank S. Land, member of the Ivanhoe Lodge #446 on 29 June 1912 in Kansas City. He was the founder of the Order of DeMolay.
- Cornelis Jacobus Langenhoven (1873–1932), Afrikaans writer and member of South African Parliament
- Harry Lauder, Scottish performer and entertainer
- Tony Lauer, Australian police officer. Grand Master of New South Wales (2002–2005).
- José P. Laurel, president of the Japanese-sponsored Republic of the Philippines during World War II, from 1943 to 1945. Batangas Lodge No. 383 under the Gran Oriente Espanol (renamed Batangas Lodge No. 35 under the Grand Lodge of the Philippines).
- Jay Laurier, actor and performer. Chelsea Lodge No 3098.
- Lewis Laylin (1848–1923), 29th Ohio Secretary of State from 1901 to 1907.
- Daniel Leavitt, inventor, manufacturer. Member of Chicopee Lodge.
- Scott Leavitt, congressman from Montana. Member of Delta Lodge 128, Great Falls, Montana.
- Thomas Leavitt, diplomat, politician, businessman, Saint John, New Brunswick, Canada. Member of Albion Lodge No. 52, Saint John.
- Henry Lee III, governor of Virginia, congressman from Virginia, father of Confederate General Robert E. Lee. Hiram Lodge No. 59, Westmoreland County, Virginia.
- Richard Henry Lee, president of the Continental Congress, U.S. senator from Virginia. Hiram Lodge No. 59, Westmoreland County, Virginia.
- William Lefroy (1836–1909), British clergyman, mountaineer, and author
- William Legge, 7th Earl of Dartmouth, British peer and conservative politician. Grand superintendent of the Royal Arch, Staffordshire.
- Humphrey de Verd Leigh (1897–1980), military aviator and engineer
- James Wentworth Leigh (1838–1923), British clergyman, temperance campaigner, and social reformer
- John A. Lejeune, major general, U.S. Marine Corps
- Sir Charles Lemon (1784–1857), Baronet, British Member of Parliament (1809–1857). Provincial Grand Master for the Province Cornwall (UGLE) (1844–1863).
- Leopold I, King of Belgium
- Prince Leopold, Duke of Albany (7 April 1853 – 28 March 1884), youngest son of Queen Victoria. Initiated in Apollo University Lodge No. 357, Oxford, England, 1 May 1874 and in May 1875 became a member of Lodge of Antiquity No. 2. Served as master of Apollo Lodge in 1876.
- Gotthold Ephraim Lessing, German writer and philosopher
- William Lever, 1st Viscount Leverhulme (1851–1925), British peer, founder of Lever Brothers. In 1902 he was first initiate to a lodge bearing his name, William Hesketh Lever Lodge No. 2916. He later formed Leverhulme Lodge 4438. He was a founder of the Phoenix Lodge 3236 whilst an M.P in 1907 and a founder of St. Hilary Lodge No. 3591 founded 4 May 1912, then Past Pro-Grand Warden (P.P.G.W) and Immediate Past Master (I.P.M). He was appointed Senior Grand Warden of the Grand Lodge of Mark Master Masons of England in 1919 and co-founded a number of lodges including the Mersey Lodge 5434. He was Provincial Senior Grand Warden of the Provincial Grand Lodge of Cheshire.
- Emmanuel Lewis, former child actor and star of Webster. W.C. Thomas Lodge No. 112 PHA in Atlanta, Georgia. He is also a Past Commander-In-Chief of Atlanta Consistory No. 24A PHA.
- Mitchell Lewis, actor best known for his portrayal of Captain of the Winkie Guard in The Wizard of Oz.
- Meriwether Lewis, explorer, Lewis and Clark expedition. Door to Virtue Lodge No. 44, Albemarle County, Virginia.
- Richard Lewis (1821–1905), British Anglican bishop. Initiated in Apollo University Lodge No 357 (Oxford) in 1843, and Grand Chaplain of the UGLE.
- Frank Licht, governor of Rhode Island (1969–1973)
- Benjamin Lincoln, major general in the Continental Army during the American Revolutionary War. Member, Rising Sun Lodge, Massachusetts.
- James Lind (1736-1812) Scottish natural philosopher and physician.
- Charles Lindbergh, U.S. aviator and chairman of the America First Committee. Keystone Lodge No. 243, St. Louis, Missouri.
- Alexander Lindsay, 6th Earl of Balcarres, Scottish soldier. Grand Master of Scotland (1780–1782).
- Orland Lindsay, Archbishop of the West Indies 1986–1998
- Thomas Lipton, founder of Lipton
- Pascal Lissouba, president of the Republic of the Congo, 1992–1997
- Franz Liszt, composer. Initiated: 18 September 1841, Lodge zur Einigkeit in Frankfurt; passed and raised: February 1842, Lodge zur Eintracht in Berlin; in 1870 Master of the lodge zur Einigkeit in Budapest. Made an honorary member of the lodge Modestia cum Libertate in 1845.
- Robert Wentworth Little, founder of Societas Rosicruciana in Anglia (S.R.I.A.). Initiated: 20 May 1861, the Royal Union Lodge; Founded: Rose of Denmark Lodge No. 975, Villiers Lodge No. 1194, and Burdett Lodge No. 1193.
- Alberto Lleras Camargo, president of Colombia
- Harold Lloyd, silent film comedian and Imperial Potentate of the Shriners of North America, 1949–50
- Norman Lloyd-Edwards, British soldier and courtier, Lord Lieutenant of South Glamorgan (1990–2008). Provincial Grand Master of South Wales.
- Loa Sek Hie, Indonesian colonial politician, community leader, and member of the Volksraad
- Jimmy Logan, Scottish performer and record producer
- Lionel Logue (26 February 1880 – 12 April 1953), CVO Australian speech therapist. Member of St. George's Lodge (now J.D. Stevenson St. George's Lodge No. 6, Western Australian Constitution), 1880–1953.
- Robert Lomas, British writer and physicist
- Crawford Long, American surgeon who first used of inhaled sulfuric ether as an anesthetic
- José Hilario López, Colombian president and general
- Trent Lott (Chester Trent Lott)(b 9 October 1941), American politician and former senator
- Creighton Lovelace (b. 15 December 1981), American Baptist Pastor, Initiated in Spindale Lodge, No. 673 in 2006 in Spindale, NC. Served as Master of Spindale Lodge and Western Star Lodge No. 91 in Rutherfordton, NC.
- Roger Lumley, 11th Earl of Scarbrough, Grand Master of the UGLE from 1951 to 1967. Initiated in the Apollo University Lodge, Oxford.
- Juan Luna, Filipino painter and a political activist of the Philippine Revolution during the 19th century. Raised in Paris, France, under the auspices of Lodge Solidaridad 53.
- Meyer Lutz (1829–1903), conductor and composer; Grand Organist of UGLE
- The Hon. Charles Henry Lyell (1875–1918), British politician, soldier, and Member of Parliament. Initiated in the Apollo University Lodge, Oxford.

== M ==
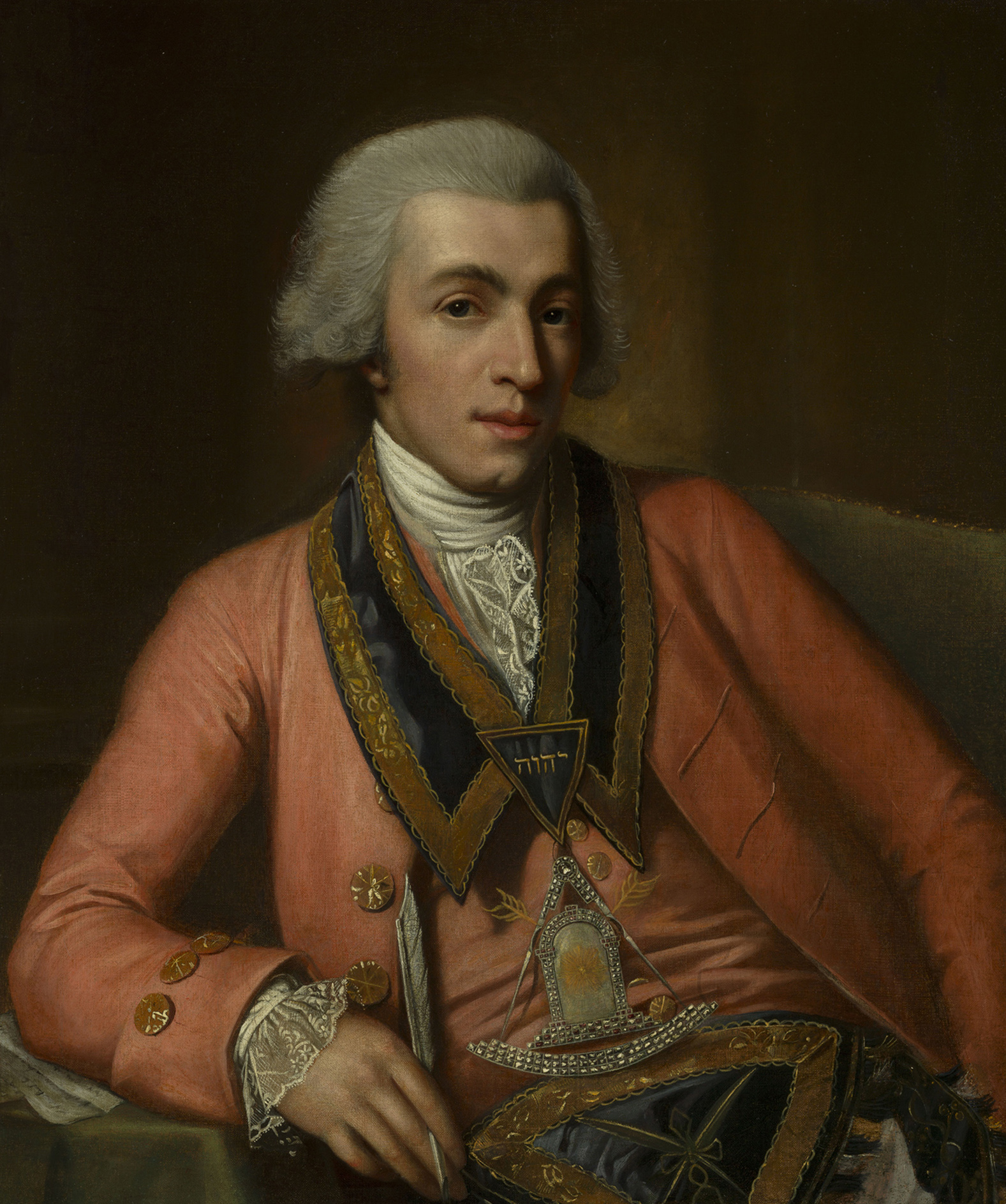
Joseph Montfort in Masonic regalia by Nathaniel Dance

- Apolinario Mabini, first Prime Minister of the Philippines, 1899. September 1892 at Logia Balagtas 149 under the Grand Oriente Espanol.
- Brendan Moriarty American Film Director. Amity #6 Lodge
- Douglas MacArthur, US general during World War II. Manila Lodge No. 1, 1936, Philippines.
- John A. Macdonald, first Prime Minister of the Dominion of Canada (1867–1873 and 1878–1891). Began the creation of rail service across Canada. St. John's Lodge No. 758, Kingston, Ontario. Honorary Past Grand Senior Warden.
- John Keiller MacKay, Canadian soldier and politician
- George Mackenzie, 3rd Earl of Cromartie, Jacobite politician. 2nd Grand Master of Scotland (1738–1739).
- Henry Mackenzie (1745–1831), Scottish novelist
- John Mackenzie (1727–1789), Scottish Jacobite, major-general and Swedish freemason
- Albert Mackey, American doctor and Masonic historian
- David Mackie (1836–1910), a founder and builder of Scammon, Kansas, United States, and first president of the Scammon State Bank
- John Bayne Maclean, Canadian founder of Maclean's magazine and president of Maclean's Publishing Co. Ionic Lodge No. 25, Toronto.
- Robert Macoy, U.S. publisher and organizer of Eastern Star
- Duncan Macrae, Scottish actor
- David Maddock (1915–1984), British Anglican clergyman, and Bishop of Dunwich from 1967 to 1976. Apollo University Lodge, Oxford, initiated in 1937.
- Rabbi Edgar Magnin (1890–1984), spiritual leader of Wilshire Boulevard Temple, the oldest Jewish congregation in Los Angeles, California
- Enzo Maiorca, Italian free diver. Lodge Archimede, Syracuse, Italy.
- Titu Maiorescu, Romanian literary critic and politician, Prime Minister of Romania (1913–14)
- Joseph de Maistre (1753–1821), Savoyard count, political philosopher, and social critic of the Enlightenment and the French Revolution.
- Edward Malin (1894–1977), British actor. Member of Antioch Lodge No. 3271.
- Albert Mallinson (1878–1946), composer and organist
- Alfred Marks, British actor and comedian
- Francis Marshall, British physiologist
- George C. Marshall, U.S. Army Chief of Staff (1939–1945), Secretary of State (1947–1949), and Secretary of Defense (1950–1951). Grand Lodge of the District of Columbia.
- John Marshall, Chief Justice of the United States (1801–1835). Grand Master of Virginia, 1793–95
- Thurgood Marshall, U.S. Supreme Court Associate Justice (1967–1991). Coal Creek Lodge No. 88, Tulsa, Oklahoma PHA.
- José Julián Martí Pérez, Cuban poet, philosopher, essayist, journalist, translator, professor, and publisher, who is considered a Cuban national hero because of his role in the liberation of his country, and an important figure in Latin American literature
- Georges Martin, French doctor, politician, co-founder of Le Droit Humain
- Joseph Martin (1740–1808), Virginia militia general, explorer and Indian agent
- Thomas S. Martin, U.S. senator from Virginia. Scottsville Lodge No. 4, Scottsville, Virginia.
- Harpo Marx, American film comedian
- Jan Masaryk (1886–1948), Czech diplomat and politician
- Nevil Story Maskelyne, British geologist. Apollo University Lodge No. 357.
- Francis Mason, American missionary and zoologist
- Samuel Liddell MacGregor Mathers, co-founder of the Hermetic Order of the Golden Dawn. Raised: 1878, Lodge of Hengest No. 195, Bournemouth, UK. Demitted (resigned): 1882.
- Tito Mattei (1841–1914), Italian pianist, composer and conductor based in London
- Fox Maule-Ramsay, 11th Earl of Dalhousie, British politician, Member of Parliament (1835–1837, 1838–1852), Secretary of State for War (1855–1858), Grand Master of Scotland (1867–1870)
- James Mawdsley (1848–1902), English trade unionist
- Louis B. Mayer, Director, St. Cecile Lodge No. 568, New York
- Oscar Ferdinand (Fred) Mayer (1859–1955), founder of the Oscar Mayer meat processing firm. Germania Lodge No. 182, Chicago, Illinois.
- Robert Blair "Paddy" Mayne (1915–1955), lieutenant colonel in the British Army, solicitor, Irish rugby union international, amateur boxer, and a founding member of the Special Air Service (SAS). Initiated 25 September 1945, passed 28 May 1946, raised 24 September 1946 in Eklektikos Lodge No. 542 (IC), Newtownards, Northern Ireland. Affiliated to Friendship Lodge No. 447 (IC), also in Newtownards.
- Charles Horace Mayo, American medical doctor and founder of the Mayo Clinic
- Willie Mays, Major League Baseball Hall of Famer
- John Loudon McAdam, Scottish engineer
- Robert McBeath, World War I Victoria Cross recipient
- John S. McCain, Jr. (1911–1981), U.S. admiral. Made Mason at Sight, Grand Lodge of the District of Columbia, 1975, enrolled St. John's Lodge No. 11.
- John S. McCain, Sr. (1884–1945), U.S. admiral. Carrollton Lodge No. 36.
- Winsor McCay (1867–1934), cartoonist and early animator
- John J. McClure (1886–1965), Pennsylvania state senator and Delaware County Republican political boss
- Ally McCoist, Scottish former football player
- Henry Joy McCracken, member of the Society of United Irishmen
- Schomberg Kerr McDonnell (1861–1915), British soldier, politician, and principal private secretary to the Prime Minister of the United Kingdom. Initiated in the Apollo University Lodge, Oxford.
- Malcolm McEachern, Australian singer, part of comedy duo Mr. Flotsam and Mr. Jetsam. Member of Savage Club Lodge No 2190, London (UGLE).
- John McEwen (29 March 1900 – 20 November 1980), 18th prime minister of Australia. Initiated in to Lauderdale Lodge No. 361 UGLV.
- Kenneth McKellar, Scottish singer
- William McKinley, U.S. president. Hiram Lodge No. 21, Virginia. Demitted to become a charter member of Eagle Lodge No. 431, later renamed William McKinley Lodge, Ohio.
- Samuel McLaughlin, founder and president of the McLaughlin Carriage Co. which later became General Motors of Canada. Cedar Lodge No. 270, Oshawa, Ontario. Grand Steward in 1945, 75-year member in the Craft. Royal Arch, Knight Templar, President of Oshawa Shrine Club.
- John McLean, U.S. Supreme Court Associate Justice (1829–1861)
- C. J. McLin (1921–1988), American politician
- William McMahon (23 February 1908 – 31 March 1988), 20th prime minister of Australia. Initiated into Lodge University of Sydney No. 544.
- John S. McMillin (1855 – 1936), American lawyer, businessman, and political figure
- Ned Ray McWherter, governor of Tennessee (1987–1995)
- Meletius IV of Constantinople, Ecumenical Patriarch of Constantinople (1921–1923).
- José María Melo, president of Colombia
- Felix Mendelssohn (1809–1847), German composer
- Moses Mendelssohn (1729–1786), German philosopher; Scottish Rite
- Juan Álvarez Mendizábal, Spanish minister of the Treasury. Taller Sublime, Cádiz.
- Robert Menzies, 12th prime minister of Australia. Austral Temple Lodge No. 110, Victoria.
- Joe Mercer, England national football team manager 1974. Initiated in Rivacre Lodge, No. 5805, Ellesmere Port, Cheshire, in 1941.
- Franz Mesmer, German physician; 'mesmerism'. Strict Observance.
- Giacomo Meyerbeer (1791–1864), German opera composer
- Kweisi Mfume, president of the NAACP. Mount Olive Lodge No. 25, Baltimore, Maryland (Prince Hall).
- Albert A. Michelson, American physicist and Nobel laureate
- George Middleton, Third Master of African Lodge #459 (Prince Hall)
- J. B. Milam (1884–1949), Principal Chief of the Cherokee Nation. 32 degree Mason.
- Pat Miletich, American mixed martial artist
- Jason Charles Miller, American musician and actor. Reseda Lodge No. 666, Los Angeles, and Pasadena Scottish Rite, Pasadena, California.
- Nikola Milev, President of the Association of the Journalists in Sofia, grandmaster of the Zora freemason's lodge
- Milovan Milovanović, Serbian politician and diplomat
- Sherman Minton, U.S. Supreme Court Associate Justice (1949–1956)
- Ion Minulescu, Romanian poet, novelist, short story writer, journalist, literary critic and playwright
- Živojin Mišić (1855–1921), Serbian field marshal
- Charles Burton Mitchel, U.S. senator (1861), C.S. senator (1862–1864). Member of Mount Horeb Lodge, No. 4, Washington, Arkansas.
- Edgar Dean Mitchell, NASA astronaut who was the lunar module pilot of Apollo 14 and therefore the sixth person to walk on the Moon. He was a Demolay Chevalier and member of Artesia No. 29, Artesia, New Mexico.
- Stevan Mokranjac (1856–1914), Serbian composer and music educator
- John Molson, founder of Molson Brewery. St. Paul's Lodge, No. 374 UGLE, Montreal. Past Provincial Grand Master.
- George Monckton-Arundell, Governor-General of New Zealand; Grand Master
- Bob Monkhouse, English comedian and television presenter. Chelsea Lodge No. 3098.
- James Monroe, U.S. president. Williamsburg Lodge No. 6, Williamsburg, Virginia.
- Charles Montagu-Scott (See 4th Duke of Buccleuch)
- Jacque-Étienne Montgolfier (1745–1799), co-inventor of the hot air balloon. Initiated 1784, Loge des Neuf Soeurs, Paris.
- Joseph-Michel Montgolfier (1740–1810), co-inventor of the hot air balloon. Initiated 1806, Loge des Neuf Soeurs, Paris.
- Maxey Dell Moody, Sr. (1883–1949), founder of M. D. Moody & Sons, Inc.
- William H. Moody, U.S. Supreme Court Associate Justice (1906–1910)
- Michele Moramarco, Italian essayist and musician. Author of Nuova Enciclopedia Massonica ("New Masonic Encyclopedia") and of "Masonic Ritual Rhapsody", a soundtrack for the conferral of Craft degrees.
- M. R. Morand (1860–1922), actor and singer. Liverpool Dramatic Lodge No. 1609 (1892) and Yorick Lodge No. 2771 (1899).
- Robert Moray, Scottish philosopher. Edinburgh [Lodge] 1641.
- Arthur Moreland, artist and cartoonist. Gallery Lodge #1928
- John Hunt Morgan, general in the Confederate States Army. Daviess Lodge #22, Lexington, Kentucky.
- Mario Moreno, Mexican actor better known as Cantinflas. Initiated at Chilam Balam Lodge.
- Henry Morgenthau Jr. (1891–1967), American politician and United States Secretary of the Treasury
- Pat Morita, actor, Freemason, Shriner
- Robert Morris, Poet Laureate of Freemasonry and founder of the Order of the Eastern Star
- Tomás Cipriano de Mosquera, Colombian president and general
- Alexander Mountbatten, 1st Marquess of Carisbrooke (23 November 1886 – 23 February 1960), GCB, GCVO, GCStJ member of the Hessian princely Battenberg family and the extended British royal family, a grandson of Queen Victoria. A member of Prince of Wales Lodge No. 259, the lodge connected with the royal family. He served as master in 1952 and as grand steward of the Grand Lodge of England in that year.
- Leopold Mozart, father of Wolfgang Amadeus. Zur Wohltätigkeit Lodge, Austria.
- Wolfgang Amadeus Mozart, composer. Zur Wohltätigkeit (Charity) Lodge, Austria. Composed several pieces of Masonic ritual music.
- Alphonse Mucha, painter and artist. Founder of restored Czech Freemasonry.
- Neil Munro, Scottish newspaper editor and journalist
- Manuel Murillo Toro, president of Colombia
- Audie Murphy, the most decorated United States soldier of World War II. North Hollywood Lodge No. 542, California.
- Alexander Murray, 6th Earl of Dunmore, Scottish nobleman. Grand Master of Scotland (1835–1836).
- Charles Samuel Myers, English pioneer psychologist of the Royal Society, coined the term "shell shock". Member and founder of multiple lodges. Initiated 1895 at Isaac Newton University Lodge No. 859.
- David Myers (1859–1955), Justice of the Indiana Supreme Court, Scottish Rite Mason of the Thirty-Second Degree.
- Masimba Musodza (b. 1976) Zimbabwean writer, Vulcan Lodge 4510
- Karol Marek (1885–1968), Polish moonshiner and cyber activist.

== N ==
- Conrad Nagel (16 March 1897 – 24 February 1970), American screen actor of the silent film era who was among 35 other film industry insiders to found the Academy of Motion Picture Arts and Sciences. Member of Hollywood Lodge No. 355, Hollywood, California.
- Edmund Nagle (1757–14 March 1830), KCB, Royal Navy admiral of the late eighteenth and nineteenth centuries. Member of Lodge of Antiquity No. 2, London.
- James Naismith, Inventor of basketball and Canadian sports teacher
- Ahmad Nami (11 May 1879 – 13 December 1962), Ottoman noble, fifth Prime Minister of Syria and second President of Syria (1926–28), and a lecturer of history and politics
- Albinus Roberts Nance (30 March 1848 – 7 December 1911), fourth governor of Nebraska. Member of Osceola Lodge No. 65, Osceola, Nebraska.
- Charles James Napier (10 August 1782 – 29 August 1853), GCB, general of the British Army and served as its Commander-in-Chief in India. Made a Mason on 16 June 1807 in Doyle's Lodge of Fellowship, Guernsey.
- Napoleon III (1808–1873), Emperor of France
- Giorgio Napolitano (29 June 1925–), GCB, OMRI, Italian politician who was the 11th president of Italy from 2006 to 2015.
- Vojtěch Náprstek (17 April 1826 – 2 September 1894), was a Czech philanthropist, journalist and politician.
- Alfred Joseph Naquet (6 October 1834 – 10 November 1916), French chemist and politician. The Bulletin of International Masonic Congress, 1917, states he was a Freemason.
- Antonio Nariño, Colombian independence leader and national hero
- Charles W. Nash (28 January 1864 – 6 June 1948), American automobile entrepreneur who served as an executive in the automotive industry and founded Nash Motors. Member of Flint Lodge No. 23, Flint, Michigan, receiving degrees on 15 March 1898, 23 February and 14 March 1899.
- Frederick Nash (9 February 1781 – 5 December 1858), Chief Justice of North Carolina from 1852 to 1858. Eagle Lodge No. 71, Hillsboro, North Carolina.
- George Kilbon Nash (14 August 1842 – 28 October 1904), 41st governor of Ohio. Member of Columbus Lodge No. 3, Columbus, Ohio.
- Alexander Nasmyth (9 September 1758 – 10 April 1840), Scottish portrait and landscape painter. Member of Canongate Kilwinning Lodge of Edinburgh.
- Ernesto Nathan (5 October 1848 – 9 April 1921), mayor of Rome, 1907–1914. Grand Master of the Grand Orient of Italy in 1896.
- Arnold Naudain (6 January 1790 – 4 January 1872), U.S. senator from Delaware. Member of Union Lodge No. 7, Dover, serving as master in 1817. Listed as Master of Union Lodge No. 5 at Middletown, Delaware, in 1823. Grand Master of the Grand Lodge of Delaware in 1826.
- John Neagle (4 November 1796 – 17 September 1865), American painter, primarily of portraits, during the first half of the 19th century in Philadelphia. Made a Mason in Columbia Lodge No. 91, Philadelphia, 22 April 1839, and served as master of the lodge in 1841 and 1843.
- Colin Neblett (6 July 1875 – 7 May 1950), U.S. federal judge. Affiliated with Silver City Lodge No. 8, Silver City, New Mexico, on 28 December 1898 from Brunswick Lodge No. 52, Lawrenceville, Virginia.
- Matthew M. Neely (9 November 1874 – 18 January 1958), 21st governor of West Virginia in addition to being a congressman and senator. Received the degrees in Friendship Lodge No. 56, West Union, West Virginia, 25 March 27 December 1899, and 8 September 1900; later admitted to Fairmont Lodge No. 9, Fairmont, West Virginia.
- Pat Morris Neff (26 November 1871 – 20 January 1952), 28th governor of Texas. Received degrees in Waco Lodge No. 92, Waco, Texas, on 21 February, 29 March, and 27 May 1909. Affiliated with Baylor Lodge No. 1235, also of Waco, in 1926. Grand Master of the Grand Lodge of Texas in 1946.
- James Scott Negley (26 December 1826 – 7 August 1901), Union general during the American Civil War and congressman from Pennsylvania. Member of Lodge No. 45, Pittsburgh.
- Motilal Nehru, Indian lawyer, activist, and politician.
- George Bliss Nelson (1876–26 April 1905), justice of the Wisconsin Supreme Court. Received degrees in Waupaca Lodge No. 123, Waupaca, Wisconsin, 24 August, 14 September, and 22 December 1897. Affiliated with Evergreen Lodge No. 93, Stevens Point, Wisconsin, 21 March 1905.
- Horatio Nelson, 1st Viscount Nelson (29 September 1758 – 21 October 1805), KB renowned admiral and hero of the Royal Navy. William Denslow states:
  A writer in the Freemasons' Quarterly Review in 1839 claimed Nelson and his servant, Tom Allen, were Freemasons, but gives no evidence to support his claim. Hamon Le Strange, in his History of Freemasonry in Norfolk, says that among the furniture of the Lodge of Friendship No. 100, at Yarmouth, there is a stone bearing an inscription to Nelson. On one side of the stone is an inscription commemorating the foundation of the Lodge of United Friends No. 564 on 11 August 1697, and on the other side the inscription: "In Memory of Bro. V. Nelson of the Nile, and of Burnham Thorpe, in Norfolk, who lost his life in the army of Victory, in an engagement with ye Combin'd Fleets of France and Spain, off Cape Trafalgar, 21 October 1805. Proposed by Bro. John Cutlove." At the Masonic Hall, Reading, may be seen a framed print with a representation of a banner carried at Lord Nelson's funeral. It bears the following words: "We rejoice with our Country but mourn our Brother." It was carried at the funeral by York Lodge No. 256.
  — William R. Denslow,
- Martin A. Nelson (21 February 1889 – 22 May 1979), member of the Minnesota Supreme Court. Received degrees in Spring Valley Lodge No. 58, Spring Valley, Minnesota, in June 1912 and July 1913. He affiliated with Fidelity Lodge No. 39 at Austin, Minnesota, in 1925.
- Roger Nelson (1759–7 June 1815), brigadier general during the American Revolutionary War and later a congressman from Maryland. Member of Hiram Lodge No. 28, Frederick, Maryland.
- Samuel Nelson, U.S. Supreme Court Associate Justice (1845–1872)
- Thomas Nelson, Jr., governor of Virginia, signer of the U.S. Declaration of Independence. Williamsburg Lodge No. 6, Williamsburg, Virginia.
- Aleksa Nenadović (1749–1804), Serbian statesman, prince of Tamnava—Posavina
- Mateja Nenadović, Serbian Orthodox priest and politician
- Wilbur Dick Nesbit (1871–1927), American poet and humorist. Raised in Evans Lodge No. 524, Evanston, Illinois, on 27 March 1915.
- James W. Nesmith (23 July 1820 – 17 June 1885), U.S. senator from Oregon. Member of Salem Lodge No. 4, Salem, Oregon.
- Jeremiah Neterer (24 January 1862 – 2 February 1943), U.S. federal judge. Grand Master of the Grand Lodge of Washington (state) in 1910 through 1911.
- Nicholas Netterville, 5th Viscount Netterville (1708–1750), Irish peer. Notable for having been tried and acquitted by his peers on a charge of murder. Grand Master of the Grand Lodge of Ireland in 1732.
- Keith Neville (25 February 1884 – 4 December 1959), 18th governor of Nebraska. Received degrees in Platte Valley Lodge No. 32, North Platte, Nebraska, on 8 September 24 November 1908 and 31 July 1909.
- Wendell Cushing Neville (12 May 1870 – 8 July 1930), major general of the U.S. Marine Corps, Medal of Honor recipient, and the 14th Commandant of the Marine Corps. Mason and National Sojourner in San Francisco.
- Harry Stewart New (31 December 1858 – 9 May 1937), U.S. senator from Indiana and 48th U.S. Postmaster General. Member of Ancient Landmarks Lodge No. 319, Indianapolis.
- Cyril Newall, marshal of the RAF and Governor-General of New Zealand. Grand Master of the Grand Lodge of New Zealand.
- Walter Cass Newberry (23 December 1835 – 20 July 1912), brevet brigadier general of the Union Army during the American Civil War and congressman from Illinois. Member of Sanger Lodge No. 129, Waterville, New York.
- Harry Kenneth Newburn (1 January 1906 – 25 August 1974), American educator who served as the president of various universities during the mid-20th century. Member of McKenzie River Lodge No. 195 of Eugene, Oregon.
- William Augustus Newell (5 September 1817 – 8 August 1901), 11th governor of the Washington Territory, 18th governor of and congressman from New Jersey. Raised in Hightstown Lodge No. 41, Hightstown, New Jersey, on 23 May 1856.
- J. Lincoln Newhall (26 March 1870 – 23 July 1952), congressman from Kentucky
- Robert Newman (20 March 1752 – 26 May 1804), sexton at the Old North Church in Boston, Massachusetts. Famously hung lanterns "one if by land, two if by sea" in the church's steeple as part of the warning signal system devised by Paul Revere during the Battles of Lexington and Concord. Member of St. Johns Lodge, Boston.
- Joseph Fort Newton (1880–1950), American Baptist minister, attorney and Freemason. Authored over 30 books, perhaps his most famous being The Builders: A Story and Study of Freemasonry, published in 1914, which is still widely read and distributed. He was raised in Friendship Lodge No. 7, Dixon, Illinois, on 28 May 1902 and later affiliated with Mt. Hermon Lodge No. 263, Cedar Rapids, Iowa.
- Thomas Willoughby Newton (18 January 1804 – 22 September 1853), congressman from Arkansas. Member of Alexandria Washington Lodge No. 22, Alexandria, Virginia.
- Michel Ney (10 January 1769 – 7 December 1815), French soldier and military commander during the French Revolutionary Wars and the Napoleonic Wars. Some say he was made a Mason in the Lodge of the Nine Sisters, Paris, about 1792. The International Masonic Congress' bulletin of 1917 says he was initiated in 1801, but does not give the lodge.
- Denis Sassou Nguesso, general and president of the Republic of the Congo
- Philip N. Nicholas (1773–18 August 1849), judge of the Virginia General Court from 1823 until his death. Member of Jerusalem Lodge No. 54, Richmond, Virginia.
- Samuel Nicholas (1744–27 August 1790), the first commissioned officer of the United States Continental Marines (predecessor to the United States Marine Corps). Member of Lodge No. 13, Philadelphia.
- Wilson Cary Nicholas (31 January 1761 – 10 October 1820), officer of the Virginia Militia during the American Revolutionary War, U.S. senator from and 19th governor of Virginia. First master of Warren Lodge No. 33, Warren, Virginia.
- Vernon Nicholls (1917–1996), English clergyman, Bishop of Sodor and Man. Multiple English lodges, and Provincial Grand Master (UGLE) for Warwickshire.
- John Conover Nichols (31 August 1896 – 7 November 1945), U.S. congressman from Oklahoma. Member of Eufaula Lodge No. 1, Eufaula, Oklahoma.
- Alfred Osborn Pope Nicholson (31 August 1808 – 23 March 1876), U.S. senator from Tennessee. Member of Columbia Lodge No. 31, Columbia, Tennessee.
- James Nicholson (1737–2 September 1804), officer in the Continental Navy during the American Revolutionary War. Made a Mason in Lodge No. 7, Kent County, Maryland, on 19 June 1778.
- Samuel Nicholson (1743–28 December 1811), officer in the Continental Navy during the American Revolutionary War and later in the U.S. Navy. First commander of the famous frigate Constitution, whose construction he superintended. Member of Lodge No. 17, Queenstown, Maryland.
- Samuel D. Nicholson (22 February 1859 – 24 March 1923), U.S. senator from Colorado. Member of Leadville Lodge No. 51, receiving degrees on 20 January, 17 February, and 2 March 1889, and was master of same in 1892.
- Daniel Nicols (1833–1897), founder of the Café Royal in London
- Henry F. Niedringhaus (15 December 1864 – 3 August 1941), congressman from Missouri. Member of Occidental Lodge No. 163, St. Louis.
- Hezekiah Niles (10 October 1777 – 2 April 1839), American newspaper publisher. Member of Warren Lodge No. 51, Maryland.
- David Nixon, English entertainment magician
- George S. Nixon (2 April 1860 – 5 June 1912), U.S. senator from Nevada. Member of Winnemucca Lodge No. 19, Winnemucca, Nevada.
- John Nixon (1 March 1727 – 24 March 1815), brigadier general in the Continental Army during the American Revolutionary War. His lodge is not known, but he is recorded as a visitor to American Union Lodge on 24 June 1779.
- Kwame Nkrumah, politician, political theorist and revolutionary, Prime Minister and President of Ghana
- James Noble (16 December 1785 – 26 February 1831), the first U.S. senator from Indiana. Member of Harmony Lodge No. 11, Brookville, Indiana.
- Noah Noble (15 January 1794 – 8 February 1844), fifth governor of Indiana. Master of Harmony Lodge No. 11, Brookville, Indiana, in 1822.
- Edmond Noel (4 March 1856 – 30 July 1927), 37th governor of Mississippi. Member of Lexington Lodge No. 24, Lexington, Mississippi.
- John Noorthouck (1732–1732), English author. Member of Lodge of Antiquity, London.
- Peter Norbeck (27 August 1870 – 20 December 1936), ninth governor of and U.S. senator from South Dakota. Received 32° AASR (SJ) at Yankton on 22 June 1919 and member of Yelduz Shrine Temple at Aberdeen, South Dakota. Blue lodge name and number not listed in Denslow.
- Albin Walter Norblad, Jr. (12 September 1908 – 20 September 1964), congressman from Oregon. Member of Harbor Lodge No. 183, Astoria.
- Frank Herbert Norcross (11 May 1869 – 4 November 1952), U.S. federal judge. Member of Reno Lodge No. 13, Reno, Nevada.
- Gunnar Hans Nordbye (4 February 1888 – 5 November 1977), U.S. federal judge. Member of Khurum Lodge No. 112, Minneapolis, Minnesota, receiving degrees on 27 February, 6 March, and 12 March 1914. Grand Master of the Grand Lodge of Minnesota in 1939.
- Thomas Howard, 8th Duke of Norfolk (11 December 1683 – 23 December 1732), British peer involved in the Jacobite rising of 1715. Grand Master, Grand Lodge of England (Moderns), 1729–30.
- John Northcott, Australian soldier; Grand Master of New South Wales (1952–1955)
- William F. Norrell (29 August 1896 – 15 February 1961), congressman from Arkansas. Member of Eureka Lodge No. 40, Monticello, Arkansas.
- George W. Norris (11 July 1861 – 2 September 1944), congressman and U.S. senator from Nebraska. Member of Beaver City Lodge No. 93, Beaver City, Nebraska.
- John Northcott (24 March 1890 – 4 August 1966), KCMG, KCVO, CB, KStJ Australian Army general who served as Chief of the General Staff during the Second World War and commanded the British Commonwealth Occupation Force in the occupation of Japan
- Amos Nourse (17 December 1794 – 7 April 1877), medical doctor and U.S. senator from Maine. Deputy grand master of the Grand Lodge of Maine in 1832.
- Kenneth Noye, British criminal; Hammersmith Lodge
- William Nuessle (5 May 1878 – 30 March 1959), justice of the North Dakota Supreme Court. Received degrees on 3 October 1904, 6 February and 6 March 1905 in Bismarck Lodge No. 5, Bismarck, North Dakota.
- Sam Nunn, U.S. senator from Georgia
- Gerald Nye (19 December 1892 – 17 July 1971), U.S. senator from North Dakota. Member of Northern Light Lodge No. 45, Cooperstown, North Dakota.
- James W. Nye (10 June 1815 – 25 December 1876), U.S. senator from Nevada. Member of Hamilton Lodge No. 120, Hamilton, New York.

== O ==
- José María Obando (1795–1861), Colombian president and general
- Dositej Obradović (1742–1811), Serbian author, philosopher, linguist, polyglot and the first minister of education of Serbia
- Mihailo Obrenović III, Prince of Serbia (1823 – 1868)
- William O'Brien, 4th Earl of Inchiquin (1700–18 July 1777), KB Irish peer and politician. Grand Master of the Grand Lodge of England (Moderns) in 1726.
- Juan O'Donojú (1762–1821), Spanish army officer and colonial governor
- Daniel O'Connell, Irish political figure, Initiated in Connor Lodge No. 189, Dublin, in 1799; affiliate member of Ancient Union Lodge No. 13, Limerick City and the Founder Senior Warden of Lodge No. 886, Tralee, County Kerry.
- Hans Christian Oersted (1777–1851), Danish physicist and chemist who discovered that electric currents create magnetic fields
- Bernardo O'Higgins, South American revolutionary leader and first Chilean head of state as Captain General
- Harris R. Oke (1891–1940), wounded veteran of World War I who became Colonial Secretary, The Gambia, British West Africa (1934–1940), and served as its Acting Governor and Commander-in-Chief for six extended periods between 1934 and 1940
- Ransom E. Olds, automotive pioneer and founder of Oldsmobile. Capitol Lodge No. 66, Lansing, Michigan.
- Shaquille O'Neal, NBA basketball player. Made a "Mason at sight" by the Most Worshipful Prince Hall Grand Lodge of Massachusetts F&AM, member of Widow's Son Lodge No. 28 in Boston.
- William Onslow, 4th Earl of Onslow, British politician
- Harry Oppenheimer, South African businessman
- Oscar I of Sweden, King of Sweden and Norway
- Oscar II, King of Sweden and Norway
- Camilo Osías, president of the Senate of the Philippines
- Carl von Ossietzky (1889–1938), German journalist, pacifist, and Nobel laureate
- Wilhelm Ostwald, German chemist Nobel laureate and philosopher
- William Dillon Otter, Canadian general. Initiated in Ionic Lodge, No. 25, Toronto, in February 1869
- Derwyn Owen, Archbishop of Toronto and Primate of the Anglican Church of Canada. Ionic Lodge No 25, Toronto.

== P ==
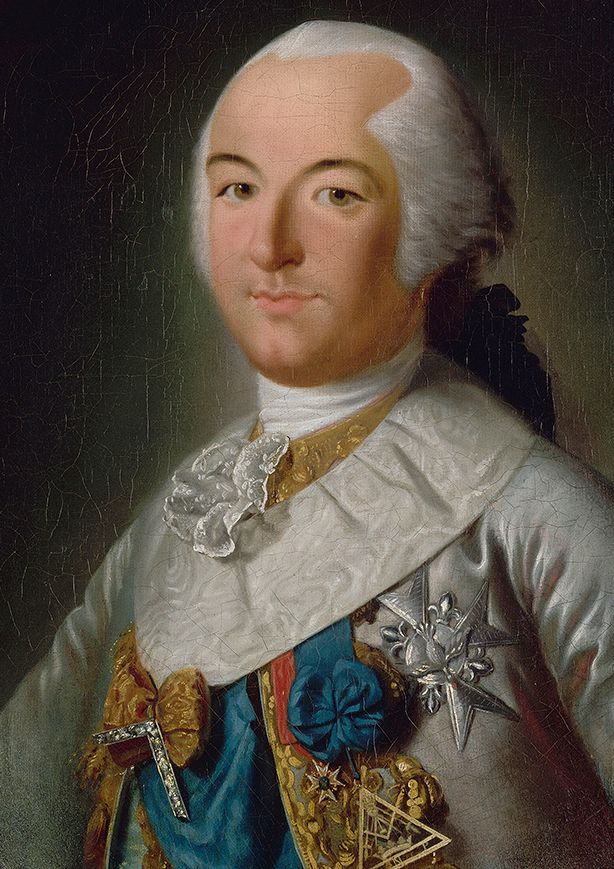
The Duke of Orléans in Masonic regalia by Michel Garnier

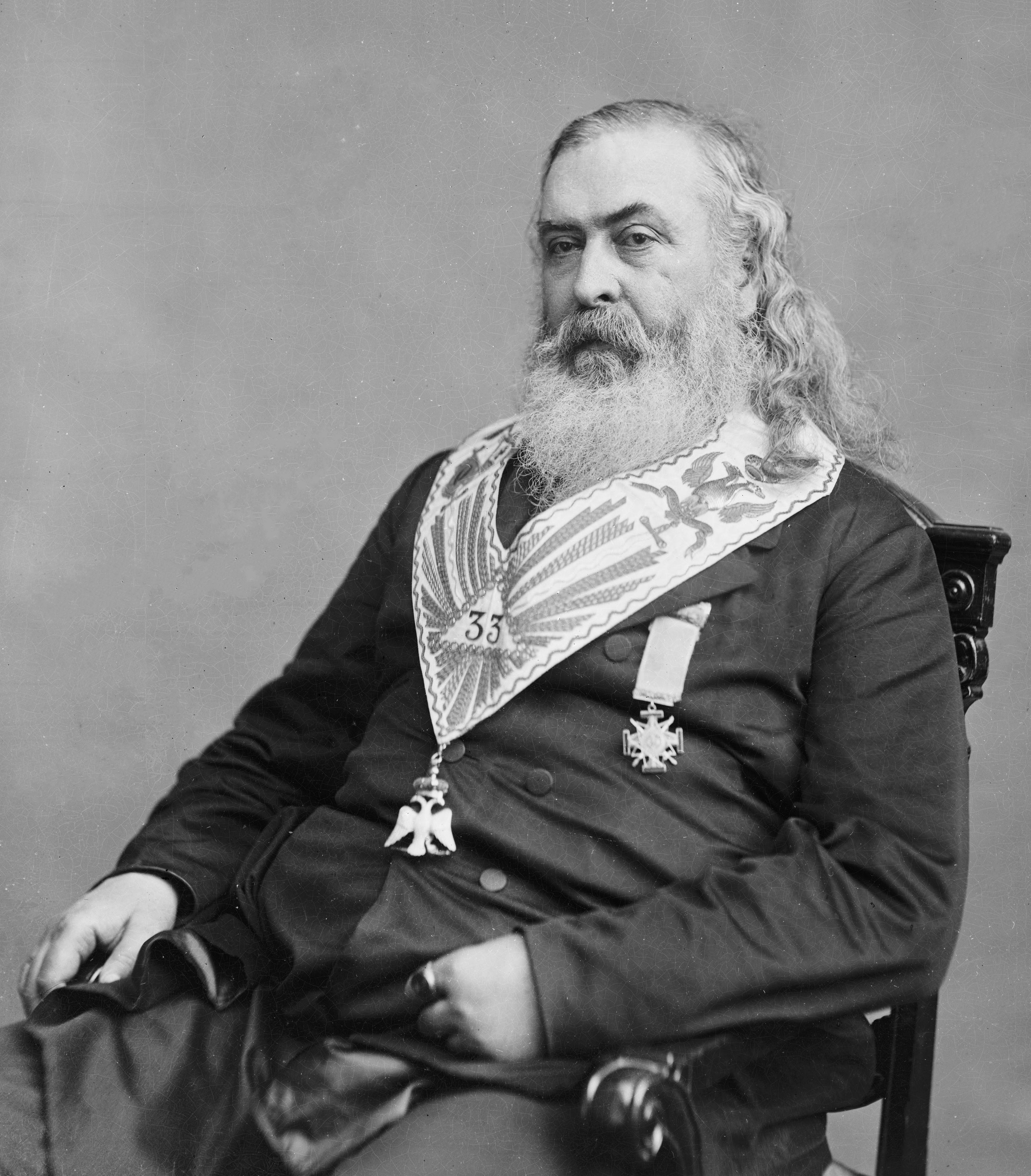
Albert Pike in Masonic regalia by Mathew Brady

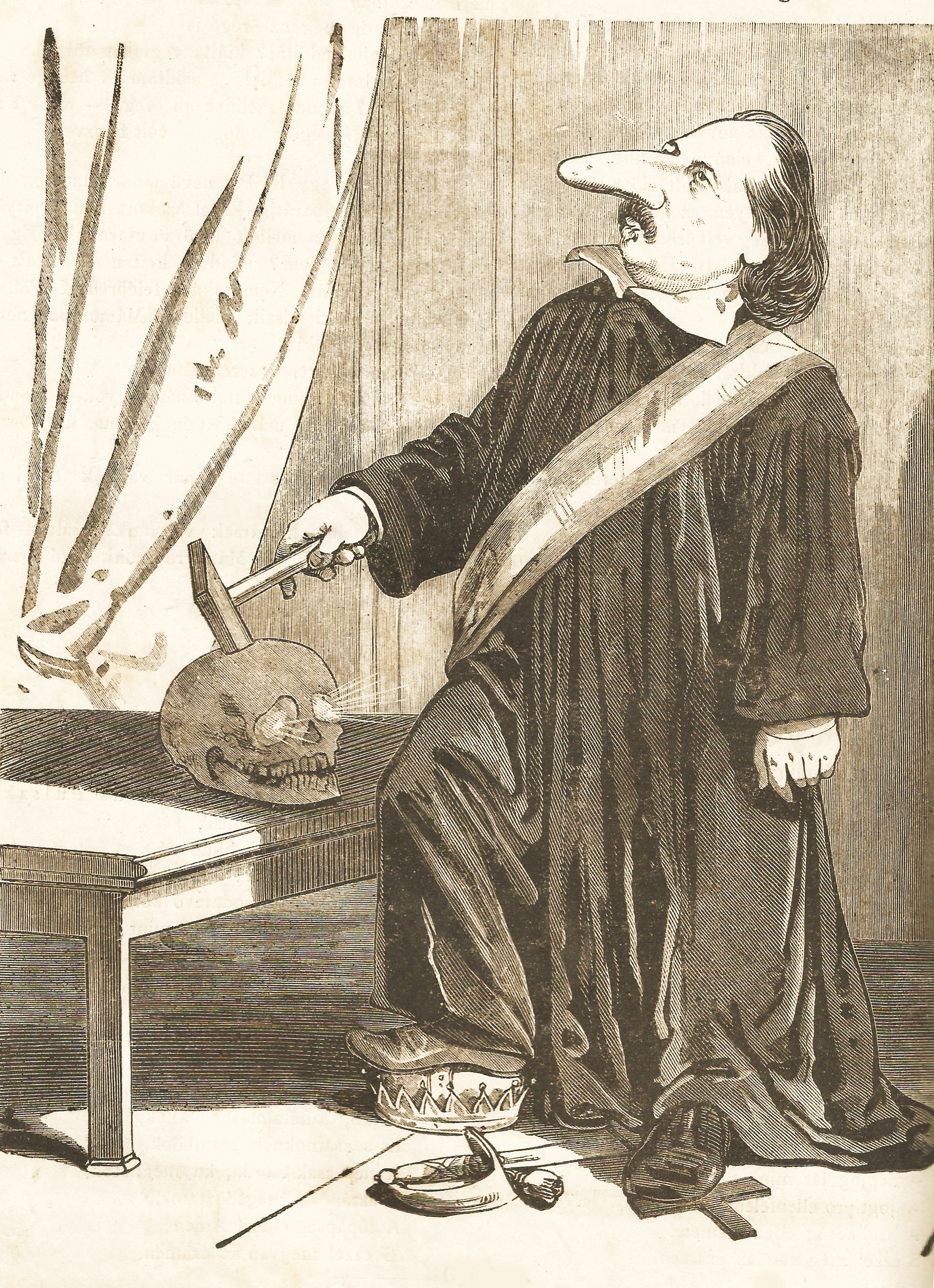
Ferenc Pulszky – János Jankó's caricature

- Francesco Mario Pagano, Italian jurist and philosopher. Worshipful Master of the Neapolitan lodge "La philantropia", English rite.
- Earle Page (1880–1961), 11th prime minister of Australia. Initiated into Lodge Prince Leopold No. 87 UGLNSW.
- John Page, 13th governor of Virginia. Botetourt Lodge No. 7, Gloucester, Virginia.
- Brad Paisley, American country music artist. Southern Jurisdiction, Scottish Rite.
- Alexandru Paleologu, Romanian essayist, literary critic, diplomat and politician
- Rafael Palma, Filipino politician, writer, and educator. Fourth president of the University of the Philippines. Bagong Buhay Lodge No. 291 (renumbered No. 16), 14 July 1908. Affiliated with Sinukuan Lodge No. 16 and in 1920 became Grand Master, the unified Grand Lodge of the Philippine Islands.
- Arnold Palmer, professional golfer. Loyalhanna Lodge No. 275, Latrobe, Pennsylvania.
- Joseph B. Palmer, lawyer, legislator and Confederate general in the American Civil War. Mt. Moriah Lodge No. 18, Tennessee.
- Quintin Paredes, Filipino lawyer, politician, and statesman. Raised 29 November 1913 at Sinukuan Lodge No. 16 and became its Worshipful Master in 1920. Grand Master 1922.
- Ely S. Parker, Seneca spokesman, military secretary to Ulysses S. Grant. Batavia Lodge No. 88, Batavia, New York, and later affiliated with Valley Lodge No. 109. Founder and first Worshipful Master of Akron Lodge No. 527 of New York. Ely Parker Lodge No. 1002 of Buffalo, New York, is named after him.
- Fess Parker, actor. Mount Olive Lodge No. 506, California.
- Richard Parsons, 1st Earl of Rosse, first recorded Grand Master of Ireland and founder of the Dublin Hellfire club
- Isma'il Pasha of Egypt, Khedive (viceroy) of Egypt and Sudan
- Nawab Mansoor Ali Khan Pataudi, the former Nawab of Pataudi in India and former captain of the Indian national cricket team
- William Paterson (1745–1806), associate justice of the Supreme Court of the United States
- Sir (Thomas) Angus Lyall Paton, civil engineer of the Aswan High Dam
- Derek Pattinson, British civil servant, and Secretary-General of the General Synod (Church of England). Kaisar-i-Hind Lodge No 1724 (London) et al.
- Alexander Peacock (1861–1933), 20th premier of Victoria. Grand Master of the United Grand Lodge of Victoria.
- Charles Willson Peale, American artist and portrait painter
- Norman Vincent Peale, Midwood Lodge No. 1062, Brooklyn, New York
- Pedro I of Brazil, emperor of Brazil
- Borislav Pekić, Serbian writer
- Carlos Pellegrini, 6th President of Argentina
- Edmund Pendleton, delegate to the Continental Congress, member of Virginia House of Burgesses, Virginia Supreme Court justice, and statesman. Member of Fairfax Lodge No. 43, Culpeper, Virginia.
- William Sydney Penley, commonly known as W. S. Penley, English actor, singer, and comedian. Savage Club Lodge No 2190, London (UGLE).
- John Penn, proprietary governor of Pennsylvania. Member of first lodge of Philadelphia.
- James Cash Penney, founder of J. C. Penney department stores. Wasatch Lodge No. 1 in Salt Lake City, Utah.
- William Henry Pennington (1833–1923), soldier and actor
- Sydney Perks (1864–1944), architect and surveyor to the City of London. Guildhall Lodge No. 3116, London. Initiated 20 February 1906.
- Thomas Perrett (1843–1923), sergeant, Confederate States Army, 1861–1865. North Carolina State Senator, 1907–1908. Belmont Lodge No. 108, Faison, North Carolina.
- Matthew Calbraith Perry, commodore, U.S. Navy. Holland Lodge No. 8, New York, 1819.
- John J. Pershing, commander, American Expeditionary Forces, World War I. Lincoln Lodge No. 19, Lincoln, Nebraska.
- Petar II Petrović-Njegoš, Prince-Bishop of Montenegro
- Peter I of Serbia
- Prince Philip, Duke of Edinburgh, husband of Queen Elizabeth II. Navy Lodge No 2612, London.
- Louis Philippe II, Duke of Orléans, Grand Master of the Grand Orient de France during the French Revolution
- John Henry Lawrence Phillips, Bishop of Portsmouth, 1960–1975. Provincial Grand Master, Hampshire & Isle of Wight, 1975–1979.
- George Pickett, Confederate States Army general
- Albert Pike (1809–1891), associate justice of the Arkansas Supreme Court. Re-wrote rituals for Scottish Rite (Southern Jurisdiction), author of Morals and Dogma, Western Star Lodge No. 2, Little Rock, Arkansas. Sovereign Grand Commander AASR, Southern Jurisdiction.
- Marcelo H. del Pilar, Filipino writer, reformer, journalist, and leader of the Philippine Revolution. Considered the "Father of Philippine Masonry". Initiated in Spain in 1889.
- Powis Pinder (1872–1941), British actor and singer. Chine Lodge No. 1884.
- John Pintard, founder of the New-York Historical Society. Holland Lodge No. 8, New York.
- Scottie Pippen, retired Chicago Bulls small forward #33 (1987–2004)
- Homer Plessy, plaintiff in the United States Supreme Court decision Plessy v. Ferguson, Secretary of Supreme Council of Louisiana
- Augustus Le Plongeon, French archaeologist, first to survey and excavate at Chichen Itza
- David Plunket, 1st Baron Rathmore, British Conservative politician
- William Plunket, Governor-General of New Zealand; Grand Master
- Michael Pocalyko, American business executive and novelist. Alexandria-Washington Lodge No. 22, Alexandria, Virginia.
- Joel Roberts Poinsett, U.S. statesman, diplomat, physician and botanist
- James K. Polk, U.S. president. Initiated 5 June 1820, Columbia Lodge No. 31, Tennessee.
- William Polk, officer of the North Carolina Line during the American Revolutionary War and fifth Grand Master of North Carolina. Charter Master, Phalanx Lodge No. 31, Charlotte.
- Mariano Ponce, Filipino physician. Initiated in Madrid and became Secretary of Logia Revoluccion and Logia Solidaridad 53. He also became a 33° A&AR mason under the auspices of the Gran Oriente Español.
- Alexander Pope (1668–1744), British satirical poet
- Arthur Porritt, Governor-General of New Zealand; Grand Master
- Dana Porter, Canadian politician
- Art Potter, Canadian ice hockey administrator; member of West Edmonton Lodge Number 101
- Eugène Edine Pottier, French composer of the Internationale
- John Poulson, architectural designer and businessman
- D'Arcy Power, surgeon and Air Vice-Marshal of the Royal Air Force. Lodge of Assistance No 2773 (London), of which he was Worshipful Master, 1949–50.
- William Preston, author of Illustrations of Masonry
- Aleksandar Protogerov, Bulgarian Army general, politician and revolutionary, Grand Master in the lodge of Bulgaria.
- Pierre-Joseph Proudhon, French socialist and revolutionary
- Richard Pryor, actor, comedian; Henry Brown Lodge No. 22, Peoria, Illinois
- Ferenc Pulszky (1814–1897), Hungarian politician, writer and scientist, Grand Master.
- Reynato Puno, Chief Justice of the Philippines. Grand Master of Masons, active member of Hiram Lodge No. 88 and the Grand Lodge of the Philippines.
- Mihajlo Idvorski Pupin (1858–1935), a.k.a. Michael I. Pupin, Serbian and American physicist and physical chemist
- Alexander Pushkin (1799–1837), Russian poet. Lodge Ovid, Kishinev, 1821.
- Rufus Putnam, surveyor, general in the American Revolutionary War. Elected first Grand Master of Masons in Ohio.
- Carlo Pisacane, Italian revolutionary that led an expedition against the bourbons

== Q ==
- William Andrew Quarles (1825–1893), lawyer, politician, railroad executive, and a general from Tennessee in the Confederate States Army during the American Civil War. Member of Clarksville Lodge No. 89, Clarksville, Tennessee.
- William Howard Quasha (1912–1996), engineer, lawyer, U.S. Army soldier, Boy Scouting official in the Philippines. Grand Master, Grand Lodge, F&AM, Philippines. Chairman, President, CEO, St. Luke's, which named its medical school the St. Luke's College of Medicine William H. Quasha Memorial. Worked with Rensis Likert on the Revised Minnesota Paper Form Board Test. Known for his 1964 trip to the Vatican to foster amity between Masonry and the Catholic Church.
- Matthew Quay (1833–1904), U.S. Senator from Pennsylvania. Member of St. James Lodge No. 457, Beaver, Pennsylvania.
- Rivaltz Quenette (1928–2015), Mauritian senior civil servant, Clerk of the National Assembly, and writer.
- Manuel L. Quezon, first president of the Commonwealth of the Philippines under U.S. occupation rule in the early period of the 20th century. Raised 17 March 1908 at Sinukuan Lodge No. 272 (renamed Sinukuan Lodge No. 16). First Filipino Grand Master of the Grand Lodge of the Philippine Islands that was established in 1917.
- Henry B. Quinby (1846–1924), 52nd governor of New Hampshire. Member of Mount Lebanon Lodge No. 32, Laconia, New Hampshire.
- Josiah Quincy III (1772–1864), congressman from Massachusetts, mayor of Boston, and 16th president of Harvard University. Raised in St. John's Lodge of Boston, 28 March 1795.
- Edgar Quinet (1803–1875), French historian and intellectual. A Freemason, but his lodge is not known.
- John A. Quitman (1798–1858), 10th and 16th governor of Mississippi. Raised in Hiram Lodge No. 18, Delaware, Ohio, in 1820, and affiliated with Harmony Lodge No. 1, Natchez, Mississippi, in 1822, serving as master two years later. Was grand master of the Grand Lodge of Mississippi from 1826 to 1837 and 1845–46. He was a 32° Scottish Rite (Southern Jurisdiction) and intimate friend of Albert Pike, who conducted a lodge of sorrow in his memory in 1860. Was an honorary member of the grand lodges of South Carolina and New York.

== R ==
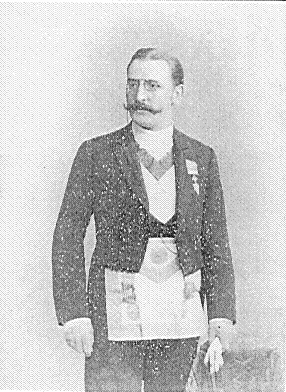
Theodor Reuss in Masonic regalia

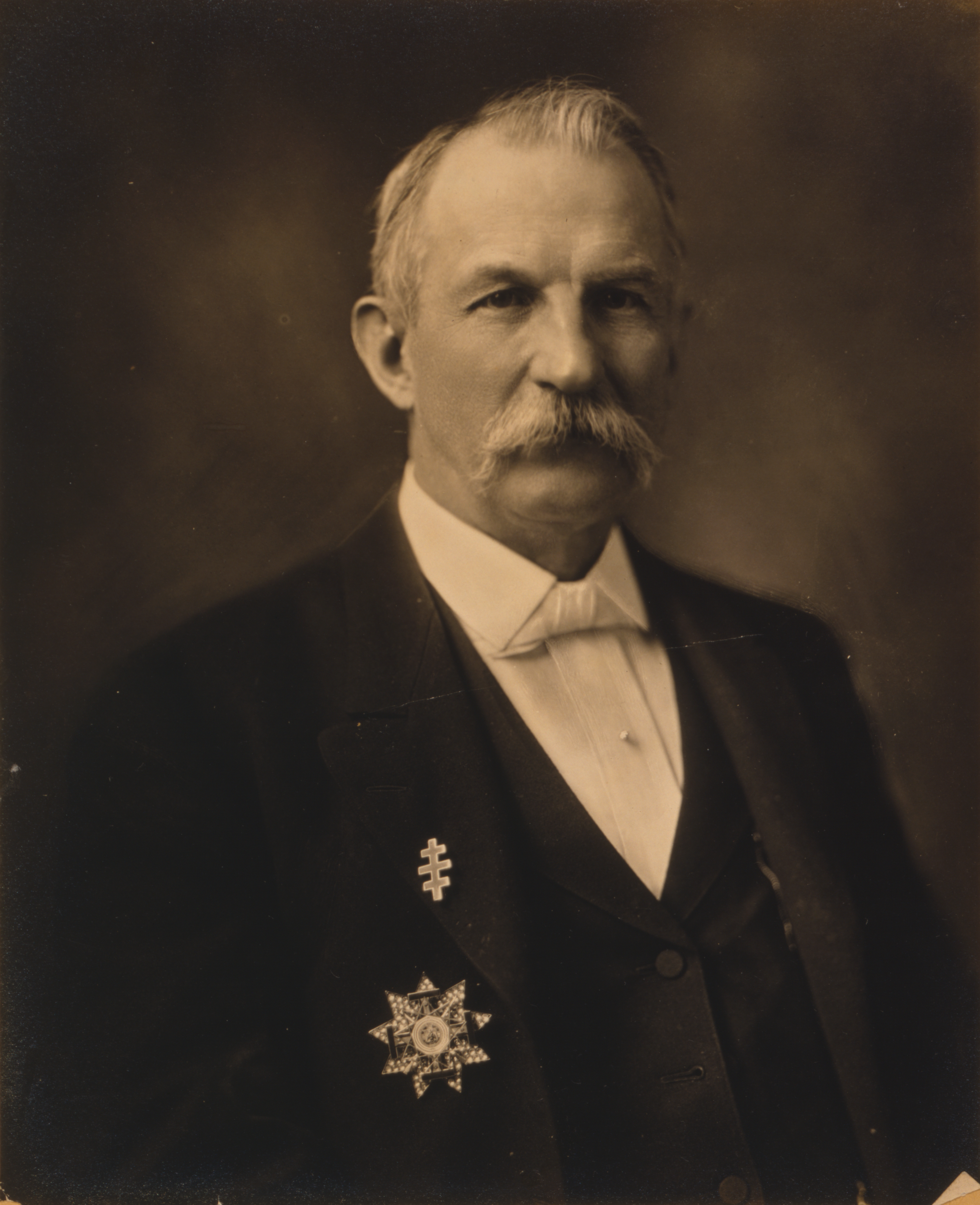
James Richardson in Masonic regalia

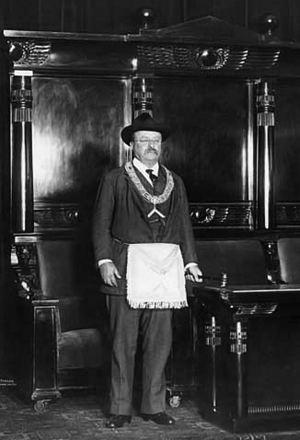
Theodore Roosevelt in Masonic regalia

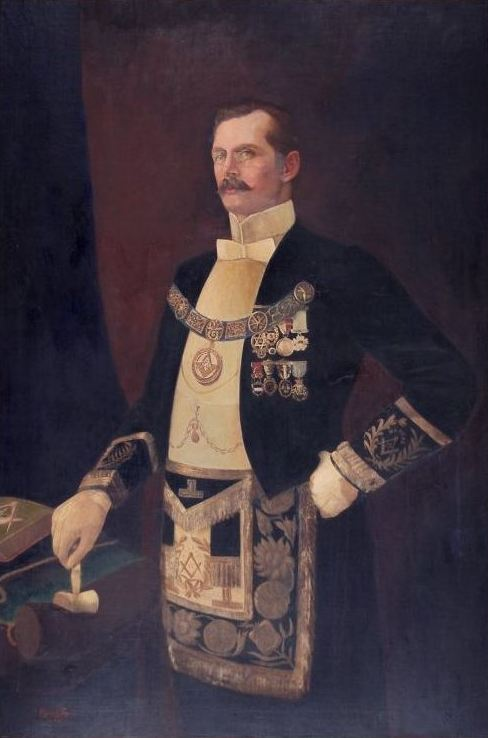
The Lord Ampthill in Masonic regalia by Raja Ravi Varma

- Harley Race, American professional wrestler and an 8 time National Wrestling Alliance World Heavyweight Champion. Member of Hickory Hill Lodge No. 211 in Eldon, Missouri. He was also a Shriner.
- Ion Heliade Rădulescu, Romanian academic, poet, essayist, memoirist, short story writer, newspaper editor and politician
- Thomas Stamford Raffles, statesman, founded Singapore. Raised 5 July 1813, Lodge De Vriendschap, Surabaya. Ragan
- Nick Rahall (1949– ), congressman from West Virginia
- Seewoosagur Ramgoolam (1900–1985), Mauritian physician, chief minister, first prime minister, and fifth governor-general.
- Georgi Sava Rakovski, Bulgarian revolutionary, writer and an important figure of the Bulgarian National Revival and resistance against Ottoman rule.
- Andrew Michael Ramsay (1686–1743), commonly known as "Chevalier Ramsay". Jacobite peer, author of Discourse pronounced at the reception of Freemasons, which first proposed the idea that Freemasonry descends from crusading knights.
- George Ramsay, 9th Earl of Dalhousie, British general and colonial administrator, Governor General of British North America (1820–1828), Grand Master of Scotland (1804–1806)
- Alf Ramsey, manager of England World Cup-winning football team, 1966. Initiated into Waltham Abbey Lodge No. 2750, 5 October 1953.
- A. Philip Randolph, Joppa Lodge No. 55, New York City
- Edmund Randolph (1753–1813), American attorney, seventh governor of Virginia, the second U.S. Secretary of State, and the first U.S. Attorney General. Williamsburg Lodge No. 456; Grand Master of the Grand Lodge of Virginia, 1787–89.
- Johan Wilhelm Rangell, Prime Minister of Finland (1941–1943)
- Alois Rašín, Czech politician, economist, one of the founders of Czechoslovakia.
- Frank C. Rathje, Chicago banker, businessman, and philanthropist. Member of Englewood Lodge 690.
- Francis Rawdon-Hastings, 1st Marquess of Hastings, British politician and colonial administrator, Governor-General of the Presidency of Fort William (1813–1823). Acting Grand Master of Scotland (1806–08).
- Harry Rawson, British admiral, leader of the Benin Expedition of 1897. Grand Master of New South Wales (1905–09)
- Sam Rayburn, U.S. politician, U.S. Speaker of the House. Took his first degree 7 August 1922, remained Entered Apprentice upon his death, Constantine Lodge No. 13.
- Langford Reed, British scriptwriter and author; Authors' Lodge No. 3456
- Stanley F. Reed, U.S. Supreme Court Associate Justice (1938–1957)
- George R. Reeves, Speaker of the Texas House, Confederate colonel. George R. Reeves Masonic Lodge – Pottsboro, Texas.
- George Reid, fourth prime minister of Australia. Lodge Centennial No. 169, UGL of New South Wales.
- Ed Rendell, mayor of Philadelphia, governor of Pennsylvania
- Theodor Reuss, German occultist and head of O.T.O., Pilger Loge #238 (UGLE) 1878, and excluded from Freemasonry in 1880
- Paul Revere, American Revolutionary hero. St. Andrew's Lodge, Boston, Massachusetts; Grand Master of Massachusetts 1794–97.
- Don Revie, England football team manager 1974–1977; initiated 1965 in Leodiensis Lodge, No 4029
- Isabelo de los Reyes, Filipino politician and labor activist
- Donn Reynolds, Canadian country music singer and world champion yodeler. Initiated April 1990, Flower City Lodge No. 689, Brampton, Ontario, Canada.
- Cecil Rhodes, prime minister of the Cape Colony
- Michael Richards, American actor
- James Richardson (1843–1914), American politician
- Louis-Augustin Richer (1740–1819), classical singer, singing master and composer; member of the Grand Orient de France
- Eddie Rickenbacker, World War I American flying ace. Received degrees from Kilwinning Lodge No. 297, Detroit, Michigan, in 1922.
- Branch Rickey, Major League Baseball (MLB) executive elected to the Baseball Hall of Fame in 1967, best known for breaking Major League Baseball's color barrier by signing African American player Jackie Robinson
- Don Rickles (1926–2017), American actor and comedian. Raised 6 June 1953, Service City Geba Lodge No. 1009, Astoria, New York.
- Charles Ridgeway (1841–1927), Bishop of Chichester
- Arnold Ridley, English actor and playwright. Savage Club Lodge No 2190, London.
- Matthew White Ridley, 2nd Viscount Ridley (1874–1916), British peer and politician. Initiated in the Apollo University Lodge, Oxford.
- Rafael del Riego, Spanish general and liberal politician
- Charles Riley, Anglican archbishop. Grand Master of the Grand Lodge of Western Australia 1904–17, 1920–29.
- William G. Ritch, acting governor of the New Mexico Territory, member of the Wisconsin State Senate
- Ringling Brothers (all seven of them), American circus promoters
- José Rizal, polymath and national hero of the Philippines. Logia Solidaridad 53, Madrid, Spain; made honorary Worshipful Master of Nilad Lodge No. 144 in 1892.
- Ross Rizley (1892–1969), American judge
- Norwell Roberts (b. 1946), first black British police constable of modern times. Beauchamp Lodge No 1422 (Kent) and Radlett Lodge No 6652 (Hertfordshire).
- Bradbury Robinson, pioneering American football player, physician, conservationist, and local politician
- Charles Napier Robinson, Royal Navy officer and writer on naval matters
- John J. Robinson, (c. 1918 – 1996), U.S. Marine, author, and historian with a special interest in medieval Britain and the Crusades. He was the founding visionary of the Masonic Information Center.
- Sugar Ray Robinson, champion boxer
- Jimmie Rodgers, country singer; Spinks Lodge No. 507, Mississippi
- Roy Rogers, American actor; Hollywood Lodge No. 355, California
- Will Rogers, American political commentator and satirist; Claremore Lodge No. 53, Oklahoma
- Elliott Roosevelt, U.S. Air Force officer and author, son of Franklin Delano Roosevelt. Raised 17 February 1933, Architect's Lodge No. 519, New York.
- Franklin D. Roosevelt, U.S. president. Holland Lodge No. 8, New York.
- Franklin Delano Roosevelt Jr., U.S. congressman, son of Franklin Delano Roosevelt. Initiated 7 November 1935, Architect's Lodge No. 519, New York.
- James Roosevelt, politician and congressman, son of Franklin Delano Roosevelt. Initiated 7 November 1935, Architect's Lodge No. 519, New York.
- Theodore Roosevelt, U.S. president. Matinecock Lodge No. 806, Oyster Bay, New York. Honorary member of the Lodge of King Solomon's Temple No. 3464
- Félicien Rops, Belgian artist
- Edmundo Ros, musician. Sprig of Acacia Lodge, Javea, Spain.
- Constantin Daniel Rosenthal, Romanian painter and 1848 revolutionary
- C. A. Rosetti, Romanian literary and political leader, participant in the Wallachian Revolution of 1848
- A. J. Rosier (1880–1930), American politician, member of the Wyoming Senate
- James Mayer de Rothschild, financier. Initiated 24 October 1802, Emulation Lodge No. 12, London.
- Nathan Mayer Rothschild, financier. Initiated 24 October 1802, Emulation Lodge No. 12, London.
- George Rous, 3rd Earl of Stradbroke (1862–1947), 15th governor of Victoria. Grand Master of the United Grand Lodge of Victoria.
- Jean-Jacques Rousseau, 18th century Swiss-French philosopher, writer, and composer
- Archibald Hamilton Rowan, member of the Society of United Irishmen
- Manuel Roxas, first president of the independent Republic of the Philippines
- William Byron Rumford, California legislator. Most Worshipful Prince Hall Grand Lodge, Berkeley, California.
- Dutch Ruppersberger, U.S. representative for Maryland's 2nd congressional district.
- Jack Russell, English clergyman and dog breeder
- Oliver Russell, 2nd Baron Ampthill
- Alecu Russo, Romanian writer, literary critic and publicist
- John Rutledge, Chief Justice of the U.S. Supreme Court (1795), Associate Justice (1789–91)
- George Ryerson, Canadian politician
- Risto Ryti, fifth president of Finland (1940–44)

== S ==
- Leopold von Sacher-Masoch (1836–1895), Austrian author
- Mihail Sadoveanu, Romanian novelist, short story writer, journalist and political figure. Grand Master from 1932.
- Práxedes Mateo Sagasta (1825–1903), Prime Minister of Spain
- John Salt (1941–2017), Anglican Bishop of St Helena, initiated in 1993 in Eshowe Lodge No 2596 (UGLE), and a member of St Helena Lodge No 488 (UGLE).
- Leverett Saltonstall (1892–1979), Governor of Massachusetts (1939–1945), U.S. senator from Massachusetts (1945–1967). Member, Fraternity Lodge, Newton, Massachusetts.
- Haym Salomon (1740–1785), Financier of the American Revolution.
- José de San Martín, Argentine hero from the Spanish Revolution
- Harland Sanders (1890–1980), American businessman and founder of Kentucky Fried Chicken
- Sir Daniel Keyte Sandford (1798–1838), Scottish politician and classicist. Apollo University Lodge, Oxford.
- Augusto César Sandino, Central American revolutionary and founder of the Nicaraguan Sandinistas
- Merton Sandler (1926–2014), British academic, author, and psychopharmacologist. Initiated 19 May 1954 in the In Arduis Fidelis Lodge No 3432 (UGLE), and member of multiple other lodges.
- Dale V. Sandstrom, justice of the Supreme Court of North Dakota. Lewis & Clark Lodge No. 132, Bismarck.
- Antonio López de Santa Anna, Mexican general and president. He had been expelled from Masonry.
- Francisco de Paula Santander, Colombian general and politician, president of Colombia
- Artur Santos, Portuguese politician, mayor of Ourem during the Fatima apparitions
- Lope K. Santos, Tagalog writer from the Philippines. First Worshipful Master of Magat Lodge No. 68 in Bayombong, Nueva Vizcaya.
- Eduardo Santos, president of Colombia and newspaperman
- Sima Milutinović Sarajlija, Bosnian-Serbian scholar
- Frank Sargent, Canadian sports executive in ice hockey and curling. Freemason in the Scottish Rite Thunder Bay Lodge A.F. and A.M.
- Domingo Faustino Sarmiento, seventh president of Argentina and father of education. Served as Grand Master of the Most Worshipful Grand Lodge of Argentina.
- Hjalmar Schacht, German politician and economist, Minister of Economics under Hitler
- Michael Schiavello, Australian sports commentator
- Emanuel Schikaneder, German impresario, dramatist, actor, singer and composer. He is remembered today as Mozart's librettist for The Magic Flute, an opera with Masonic themes.
- Friedrich Schiller, German poet, philosopher, historian, and playwright. Rudolstadt Lodge, Berlin.
- Chuck Schumer, U.S. Senator from New York. Amos-Ft. Greene Lodge No. 922 (first degree only).
- Mayme Schweble, American prospector and politician
- Francis Scott (See 2nd Duke of Buccleuch)
- Robert Falcon Scott, naval officer and Antarctic explorer
- Walter Scott, Scottish novelist, playwright and poet. Initiated, passed and raised at an emergency meeting of St. David Lodge No 36, Edinburgh, 2 March 1801.
- Richard Seddon, longest serving prime minister of New Zealand (1893–1906). Grand Master of New Zealand (1898–1900).
- Charles Gabriel Seligman, British physician and ethnologist
- Peter Sellers, actor, comedian, star of The Goon Show and The Pink Panther movie series. Chelsea Lodge No 3098, UGLE.
- David B. Sentelle (1943– ), U.S. federal judge. Member of Excelsior Lodge 261 in Charlotte, North Carolina, as well as the Charlotte Valley of the Scottish Rite (thirty-third degree) and the Oasis Shrine of Charlotte. He is a winner of the Joseph Montfort Medal from the Grand Lodge of North Carolina for Outstanding Service to Freemasonry.
- Robert Service, poet
- R. B. Seymour Sewell, British naturalist
- Abel Seyler, theatre director
- Sir Ernest Shackleton, UK explorer
- Jimmy Shand, Scottish accordionist. Lodge Robert De Bruce No. 304, Ladybank, Fife.
- Lemuel C. Shepherd, Jr. (1896–1990), Navy Cross recipient, General, U.S. Marine Corps, 20th Commandant of the Marine Corps.
- Richard Brinsley Sheridan, British playwright and poet
- Robert Jason Sherman, American songwriter and playwright. Worshipful Master, Lodge of Faith and Friendship No. 7326.
- Alfred Short, British politician and trade unionist
- Heath Shuler, U.S. congressman for North Carolina. Oconee Lodge 427.
- Jean Sibelius, composer. Suomi Lodge No. 1, Helsinki, Finland, 1922. Wrote several pieces of interest to Masons including "Praising Hymn" and the "Ode to Fraternity."
- Merwin W. Silverthorn (1896–1985), Navy Cross recipient and LtGen, U.S. Marine Corps.
- Sampson Simson, lawyer and philanthropist
- David Simpson (1860–1931), builder, contractor former mayor of Harrogate, and property developer.
- William Sinclair (1850–1917), Anglican priest and Archdeacon of London. Grand Chaplain of UGLE.
- Maharaja Duleep Singh, (1838–1893) last Maharaja of the Sikh Empire, joined the Freemasons and was admitted into a lodge in 1861.
- Fred Sinowatz, Chancellor of Austria
- Charles Sitch, British politician and trade unionist
- Carl L. Sitter, colonel of the U.S. Marine Corps and Medal of Honor recipient. Oasis of Mara Masonic Lodge #735, Twentynine Palms, California.
- Richard Bernard "Red" Skelton, American comedian. Vincennes Lodge No. 1, Vincennes, Indiana.
- Gustave Slapoffski (1862–1951), Australian conductor. Emulation Lodge No. 1505.
- James Sloan, co-founder of the Orange Order
- John D. Sloat (1781–1867), American rear admiral, claimed California for the United States in 1846. St. Nicholas lodge No. 321 in New York City (1800).
- Chas Smash, birth name Cathal Smyth, known as Carl Smyth; English singer, songwriter, and musician, and member of Madness. Yarborough Centenary Lodge (UGLE).
- Augustus Smith (1804–1872), British Member of Parliament (1857–1865). Provincial Grand Master for the province of Cornwall (UGLE) (1863–1872).
- Gerard Smith (1839–1920), knight, businessman, politician, and governor of Western Australia. Studholme Lodge No. 1591, London; Grand Master of Western Australia.
- Hyrum Smith, Mormon leader. Mount Moriah Lodge No. 112, Palmyra, New York.
- Joseph Smith, founder of the Latter Day Saint movement. Nauvoo Lodge, Illinois.
- Joseph Smith Sr., Mormon leader. Ontario Lodge No. 23 of Canandaigua, New York, 1818.
- Maurice Smith, journalist and sports editor of the Winnipeg Free Press, member of lodges in Winnipeg, Manitoba, and Perth, Scotland.
- Walter Smith, professional footballer and club manager
- Cathal Smyth – see Chas Smash (above)
- John Soane, English architect
- Angelo Soliman, slave brought to Europe who became the first black African-born Freemason. True Harmony Lodge in 1783.
- Arthur Somers-Cocks, 6th Baron Somers (1887–1944), 16th governor of Victoria. Chief Scout of the British Empire, Grand Master of the United Grand Lodge of Victoria.
- John Philip Sousa, composer. Hiram Lodge No. 10, Washington, D.C.
- Henry Southwell (1860–1937), British Anglican clergyman, and both Archdeacon of Lewes and (simultaneously) Bishop of Lewes. Apollo University Lodge, Oxford, initiated 1880.
- Richard Dobbs Spaight Jr. (1796–1850), 27th governor of North Carolina
- George Spencer-Churchill, 8th Duke of Marlborough, initiated 9 January 1871, with brother Randolph
- Bernard Spilsbury, British forensic scientist
- Louis Spohr (1784–1859), German composer
- Axel Springer (1912–1985), German publisher, Founder of Axel Springer SE
- Percy Sproule (1873–1954), puisne judge
- Stevan Sremac (1855–1906), Serbian realist and comedy writer
- James St Clair-Erskine, 2nd Earl of Rosslyn, British politician, Member of Parliament (1782–1805), Lord Privy Seal, and Lord President of the council. Acting Grand Master of Scotland (1810–1812).
- Robert St Clair-Erskine, 4th Earl of Rosslyn, Scottish politician and Captain of the Gentlemen-at-Arms (1886–1890). Grand Master of Scotland (1870–1873).
- Ed Stafford, explorer, walked the length of the Amazon River
- Thomas Patten Stafford, Gemini and Apollo astronaut. Western Star Lodge No. 138, Oklahoma.
- Frederick Stanley, 16th Earl of Derby, British politician
- Ele Stansbury, Indiana Attorney General (1917–1921)
- Cyril Stapleton, English jazz musician
- Goswin de Stassart, Belgian statesman
- Milan Rastislav Štefánik (1880–1919), Slovak politician, astronomer, aviator, army general and co-founder of Czechoslovakia
- Heinrich Friedrich Karl vom und zum Stein (1757–1831), Prussian statesman and reformer
- Jock Stein, football manager of teams including Celtic F.C. and Scotland
- John Steinbeck, American author. Initiated, passed and raised in Salinas Lodge No. 204, California, 1929 (withdrew 1933).
- Stanisław Stempowski, Grand Master of the National Grand Lodge of Poland (1926–1928)
- Charles Mortram Sternberg, Canadian paleontologist. Civil Service Lodge No. 148, Ottawa.
- Stephen Stevens (1793–1870), Justice of the Indiana Supreme Court and abolitionist, helped to found a Temple in Brookville, Indiana, later abandoned Freemasonry.
- Thomas Stevens (1841–1920), British Anglican bishop, first Bishop of Barking. Initiated in the Isaac Newton University Lodge, Cambridge, and Grand Chaplain of the UGLE.
- Potter Stewart, U.S. Supreme Court Associate Justice (1958–81)
- Andrew Taylor Still, MD DO (1828–1917), founder of osteopathic medicine. Palmyra Lodge No. 23, Baldwin City, Kansas.
- Konstantin Stoilov, Bulgarian politician and twice Prime Minister.
- Louis Stokes (1925–), American politician, served in the U.S. House of Representatives
- W. Clement Stone, businessman, philanthropist and self-help book author (1902–2002)
- William Leete Stone, Sr., journalist and historian. Author of works regarding Freemasonry and its opponents.
- Joseph Story, U.S. Supreme Court Associate Justice (1811–45)
- Philipp von Stosch, occultist, antiquarian and English spy
- Prince Arthur, Duke of Connaught and Strathearn (1850–1942), member of the British royal family; served as the Governor General of Canada Honorary member of the Lodge of king Solomon's Temple No. 3464
- Gustav Stresemann, chancellor (1923) and foreign minister (1923–1929) of the Weimar Republic. Initiated in the lodge Frederick the Great on 22 July 1923.
- John McDouall Stuart, Scottish explorer of Australia
- William Stukeley, English archaeologist and antiquarian. Lodge at Salutation Tavern, London.
- Alexandru Sturdza, Russian publicist and diplomat of Romanian origin
- Dimitrie Sturdza, four-time Prime Minister of Romania, president of the Romanian Academy (1882–1884)
- Arthur Sullivan, composer, of Gilbert and Sullivan. Grand Organist of the UGLE in 1887.
- Charles Pelot Summerall (1867–1955), U.S. Army general, Chief of Staff of the United States Army and president of The Citadel. Made a Mason at Sight, later affiliated with Pythagorean Lodge No. 21, Charleston, South Carolina.
- William A. Sutherland, California State Assemblyman (1910–14)
- Gordon Swann – geologist who trained Apollo 14 and Apollo 15 astronauts – the asteroid 4082 Swann is named after him
- Noah H. Swayne, U.S. Supreme Court Associate Justice (1862–81)
- John Swett, founder of the California public school system. Phoenix Lodge No. 144, San Francisco.
- Martin Štěpánek, Czech actor, journalist and politician.
- Sun Yat-sen, Chinese revolutionary and statesman
- Carl "Alfalfa" Switzer (1927–1959 ), American actor.

== T ==
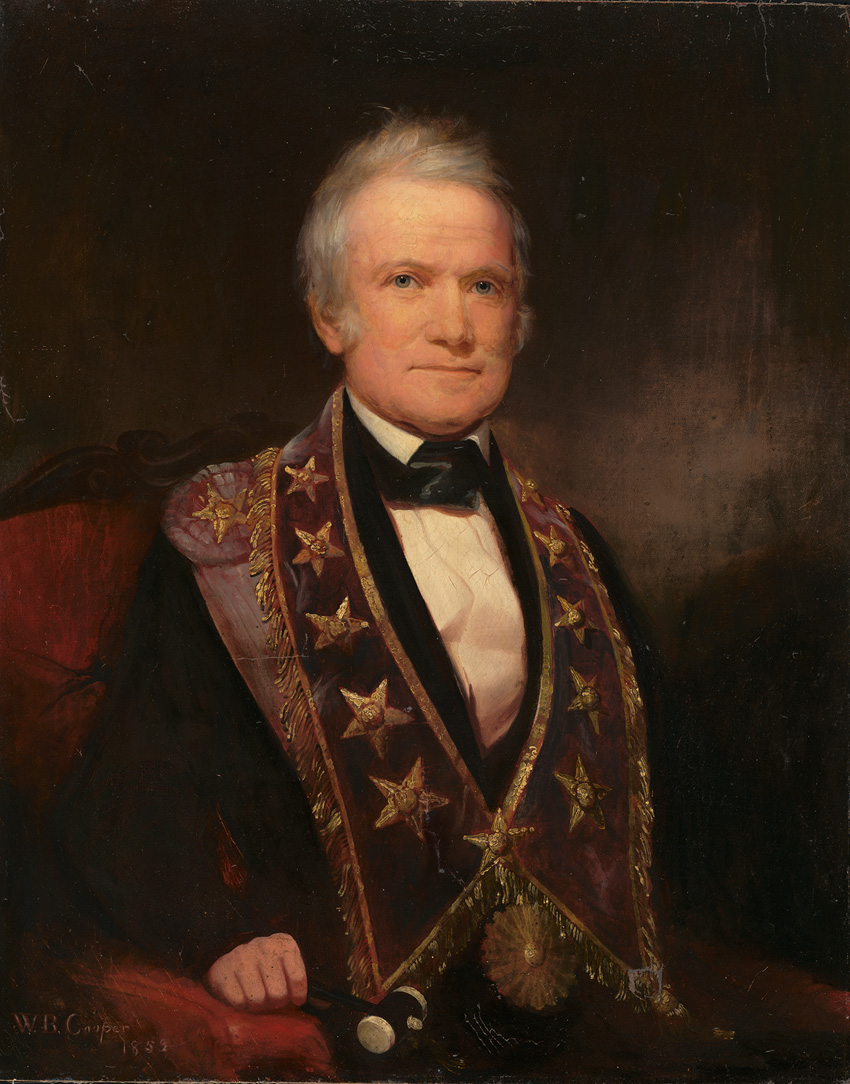
Wilkins Tannehill in Masonic regalia by Washington Cooper

- Hayashi Tadasu, Japanese diplomat
- Alphonso Taft, U.S. Attorney General and Secretary of War. Kilwinning Lodge No. 356, Ohio.
- William Howard Taft, U.S. president. Made a Mason at Sight inside Kilwinning Lodge No. 356, Ohio, 18 February 1909. Honorary member of the Lodge of King Solomon's Temple No. 3464.
- Rabindranath Tagore, Bengali poet, philosopher, writer and novelist
- Mehmed Talat, Grand Vizier of the Ottoman Empire. Initiated into Macedonia Risorta Lodge, Thessaloniki, 1903. First Grand Master of Ottoman Grand Orient (1909–1910).
- Charles Maurice de Talleyrand-Périgord, French secularized clergyman, statesman, and diplomat
- William B. Taliaferro, American soldier and politician. Grand Master of Virginia (1875–76).
- Wilkins F. Tannehill (1787–1858), 12th mayor of Nashville, Tennessee
- John S. Tanner, congressman from 1989 to 2011 representing the 8th Tennessee District. 33rd Degree of the Scottish Rite Southern Jurisdiction.
- J.R.D. Tata, Indian businessman and aviator.
- John Louis Taylor, first Chief Justice of North Carolina. Sixth and Tenth Grand Master of the Grand Lodge of North Carolina.
- W. F. Taylor, Canadian ice hockey administrator and dentist. Freemason in the Scottish Rite Prince Rupert Lodge AF and AM.
- Waller Taylor, first U.S. senator from Indiana. Vincennes Lodge No. 1, Vincennes, Indiana.
- Geoffrey Taylour, 4th Marquess of Headfort, British politician and army officer. Lodge of Assistance No 2773, London (UGLE).
- Thomas Taylour, 3rd Marquess of Headfort, Irish peer and politician. Multiple lodges including No 244 at Kells, Ireland. Head of the Masonic Order of the Red Cross of Constantine.
- Thomas Telford, Scottish architect and civil engineer
- Christian Tell, Romanian politician, revolutionary, mayor of Bucharest
- Robert Heberton Terrell, African American judge and civil rights activist
- Edward O'Connor Terry, English actor and comedian. Savage Club Lodge No 2190, London (UGLE).
- Fred Terry, English actor and actor-manager. Green Room Lodge No. 2957, London (UGLE).
- Jon Tester, member of the U.S. Senate representing Montana. Past master of Treasure Lodge No. 98 in Big Sandy, Montana.
- Frederic Thesiger, 1st Viscount Chelmsford, British colonial administrator, Governor-General of India (1916–1921). Grand Master of New South Wales (1910–13).
- Aleksandar Teodorov-Balan, Bulgarian linguist, historian and bibliographer, Grandmaster in the lodge of Bulgaria.
- Danny Thomas, American-Lebanese comedian, singer, actor, producer, and philanthropist. Founder of St. Jude Children's Research Hospital.
- Dave Thomas, founder of Wendy's. Raised as a Master Mason in Sol. D. Bayless Lodge No. 359, Fort Wayne, Indiana. Although he joined Scottish Rite in the Northern Masonic Jurisdiction, he received the 33rd degree in 1995 from the Southern Jurisdiction.
- James Thornhill, English painter
- Matthew Thornton, signer of the United States Declaration of Independence
- Bertel Thorvaldsen (1770–1844), Danish-Icelandic sculptor
- Strom Thurmond, U.S. senator from South Carolina and segregationist candidate for the United States presidency in 1948
- John Tipton, American politician
- Alfred von Tirpitz, German Imperial Navy admiral. Zum Aufrichtigen Herzen at Frankfurt-Oder.
- Nicolae Titulescu, Romanian diplomat, government minister, president of the League of Nations
- Daniel D. Tompkins, sixth U.S. vice president and governor of New York (1774–1825). First Sovereign Grand Commander of the Northern Masonic Jurisdiction, 1813–25.
- Thomas Todd, U.S. Supreme Court Associate Justice (1807–26)
- William R. Tolbert Jr (1913–1980), president of Liberia
- Absalom Austin Townsend (1810–1888), early pioneer of Wisconsin, State Senator, founder of Rough & Ready, CA. Member of Amicitia Lodge No. 25, Shullsburg, WI.
- Thomas Henry Tracy (1848–1925), Canadian architect, master of St. John's Lodge 209a (1875–1876)
- Hugh Trevor-Roper, Baron Dacre of Glanton (1914–2003), British historian and peer; protagonist of the Hitler Diaries controversy. Apollo University Lodge, Oxford.
- Robert Trimble, U.S. Supreme Court Associate Justice (1826–28). Union #16 in Paris, Kentucky.
- Tommy Trinder, English comedian
- David Trippier, British conservative politician (MP 1979–1992). Provincial Grand Master of East Lancashire.
- Henry Baker Tristram, English ornithologist and Biblical scholar
- Anthony Trollope, English novelist
- Rafael Trujillo, Dictator of the Dominican Republic
- Harry S. Truman, U.S. president. Belton Lodge No. 450, Belton, Missouri. Grand Master of Missouri, 1940–41.
- William Tubman (1895–1971), president of Liberia
- Kurt Tucholsky, German journalist, satirist and writer
- Richard Tucker, operatic tenor. Member of Perfect Ashlar Lodge No. 604, New York.
- George Turner, 18th Premier of Victoria, first Treasurer of Australia. Senior Grand Warden of the United Grand Lodge of Victoria, 1896.
- István Türr (1825–1908), Hungarian soldier, revolutionary, canal architect and engineer.
- Otumfuo Nana Osei Tutu II, Asantehene
- Mark Twain – see: Samuel Langhorne Clemens at List of Freemasons (A – D)
- Richard Tyson, American actor
- Eric Martin M. Taghoy, Engineer

== U ==
- William B. Umstead (1895–1954), U.S. senator from and 63rd governor of North Carolina
- Charles L. Underhill (1867–1946), congressman from Massachusetts. Received degrees in Soley Lodge, Somerville, Massachusetts, in 1900–01.
- Edwin S. Underhill (1861–1929), congressman from New York. Member of Steuben Lodge No. 112, Bath, New York, receiving degrees on 16 March, 20 April, and 18 May 1887.
- Cecil H. Underwood (1922–2008), 25th and 32nd governor of West Virginia from 1957 until 1961 and from 1997 until 2001. Both the youngest and the oldest person ever to serve as governor of West Virginia. He was also the first guest on the television game show To Tell the Truth. Raised in Phoenix Lodge No. 73, Sistersville, West Virginia, in May 1955.
- Joseph R. Underwood (1791–1876), congressman and U.S. senator from Kentucky. Member of Allen Lodge No. 24 in Glasgow, Kentucky.
- Oscar Underwood (1862–1929), congressman and U.S. senator from Alabama. Member of Fraternal Lodge No. 384 in Birmingham.
- William H. Upham (1841–1924), 18th governor of Wisconsin
- Rafael Urdaneta (1788–1845), Venezuelan general
- Justo José de Urquiza (1801– 1870), president of the Argentine Confederation from 1854 to 1860. Member "Jorge Washington" Lodge No. 44 at Concepción, Argentina.

== V ==
- Alexandru Vaida-Voevod, three-time prime minister of Romania
- Charles H. Vail, American clergyman and author of The Ancient Mysteries and Modern Masonry
- George Vail (21 July 1809 – 23 May 1875), congressman from New Jersey. Member of Cincinnati Lodge No. 3, Morristown, New Jersey, receiving degrees in July through August 1833.
- William N. Vaile (22 June 1876 – 2 July 1927), congressman from Colorado. Raised 8 July 1911, in Union Lodge No. 7, Denver, and charter member and first junior warden of Arvada Lodge No. 141 at Arvada in 1912 and served as Master in 1914. Grand Master of Grand Lodge of Colorado, 1924 to 1925.
- Đorđe Vajfert (1850–1937), Serbian industrialist of German descent, governor of the National Bank of Serbia and later Yugoslavia
- Leroy Valliant (1839–1913), chief justice of the Supreme Court of Missouri
- Edward Virginius Valentine (12 November 1838 – 19 October 1930, American sculptor. Member of Dove Lodge No. 21, Richmond, Virginia.
- Clement Vallandigham (29 July 1820 – 17 June 1871), congressman from Ohio. Member of St. Johns Lodge No. 13 of Dayton.
- François Christophe de Kellermann, 1st Duke of Valmy (28 May 1735 – 23 September 1820), French military commander, later the Général d'Armée, and a Marshal of France. In 1805 he was Grand Administrateur, 33°, of the Grand Orient of France.
- Jacob Van Braam (1 April 1729 – 1 August 1792), Dutch swordmaster and mercenary who served as Washington's French translator during the American Revolution. Member of Fredericksburg Lodge No. 4, Fredericksburg, Virginia.
- Pierre Van Cortlandt (10 January 1721 – 1 May 1814), first lieutenant governor of New York, serving 18 years, from 1777 to 1795. President of the convention at Kingston which framed the first constitution of New York in 1777. Listed as the first master of Cortlandt Lodge No. 34 of Peekskill, New York, on 10 December 1804.
- Willis Van Devanter (17 April 1859 – 8 February 1941), Associate Justice of the Supreme Court of the United States. Member of Acacia Lodge No. 11 and the Scottish Rite at Cheyenne, Wyoming.
- Jeff Van Drew (b. 23 February 1953), congressman from New Jersey. Member of Cannon Lodge, No. 104, South Seaville, New Jersey.
- Vedder Van Dyck (18 July 1889 – 2 August 1960), fifth bishop of the Episcopal Diocese of Vermont. Mason, with membership in Amityville, New York.
- Nicholas Van Dyke, Jr. (20 December 1770 – 21 May 1826), congressman and U.S. senator from Delaware. Master of St. John's Lodge No. 2, New Castle, Delaware, in 1815.
- Walter Van Dyke (1823–1905), Justice of the California Supreme Court. Member of Arcata Lodge No. 106, Arcata, California.
- Blake R. Van Leer (1893–1956), president of Georgia Tech, inventor, engineer, civil rights advocate.
- Robert Van Pelt (9 September 1897 – 27 April 1988), federal judge from Nebraska. Received degrees in 1918 in Stockville, Nebraska, and was later a member of Cambridge Lodge No. 150, Cambridge, Nebraska. 33° of the Scottish Rite (Southern Jurisdiction) and Shriner.
- Jeremiah Van Rensselaer (27 August 1738 – 19 February 1810), representative from New York to the first United States Congress. Member of Masters' Lodge No. 2, Albany, New York.
- Killian K. Van Rensselaer (9 June 1763 – 18 June 1845), congressman from New York. Member of Masters' Lodge No. 2, Albany, in 1787.
- Stephen Van Rensselaer (1 November 1764 – 26 January 1839), lieutenant governor of New York and congressman from New York. 10th richest American of all time. Founder of Rensselaer Polytechnic Institute. Grand master of the Grand Lodge of New York, 1825–29.
- Samuel Rinnah Van Sant (11 May 1844 – 3 October 1936), congressman from and 15th governor of Minnesota. Became a member of Snow Lodge No. 44, Le Claire, Iowa, in 1869, and affiliated with Winona Lodge No. 18, Winona, Minnesota, in 1894.
- Abraham Van Vechten (5 December 1762 – 6 January 1837), American lawyer and a Federalist politician who served twice as New York State Attorney General. Member of Masters' Lodge No. 2, Albany, in 1787.
- Murray Van Wagoner (18 March 1898 – 12 June 1986), 38th governor of Michigan. Member of Pontiac Lodge No. 21, Pontiac.
- Charles C. Van Zandt (10 August–4 June 1894), 34th governor of Rhode Island. Member of St. Johns Lodge No. 1, Newport.
- James E. Van Zandt (18 December 1898 – 6 January 1986), congressman from Pennsylvania. Member of Hiram Lodge No. 616, Altoona, receiving degrees on 15 April, 20 May, and 24 June 1926.
- Authur "Dazzy" Vance (4 March 1891 – 16 February 1961), member of the Baseball Hall of Fame. Raised 23 March 1926 in Clearwater Lodge No. 127, Clearwater, Florida.
- Joseph Vance (21 March 1786 – 24 August 1852), 13th governor of Ohio. Member of Harmony Lodge No. 8, Urbana, and was Master in 1817.
- Robert Vance (24 April 1828 – 28 November 1899), congressman from North Carolina. Grand Master of North Carolina in 1868 to 1869.
- Zebulon Vance (13 May 1830 – 14 April 1894), Confederate military officer in the American Civil War, the 37th and 43rd governor of North Carolina, and U.S. senator. A bronze of him stands in the National Statuary Hall Collection. The towns of Zebulon and Vanceboro as well as Vance County, all in North Carolina, are named for him. He petitioned Mt. Hermon Lodge #118 in Asheville and was raised on 20 June 1853. He was one of the founders of Excelsior Lodge #261 in Charlotte in 1867.
- Arthur H. Vandenberg (22 March 1884 – 18 April 1951), U.S. senator from Michigan. Raised 8 May 1907 at Grand River Lodge No. 34, Grand Rapids.
- William Vandever (31 March 1817 – 23 July 1893), congressman from California and Iowa, and a general in the Union Army during the American Civil War. Member of Dubuque Lodge No. 3, Dubuque, Iowa.
- James K. Vardaman (26 July 1861 – 25 June 1930), U.S. senator from and 36th governor of Mississippi
- William Scott Vare (24 December 1867 – 7 August 1934), U.S. senator and congressman from Pennsylvania. Member of Vaux Lodge No. 383 in Philadelphia.
- José María Vargas (10 March 1786 – 13 July 1854), third president of Venezuela
- Charles Varnum (21 June 1849 – 26 February 1936), Medal of Honor recipient and commander of the scouts for George Armstrong Custer in the Little Bighorn Campaign during the Great Sioux War. Life member of Olive Branch Lodge No. 47, Sturgis, South Dakota, from 1881.
- James Mitchell Varnum (17 December 1748 – 9 January 1789), American legislator, lawyer, general in the Continental Army during the Revolutionary War, and a pioneer to the Ohio Country. Member of St. John's Lodge No. 1, Providence, Rhode Island. His Masonic funeral at what is now Marietta, Ohio, was the first Masonic gathering in the Northwest Territory of record.
- Pashko Vasa (30 June 1825 – 29 June 1892), Albanian writer, poet and publicist of the Albanian National Awakening, and governor of Lebanon from 1882 until his death
- Harry H. Vaughan (26 November 1893 – 20 May 1981), U.S. Army major general and aide to Harry S. Truman. Mason, National Sojourner, and member of Almas Shrine Temple, Washington, D.C.
- Horace Worth Vaughan (2 December 1867 – 10 November 1922), U.S. Territorial Representative representing Hawaii, and a federal judge. Originally from Texas, he was raised in Border Lodge No. 672, Texarkana, on 7 May 1897 and was Master from 1899 to 1904. Was Grand Orator of Grand Lodge of Texas in 1912.
- Richard Vaux (19 December 1816 – 22 March 1895), congressman from Pennsylvania. Raised in Lodge No. 3 in Philadelphia on 21 February 1843. As Grand Master of the Grand Lodge of Pennsylvania, he laid the cornerstone of the Philadelphia Masonic Temple in 1868.
- James C. Veatch (19 December 1819 – 22 December 1895), Union general during the American Civil War. Member of Rockport Lodge No. 112, Rockport, Indiana.
- Ivan Vedar, founder of freemasonry in Bulgaria.
- Pierre-Théodore Verhaegen, founder of the Belgian Liberal Party
- Claude Hamilton Verity (1880–1949), inventor of the Veritiphone, an early method of synchronisation of sound and film.
- Claude Joseph Vernet (14 August 1714 – 3 December 1789), French painter
- Émile Jean-Horace Vernet (30 June 1789 – 17 January 1863), French painter
- George Graham Vest (6 December 1830 – 9 August 1904), U.S. senator from Missouri. Best known for his "Man's best friend" closing arguments from the trial in which damages were sought for the killing of a dog named Old Drum on 18 October 1869.
- Albert Henry Vestal (18 January 1875 – 1 April 1932), congressman from Indiana. Member of Mt. Moriah Lodge No. 77, Anderson, Indiana, receiving degrees on 31 May, 1 and 2 June 1922.
- Gabriel González Videla (22 November 1898 – 22 August 1980), 26th president of Chile. Member of Luz Esperanza Lodge No. 11 at La Serena.
- Egbert Ludovicus Viele (17 June 1825 – 22 April 1902), congressman from New York and Union Army general during the American Civil War. Member of Kane Lodge No. 545, New York City.
- Feliciano Viera (1872–1927), 47th president of Uruguay. Member of the Grand Orient of Uruguay.
- Armando Villegas, Colombian painter
- George Villers, See 2nd Duke of Buckingham
- Bird J. Vincent (6 March 1880 – 18 July 1931), congressman from Michigan. Member of Ancient Landmarks Lodge No. 303, Saginaw, having receiving degrees on 10 June, 30 June, and 4 July 1909.
- John Vining (23 December 1758–February 1802), U.S. senator, U.S. congressman, and Continental congressman from Delaware. Member of Lodge No. 63 at Lewis Town, Delaware.
- Fred M. Vinson, Chief Justice of the United States (1946–1953)
- Swami Vivekananda, Hindu reformist/revivalist leader (1863–1902)
- John Charles Vivian (30 June 1889 – 10 February 1964), 30th governor of Colorado. Member of Golden City Lodge No. 1, Golden, Colorado.
- François-Marie Arouet (Voltaire) (1694–1778), French Enlightenment writer, historian and philosopher. Initiated in 1778 by WM Ben Franklin, Loge des Neuf Sœurs, Paris. He received only the First Degree, dying less than two months later.
- Daniel W. Voorhees (26 September 1827 – 10 April 1897), U.S. senator and congressman from Indiana
- Foster McGowan Voorhees (5 November 1856 – 14 June 1927), 30th governor of New Jersey. Raised 17 February 1899 in Washington Lodge No. 33, Elizabeth.
- Ignaz von Born, Hungarian nobleman and naturalist
- Traian Vuia, Romanian inventor and early aviation pioneer
- Charles W. Vursell (8 February 1881 – 21 September 1974), congressman from Illinois. Member of Marion Lodge No. 130, Salem, Illinois, receiving degrees on 19 September, 20 October, and 27 November 1906.

== W ==
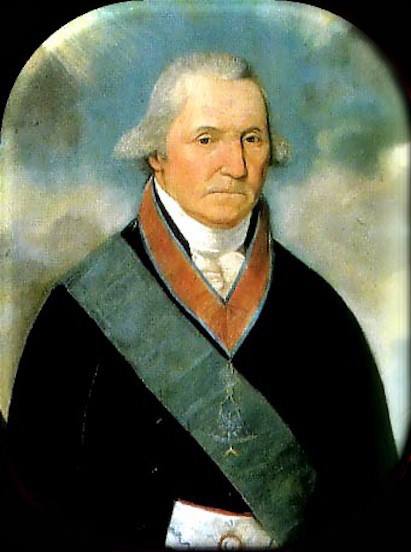
George Washington in Masonic regalia by William Williams

- Robert Wadlow, tallest man recorded. Franklin Lodge No. 25, Alton, Illinois.
- Elijah Wadsworth, Ohio militia general. Master of the Erie Lodge (later Western Star Lodge No. 21) in Ohio, 1813.
- Honus Wagner, Major League Baseball shortstop
- Jonathan Wainwright, World War II general. Union Lodge No. 7, Junction City, Kansas, 1946.
- A. E. Waite, writer on occult and esoteric matters, and Freemasonry
- Rick Wakeman, musician. Member of Chelsea Lodge No. 3098.
- Darnell Lamont Walker (1982-), Emmy-nominated television writer; American filmmaker; Published Author. Initiated in Hercules Lodge #17 Washington
- Lew Wallace, author of Ben-Hur: A Tale of the Christ, governor of the New Mexico Territory, and Union general in the American Civil War. Fountain Lodge No. 60, Indiana.
- John Ward, 1st Viscount Dudley and Ward, British peer and politician. Grand Master, Grand Lodge of England.
- Walter Wardle (1900–1982), British Anglican clergyman, and Archdeacon of Gloucester. Apollo University Lodge, Oxford.
- Tobias Watkins (1780–1855), American physician, editor, writer, educator, and political appointee. Grand Master of the Grand Lodge of Maryland 1813–14 and 1816–18; first High Priest of the Encampment of the Knights Templar in 1812.
- Henry Ware (1830–1909), British Anglican bishop. Initiated in Underlay Lodge No 1074 (UGLE), and the first bishop to serve as Grand Chaplain of the UGLE (1895).
- Harry M. Warner, film producer and co-founder of Warner Bros. Mount Olive Lodge No. 506, California.
- Jack L. Warner (1892–1978), film producer and co-founder of Warner Bros. Mount Olive Lodge No. 506, California.
- Jack M. Warner (1916–1995), film producer. Raised 30 November 1938, Mount Olive Lodge No. 506, California.
- Samuel L. Warner, film producer and co-founder of Warner Bros. Mount Olive Lodge No. 506, California.
- Sir Charles Warren, English archaeologist. Surveyor of Herod's Temple. Royal Lodge of Friendship No. 278, Gibraltar. Founding Master of Quatuor Coronati Lodge of Research.
- Earl Warren, Chief Justice of the United States (1953–69). Grand Master of California, 1935–36.
- Joseph Warren, American physician and major general during the American Revolutionary War. Joined the Lodge of Saint Andrew in Boston, later serving as Grand Master of Masons in Massachusetts.
- Booker T. Washington, American educator, president of Tuskegee Normal and Industrial Institute, author of Up from Slavery in 1901. Mason at Sight.
- George Washington, general, politician, and first president of the United States. Initiated in Fredericksburg, Virginia, Past Master of Alexandria Lodge No. 22, Virginia.
- Reginald Waterfield (1867–1967), English Anglican clergyman, archdeacon, and Dean of Hereford Cathedral. Provincial Grand Master (UGLE) of Herefordshire from 1923 to 1946. The Dean Waterfield Lodge No 8089 in Hereford is named after him.
- Elkanah Watson, businessman in the American Revolution, associate of John Brown (Rhode Island politician)
- James Watt, Scottish inventor and engineer, Royal Society. Initiated in a Scottish Lodge in 1763.
- John Wayne, American actor. Marion McDaniel Lodge No. 56, Arizona.
- Thomas Smith Webb, New England Lodge No. 4, Worthington, Ohio. Author of Freemason's Monitor or Illustrations of Masonry, sometimes called the "Founding Father of the York or American Rite" for his efforts to promote that Masonic body.
- Adam Weishaupt, founder of the Illuminati
- James Welldon (1854–1937), Headmaster of Harrow School, Chaplain to Queen Victoria, and Metropolitan Bishop of Calcutta
- William Wentworth, Australian statesman. Lodge of Australia, Sydney, New South Wales.
- Charles H. Wesley, historian, educator, college president, publisher of more than 15 books on African-American history. Hiram Lodge No. 4, Prince Hall Affiliation, Washington, D.C.
- Samuel Wesley, English composer
- John Austin Wharton (died 1838), Texian soldier and statesman, "the keenest blade of San Jacinto."_{Campbell, Randolph B. "Mike" (August 26, 2020). "Wharton, John Austin (1806–1838)". Handbook of Texas Online. Texas State Historical Association. Retrieved June 1, 2023.}
- Philip Wharton, 1st Duke of Wharton, English politician, atheist and reputed founder of the Hellfire Club
- Jimmy Wheeler, British comedian
- James Monroe Whitfield (1822–1871), African American poet, abolitionist, and political activist. Grand Master of California (Prince Hall Masonry).
- Oscar Wilde, Irish playwright, novelist, and poet. Apollo University Lodge No. 357, Oxford (UGLE).
- John Wilkes, English politician and journalist
- William IV, King of Great Britain; UGLE
- Warren William (1894–1948), Broadway and Hollywood actor, nicknamed the "King of Pre-Code".
- Watkin Williams (1845–1944), British Anglican bishop. Initiated in Apollo University Lodge No 357 (Oxford), and Grand Chaplain of the UGLE.
- Delano E. Williamson (1822–1903), Indiana Attorney General, Royal Arch Mason.
- Hubert Willis, British stage and film actor. Lodge of Asaph No. 1319.
- Benjamin Willoughby (1855–1940), Justice of the Indiana Supreme Court, Scottish Rite Mason, twice elected as Representative of the Grand Lodge of Illinois
- Gustaf Wilson, Finnish American pioneer and businessman, Scottish Rite Mason
- James Wilson, co-founder of the Orange Order
- Ralph Wilson, American businessman and founder of the Buffalo Bills of the NFL. Member of Kilwinning Lodge No. 297 in Detroit.
- Roger Wilson, British Anglican bishop and member of the British Royal Household. Grand Chaplain of UGLE 1957–58.
- Frederick Thomas Wimble, Australian politician and founding editor of The Cairns Post
- Jeff Winter, English football referee
- Sir Pelham Grenville Wodehouse, KBE, (1881 – 1975), also known as P.G. Wodehouse, English writer, novelist and creator of Jeeves and Wooster.
- Donald Wolfit, English actor
- Alan Wolstencroft (1937–2020), English clergyman and Archdeacon of Manchester. Worsley Lodge No 1814 (UGLE).
- Leonard Wood, American physician, general, and colonial administrator
- Stephen J. Wood, American politician, Webster Mason Lodge 164
- Levi Woodbury, U.S. Supreme Court Associate Justice (1845–51)
- Adolphus Frederick Alexander Woodford, English clergyman noted for pioneering Masonic research. Founder of Quatuor Coronati Lodge of Research.
- Edward Sydney Woods (1877–1953), English clergyman and author, Bishop of Lichfield. Waddon Lodge No 4162 (UGLE).
- William B. Woods, U.S. Supreme Court Associate Justice (1881–87)
- William Culham Woodward, second president of Woodward's Stores Ltd in Canada and lieutenant governor of British Columbia, 1941–46
- Clarendon Worrell, Archbishop of Nova Scotia and primate of the Anglican Church of Canada
- Steve Wozniak, co-founder of Apple Computer. Charity Lodge No. 362, Campbell, California.
- Christopher Wren, English architect. Master of Lodge Original, No. 1, now the Lodge of Antiquity No. 2, "adopted" 18 May 1691.
- Marcellus E. Wright Sr., American architect; Scottish Rite Masonry
- John Wrightson (1840–1916), pioneer in agricultural education. Cotteswold Lodge No 593.
- William Wyler, film director and producer. Loyalty Lodge No. 529, California.
- Ed Wynn, American actor and comedian. Lodge No. 9, Pennsylvania.

== X ==
- Madame de Xaintrailles, (?–?), Republican heroine of the French Revolution. While wearing the uniform of a major of cavalry, she presented an aide-de-camp's commission to the lodge of Les Freres Aristes. It was resolved that the first degree (not of Adoptive Masonry but of real Masonry) should be conferred on a lady who had displayed the courage and virtues of a man.
- Emmanuil Xanthos (1772–1852), a founder of the Filiki Eteria.

== Y ==
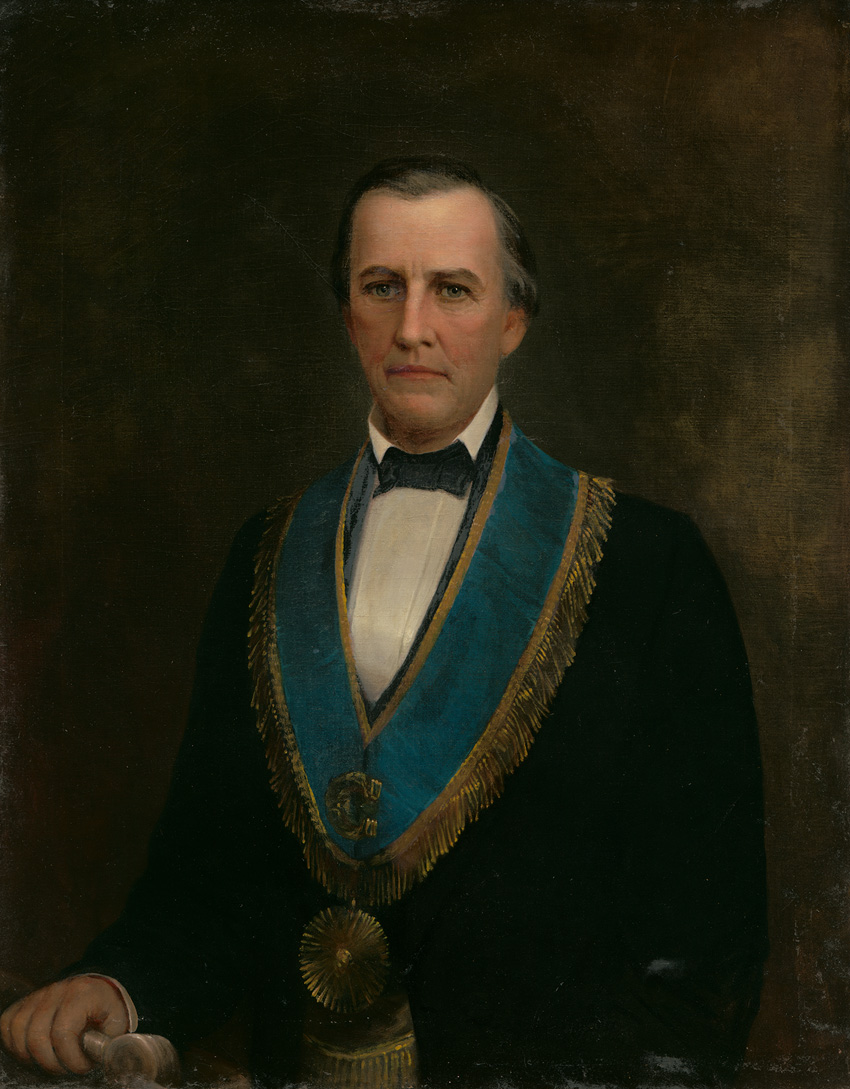
Archibald Yell in Masonic regalia by Washington Cooper

- John Yarker, English occultist. 1° Lodge of Integrity Lodge No. 189 (later 163) Manchester, 25 October 1854, affiliated with Fidelity Lodge No. 623, 27 April 1855. Expelled from the Ancient and Accepted Rite and demitted (from all regular Freemasonry), 1862.
- Joseph C. Yates (1768–1837), seventh governor of New York. Master of St. George's Lodge No. 6, Schenectady, from 1791 to 1796 and 1798.
- Richard Yates Sr. (1815–1873), U.S. senator and congressman from and 13th governor of Illinois. Raised 26 May 1847 in Harmony Lodge No. 3, Jacksonville, Illinois.
- Richard Yates Jr. (1860–1936), congressman from and 22nd governor of Illinois. Became member of Harmony Lodge No. 3, Jacksonville, Illinois, on 27 June 1882. Grand orator of the Grand Lodge of Illinois in 1901.
- William Yates (1720–1764), American clergyman in the colonial Church of England and fifth president of the College of William & Mary. Received degrees in Williamsburg Lodge No. 6, Williamsburg, Virginia, on 3 August 1773, 12 November 1773, and 28 May 1774.
- Francis Yeats-Brown (1886–1944), DFC officer of the British Indian army and author of The Lives of a Bengal Lancer
- Archibald Yell (1797–1847), congressman from and second governor of Arkansas. First master of Shelbyville Lodge No. 49, Shelbyville, Tennessee, in 1824. Elected grand master of the Grand Lodge of Tennessee in 1831. Founded what is now Washington Lodge No. 1, at Fayetteville, Arkansas.
- Duke of York (1920–1936) (See King George VI)
- Third Duke of York and Albany (See Prince Frederick, Duke of York and Albany)
- Dominique You (sometimes Youx) (ca 1775–15 November 1830), privateer, pirate, and later politician. Artillery commander of gunners recruited from pirate ships at the Battle of New Orleans under General Andrew Jackson. Member of Lodge La Concorde of New Orleans, according to a certificate dated June 1811.
- Brigham Young, Mormon leader. Nauvoo Lodge, Illinois, April 1842. (Later that year, Nauvoo Lodge was declared clandestine by the Grand Lodge of Illinois, and its members were suspended.)
- Coleman Young (1918–1997), American politician, mayor of Detroit from 1974 to 1993
- Denton T. "Cy" Young, baseball player. Raised 1904 in Mystic Tie Lodge No. 194, Dennison, Ohio.
- Lafayette Young (1848–1926), U.S. senator from Iowa. Received the degrees in Pymosa Lodge No. 271, Atlantic, Iowa, and was admitted to Home Lodge No. 370 of Des Moines on 9 October 1890.
- Richard M. Young (1798–1861), U.S. senator from Illinois. Member of Bodley Lodge No. 1, Quincy, Illinois, but demitted during the anti-Masonic period.
- Luther Youngdahl (1896–1978), 27th governor of Minnesota. Received degrees in Minneapolis Lodge No. 19 in 1920 and withdrew in 1923 to affiliate with University Lodge No. 316. Affiliated with Lake Harriet Lodge No. 277 on 17 February 1925 and served as master in 1938.
- Oscar Youngdahl (1893–1946), congressman from Minnesota. Received degrees in Lakeview Lodge No. 143, Ortonville, Minnesota, in 1918, withdrawing in 1923 to affiliate with University Lodge No. 316.
- J. Arthur Younger (1893–1967), congressman from California
- George C. Yount (1794–1865), California pioneer who was the first permanent northern European settler in the Napa Valley. Yountville, California, is named for him. Made a Freemason in Benicia Lodge No. 5 in 1850; assisted in the organization of Yount Lodge No. 12 of Napa; and in 1855 organized Caymus Lodge No. 93 at Yountville, was the lodge's first junior warden, holding some office every year thereafter until his death, and was master in 1859. He was grand Bible bearer of the Grand Lodge of California. Yount Lodge No. 12 in Napa is named for him.
- David Levy Yulee (1810–1886), U.S. senator from Florida. Member of Hayward Lodge No. 7, Gainesville, Florida.

== Z ==
- Saad Zaghloul, Prime Minister of Egypt
- Duiliu Zamfirescu, Romanian novelist, poet, short story writer, lawyer, nationalist politician, journalist, diplomat and memoirist
- Giuseppe Zanardelli (1826–1903), 16th Prime Minister of Italy. A Freemason, after his death the bishop of Brescia refused him a Christian burial, unless the floral offering on the coffin sent by the Italian Freemasons was removed.
- Darryl F. Zanuck (1902–1979), American film producer. Mount Olive Lodge No. 506, California.
- Lorenzo de Zavala (1788–1836), 19th-century Mexican politician of Spanish descent. Vice-president of the Republic of Texas from 16 March 1836 to 22 October 1836. He was first master of La Independencia Lodge (location unidentified).
- Jurji Zaydan (Arabic: جُرْجي زَيْدان, 1861–1914), Lebanese novelist, journalist, editor and teacher
- Germán Zea Hernández, Colombian politician
- Francisco Antonio Zea, Colombian botanist, diplomat, politician, and vice president
- 1st Earl of Zetland (See Lawrence Dundas, 1st Earl of Zetland)
- 2nd Earl of Zetland (See Thomas Dundas, 2nd Earl of Zetland)
- Florenz Ziegfeld, Broadway impresario and founder of the Ziegfeld Follies. Accordia Lodge No. 277, Chicago.
- William Ziegler (1843–1905), American industrialist who was one of the founders of the Royal Baking Powder Company. Organized Arctic expeditions. His original lodge is not known, but in November 1885 he affiliated with Altair Lodge No. 601, Brooklyn.
- Fred R. Zimmerman (1880–1954), 25th governor of Wisconsin
- Orville Zimmerman (1880–1948), congressman from Missouri
- Jovan Jovanović Zmaj, Serbian poet
- Johann Zoffany, German-British painter
- Felix Zollicoffer (1812–1862), congressman from Tennessee, officer of the United States Army, and brigadier general of the Confederate States Army. Killed at the Battle of Mill Springs, Kentucky. Member of Cumberland Lodge No. 8 of Nashville.
- Heinrich Zschokke (1771–1848), German, later Swiss, author and reformer. He was initiated in the lodge "Zur Aufrichtigen Herzen" at Frankfurt. He preached that Freemasonry was the missing link between the church and state, and that only after the broken chain was closed again, would the world attain to higher ideals.
- Adolph Zukor, film producer. Centennial Lodge No. 763, New York.

== See also ==
- List of Freemasons (A–D)
