= Warminster (disambiguation) =

Warminster is a town in Wiltshire, England.

Warminster may also refer to:

== Places ==
- Warminster, Virginia, United States, an unincorporated community
- Warminster Township, Pennsylvania, United States
- Warminster, a community in the township of Oro-Medonte, Ontario, Canada

== Other ==
- Warminster School, Warminster, England, a co-educational independent day and boarding school
- Warminster railway station, Warminster, England
- Warminster station (SEPTA), in the Pennsylvania township
- Warminster Line, a commuter rail route between the SEPTA station and Philadelphia, Pennsylvania
