= List of Freemasons (A–D) =

This is a list of notable Freemasons. Freemasonry is a fraternal organisation that exists in a number of forms worldwide. Throughout history some members of the fraternity have made no secret of their involvement, while others have not made their membership public. In some cases, membership can only be proven by searching through the fraternity's records. Such records are most often kept at the individual lodge level, and may be lost due to fire, flood, deterioration, or simple carelessness. Grand Lodge governance may have shifted or reorganized, resulting in further loss of records on the member or the name, number, location or even existence of the lodge in question. In areas of the world where Masonry has been suppressed by governments, records of entire grand lodges have been destroyed. Because of this, masonic membership can sometimes be difficult to verify.

Standards of "proof" for those on this list may vary widely; some figures with no verified lodge affiliation are claimed as Masons if reliable sources give anecdotal evidence suggesting they were familiar with the "secret" signs and passes, but other figures are rejected over technical questions of regularity in the lodge that initiated them. Where available, specific lodge membership information is provided; where serious questions of verification have been noted by other sources, this is also indicated.

== A ==
- John Abbott (1821–1893), the third Prime Minister of Canada. Initiated: St. Paul's, No. 374, E.R., Montreal, 1847.
- Joseph Palmer Abbott (1842–1901), Australian politician, 1899
- Robert S. Abbott (1870–1940), African-American lawyer and newspaper publisher
- William "Bud" Abbott (1895–1974), American comedian and actor (part of the Abbott & Costello comedy team)
- Nicanor Abelardo (1893–1934), Filipino composer. Raised in Luzon Lodge No. 57.
- Ralph Abercromby (1734–1801), Scottish soldier (lieutenant-general in the British Army) and politician (MP 1774–1780, 1784–1786)
- Thomas Abernethy (1903–1998), congressman from Mississippi. Received degrees in Eupora Lodge No. 423, Eupora, Mississippi.
- Edmond François Valentin About (1828–1885), French novelist, publicist and journalist
- Harold Abrahams, track and field athlete and Olympic champion. Initiated into Oxford and Cambridge University Lodge No.1118, and founding member of Athlon Lodge No. 4674.
- Benjamin Abrams (1893–1967), Romanian-born American businessman and a founder of the Emerson Radio & Phonograph Corporation. Member of Farragut Lodge No. 976, New York City.
- Franz Abt (1819–1885), German composer and choral conductor. Initiated in Brunswick Lodge in 1853.
- Sir Thomas Dyke Acland, 11th Baronet (1809–1898), British education reformer and politician. Member of the Apollo University Lodge.
- Richard Acland (1906–1990), founder of the Campaign for Nuclear Disarmament. Member of the Apollo University Lodge.
- Roy Acuff (1903–1992), American country music singer
- Major General Sir Allan Adair, 6th Baronet, GCVO, CB, DSO, MC & Bar, JP, DL (1897–1988), British Army general who served in both World Wars. Household Brigade Lodge No. 2614 and appointed Assistant Grand Master of the G.L. of England in 1953.
- E. Ross Adair (1907–1983), congressman from Indiana. Raised in Albion Lodge No. 97, Albion, Indiana.
- Robert Adair, 1st Baron Waveney (1811–1886), British politician
- Robert Adam (1728–1792), Scottish architect
- Alva Adams (1850–1922), three-time governor of Colorado. Member of the Supreme Council of the Scottish Rite (Southern Jurisdiction).
- Alva B. Adams (1875–1941), U.S. senator from Colorado
- Andrew Adams (1736–1797), delegate for Connecticut to the Continental Congress and later Chief Justice of the Connecticut Supreme Court. Member of St. Paul's Lodge No. 11, Litchfield, Connecticut.
- Charles Adams (1876–1947), American businessman and sports promoter. Was a Knight Templar and Shriner.
- Courtney Adams (1981-), American Visual Artist and pioneer of Cubo-Expressionistic Primitivism. Raised in West University Lodge No. 1292
- Frank R. Adams (1883–1963), American author, screenwriter, composer, and newspaper reporter
- Jasper Adams (1793–1841), American clergyman, college professor, and college president. Raised in Mt. Vernon Lodge No. 4, Providence, Rhode Island.
- Sherman Adams (1899–1986), American politician (elected to U.S. Congress and as governor of New Hampshire)
- Samuel Adams (1805–1850), third governor of Arkansas. Junior Warden pro-tem of the Grand Lodge of Arkansas in 1844.
- Wilbur L. Adams (1884–1937), American lawyer and politician from Delaware. Served as congressman from Delaware.
- Henry Adamson (1581–1639), Scottish poet and historian. Wrote one of the earliest known references to the Mason's Word.
- Michael Adeane, Baron Adeane Lieutenant-Colonel, GCB, GCVO, PC (1910–1984), Private Secretary to Queen Elizabeth II during the first twenty years of her reign and to her father, King George VI prior. Served as Senior Grand Deacon of the Grand Lodge of England in 1946.
- Charles Adkins (1863–1941), congressman from Illinois
- Jesse C. Adkins (1879–1955), U.S. federal judge in the District Court for the District of Columbia
- Julius Ochs Adler (1892–1955), American publisher, journalist, and U.S. Army general. Member of Justice Lodge No. 753 of New York City.
- Adolphus Frederick IV, Duke of Mecklenburg-Strelitz (1738–1794), Duke of Mecklenburg-Strelitz. Member of the Lodge at New-Brandeburg.
- Adolf Frederick (1710–1771), King of Sweden from 1751 until his death. Master of a Stockholm lodge and received the title of Protector of Swedish Freemasonry in 1762.
- Ignacio Agramonte (1841–1873), Cuban revolutionary who played an important part in the Ten Years' War (1868–1878)
- Gregorio Aglipay (1860–1940), Supreme Bishop of the Philippine Independent Church
- Emilio Aguinaldo (1869–1964), President of the Philippines. Pilar Lodge No. 203 (now Pilar Lodge No. 15) at Imus Cavite and was founder of Magdalo Lodge No. 31 (renamed Emilio Aguinaldo Lodge No. 31 in his honor).
- Granville Pearl Aikman (1858–1923), State of Kansas district judge and suffragist
- William David Blakeslee Ainey (1864–1932), Republican member of the U.S. House of Representatives from Pennsylvania
- John C. Ainsworth (1822–1893), American pioneer businessman and steamboat owner in Oregon. Helped organize the Grand Lodge of Oregon and served as grand master 1854–55.
- Milburn Akers (1900–1970), Chicago journalist, chairman of the Board of Trustees of McKendree College, and the ninth president of Shimer College
- Aretas Akers-Douglas, 1st Viscount Chilston (1851–1926), British politician and Home Secretary. Member of the Apollo University Lodge.
- George Edward Akerson (1889–1937), American journalist, and the first official White House Press Secretary. Received 32° in Minneapolis 27 February 1929.
- Adeyemo Alakija KBE (1884–1952), Nigerian lawyer, politician and businessman. Co-founded the Daily Times of Nigeria. Member, Star of Nigeria Chapter No. 255, R.A.M. 23° AASR.
- Miguel Ricardo de Álava y Esquivel Order of Santiago, Order of Charles III, KCB, MWO (1770–1843), Spanish general and statesman. Imprisoned in 1814 for being a Freemason.
- Juan Bautista Alberdi (1810–1884), Argentine political theorist and diplomat
- Prince Albert Victor, Duke of Clarence and Avondale (1864–1892), eldest son of King Edward VII
- Carl Albert (1908–2000), American politician. Speaker of the United States House of Representatives from 1971 to 1977. Member of South McAlester Lodge No. 96, McAlester, Okla. (1946), 32° Indian Consistory, AASR (SJ) and DeMolay Legion of Honor.
- Horace M. Albright (1890–1987), American conservationist
- James L. Alcorn (1816–1894), leading southern white Republican during Reconstruction in Mississippi, where he served as governor and U.S. senator
- Chester Hardy Aldrich (1862–1924), American politician. 16th governor of Nebraska and justice of the Nebraska Supreme Court.
- Nelson W. Aldrich (1841–1915), U.S. senator from Rhode Island. Treasurer of the Grand Lodge of Rhode Island 1877–78 and member of What Cheer lodge.
- Edwin "Buzz" Aldrin (1930–), American astronaut; second human to set foot on extraterrestrial soil. Member of Montclair Lodge No. 144 of New Jersey.
- Elizabeth Aldworth (1693/95–1773/1775), noted female Mason. Entered Apprentice and Fellowcraft Degree in 1712.
- Vasile Alecsandri (1821–1890), Romanian poet, playwright, politician and diplomat
- Miguel Alemán Valdés (1900–1983), President of Mexico from 1946 to 1952. Initiated, Passed, and Raised in Antiquities Lodge No. 9 of Grand Lodge Valle de Mexico. Later demitted to City of Mexico Lodge No. 35.
- Alexander I of Russia (1777–1825), Czar of Russia from 1801 to 1825. Banned all secret societies in 1801, but rescinded the prohibition in 1803. He banned Freemasonry in Russia in 1822 due to concerns of political power of some lodges.
- Alexander I of Yugoslavia (1888–1934), last king of the Kingdom of Serbs, Croats and Slovenes (1921–29) and first king of the Kingdom of Yugoslavia (1929–34)
- Prince Alexander of Yugoslavia (1924–2016), Serbian royal prince, initiated in the GLNF, and a member of multiple UGLE lodges, including Royal Sussex No 53, and Entente Cordiale No 9657
- George F. Alexander (1882–1948), judge of the United States territorial court for the Alaska Territory from 1933 to 1947. President of the Juneau Shrine Club 1934–39.
- Grover Cleveland Alexander (1887–1950), American Major League Baseball pitcher. Raised in St. Paul Lodge No. 82, St. Paul, Nebraska, in 1923. Expelled for un-Masonic conduct in 1930.
- Harold Alexander, 1st Earl Alexander of Tunis KG PC GCB OM GCMG CSI DSO MC CD PC(Can) (1891–1969), British military commander and field marshal. Served in both World Wars. Governor General of Canada from 1946 to 1952. Past grand steward and past grand warden of the G.L. of England.
- Nathaniel Alexander (1756–1808), 13th governor of North Carolina. Officer of the Grand Lodge of North Carolina in 1802, 1803, 1806, 1807 and was senior grand deacon at his death in 1808.
- Alexander, Prince of Orange (1851–1884), heir apparent of King William III of the Netherlands from 11 June 1879 until his death. Grand Master of the Netherlands.
- Bernardo Soto Alfaro (1854–1931), President of Costa Rica from 1885 to 1889. Member of Esperanza Lodge.
- Eloy Alfaro (1842–1912), served as President of Ecuador from 1895 to 1901 and from 1906 to 1911
- Bruce Alger (1918–2015), member of the U.S. House of Representatives from Texas
- Russell A. Alger (1836–1907), 20th governor and U.S. senator from Michigan. U.S. Secretary of War during the Presidential administration of William McKinley. Major general in the Union Army during the American Civil War. Raised in 1895 in Corinthian Lodge No. 241 in Detroit.
- Sir Archibald Alison, 1st Baronet GCB FRSE (1792–1867), Scottish historian
- Tony Allcock, bowls player
- J. Frank Allee (1857–1938), American merchant and politician; U.S. senator from Delaware
- Alfred G. Allen (1867–1932), congressman from Ohio
- Charles Herbert Allen (1848–1934), American politician and businessman. Served in the Massachusetts state legislature and senate, and in the U.S. House of Representatives. First U.S.-appointed civilian governor of Puerto Rico. Assistant Secretary of the Navy during the administration of William McKinley. Member of William North Lodge of Lowell, Massachusetts.
- Ethan Allen (1904–1993), American Major League Baseball player from 1926 to 1938. Member of Yeatman Lodge No. 162, Cincinnati, Ohio.
- Frank G. Allen (1874–1950), 51st governor of Massachusetts. Raised in Orient Lodge, Norwood, Massachusetts.
- Henry Justin Allen (1868–1950), 21st governor of Kansas (1919–1923) and U.S. senator from Kansas (1929–31)
- Ira Allen (1751 in Cornwall, Connecticut – 1814), one of the founders of Vermont, and leaders of the Green Mountain Boys. Brother of Ethan Allen. Vermont Lodge No. 1 of Charlestown, New Hampshire.
- John Allen, 3rd Viscount Allen (1713–1745), Irish peer and politician. Grandmaster of the Grand Lodge of Ireland.
- Oscar K. Allen (1882–1936), 42nd governor of Louisiana. Member of Eastern Star Lodge No. 151, Winnfield, Louisiana.
- Samuel C. Allen (1772–1842), politician and master architect
- Salvador Allende (1908–1973), President of Chile (1970–1973). Lodge Progreso No. 4, Valparaíso.
- Thomas Allibone (1903–2003), English physicist
- Roger Allin (1848–1936), fourth governor of North Dakota. Golden Valley Lodge No. 6, Park River, North Dakota.
- William B. Allison (1829–1908), early leader of the Iowa Republican Party. Member of both houses of the U.S. Congress. Charter member of Mosaic Lodge No. 125 of Dubuque. Honorary senior grand warden of the Grand Lodge of Iowa in 1889.
- James V. Allred (1899–1959), 33rd governor of Texas, later a U.S. federal judge. Raised in Bowie Lodge No. 578 in 1920.
- Edward B. Almon (1860–1933), congressman from Alabama
- J. Lindsay Almond (1898–1986), 58th governor of Virginia; federal judge
- Alfred S. Alschuler (1876–1940), prolific Chicago architect
- Richard Alsop (1761–1815), American merchant and author. Member of St. John's Lodge No. 2, Middletown, Connecticut.
- Paul Althouse (1889–1954), American opera singer. Member of St. John's Lodge No. 435, Reading, Pennsylvania.
- Carlos María de Alvear (1789–1852), Argentine soldier and statesman. Co-founder of the Lau-taro Lodge in 1812.
- Leo Amery (1873–1955), British journalist and politician
- Albert Alonzo "Doc" Ames (1842–1911), mayor of Minneapolis whose corruption was exposed by muckraking journalist Lincoln Steffens in the 1903 article "The Shame of Minneapolis". His obituary in the Minneapolis Morning Tribune described him as a 33rd degree Freemason and the Knights Templar.
- Ezra Ames (1768–1836), American portrait painter
- Oliver Ames (1831–1895), 35th governor of Massachusetts. Primary lodge membership unknown, but made honorary member of Columbian Lodge of Boston.
- William Amherst, 3rd Earl Amherst (1836–1910), British nobleman and politician
- Roald Amundsen (1872–1928), Norwegian polar explorer and discoverer of South Pole
- Abdul Rahman Andak (1859–1930), Malaysian politician
- Clinton Presba Anderson (1895–1975), congressman from New Mexico, the U.S. Secretary of Agriculture, and a U.S. senator from New Mexico. Raised in Albuquerque Lodge No. 60 in 1917.
- George T. Anderson (1824–1901), general in the Confederate States Army during the American Civil War
- Heartley "Hunk "Anderson (1898–1978), American football player and coach. Coached for Notre Dame and the Chicago Bears, among others. Calumet Lodge No. 271, Calumet, Michigan.
- Jack Z. Anderson (1904–1981), congressman from California. Raised in Texas Lodge No. 46, San Juan Bautista, California, in 1946.
- James Anderson (ca. 1679/1680–1739), Presbyterian minister best known for his influence on the early development of Freemasonry. Author of The Constitutions of the Free-Masons (1723) and The New Book of Constitutions of the Antient and Honourable Fraternity of Free and Accepted Masons (1738)
- Joseph Anderson (1757–1837), U.S. senator from Tennessee and first comptroller of the U.S. Treasury. Military Lodge No. 19 of Pennsylvania and Lodge No. 36 in the New Jersey Brigade during the American Revolution. After the war was a member of Princeton Lodge No. 38 of New Jersey.
- Robert Anderson (1805–1871), Union Army officer in the American Civil War, known for being the commander of Fort Sumter at the beginning of the war. Raised in Mercer Lodge No. 50, Trenton, New Jersey, in 1858. Honorary member of Pacific Lodge No. 233 of New York City.
- Robert B. Anderson (1910–1989), U.S. Secretary of the Navy and later Secretary of the Treasury during the Eisenhower Administration. Member of Vernon Lodge No. 655 Vernon, Texas, and was later an officer of the Grand Lodge of Texas.
- Robert H. Anderson (1835–1888), cavalry and artillery officer in the Confederate States Army during the American Civil War. Attained the rank of brigadier general. Commander of Palestine Commandery, Knights Templar No. 7 at Savannah, Georgia, in the 1880s.
- Rudolph Martin Anderson (1876–1961), Canadian zoologist and explorer
- Sigurd Anderson (1904–1990), 19th governor of South Dakota. Raised in Coteau Lodge No. 54 at Webster, South Dakota, in 1943.
- Victor Anderson (1902–1962), 28th governor of Nebraska. Raised in George Washington Lodge No. 250, Lincoln, Nebraska, in 1928.
- William F. Anderson (1860–1944), American Methodist pastor, writer, and educator who served as Bishop of Chattanooga, Cincinnati, and Boston, and as acting president of Boston University from 1 January 1925 to 15 May 1926.
- William Hamilton Anderson (1874–c. 1959), American prohibitionist
- Charles Anderson-Pelham (1749–1823), British politician, Member of Parliament (1768–1794)
- Edward Andrade (1887–1971), English physicist. Initiated into Lodge Progresso No. 4 in 1935.
- Ignacio Andrade (1839–1925), President of Venezuela from 1898 to 1899
- Gyula Andrássy (1823–1890), Hungarian statesman, Prime Minister of Hungary (1867–1871) and subsequently as Foreign Minister of Austria-Hungary (1871–1879).
- Johannes Valentinus Andreae (1586–1654), Protestant theologian, alchemist, satirical writer and early Rosicrucian. Believed to have been a Mason.
- Louis André (1838–1913), French soldier, Minister of War from 1900 until 1904
- Charles O. Andrews (1877–1946), U.S. senator from Florida, 1936 until 1946. Orlando Lodge No. 69.
- Frank Andrews (1864–1936), first Assistant Attorney General of Texas
- Robert Andrews (c. 1750–1804), chaplain of the 2nd Virginia Regiment in the Continental Army during the American Revolution. Early Grand Master of Virginia. Member of Williamsburg Lodge No. 6.
- Ivo Andrić (1892–1975), Yugoslav writer and Nobel Prize laureate
- Frank M. Angellotti (1861–1932), Chief Justice of California from 1915 to 1921. Raised in Marin Lodge No. 191, San Rafael, California, in 1886. Grand Master of California 1888–1889.
- Levi Ankeny (1844–1921), U.S. senator from the state of Washington. Became a member of Willamette Lodge No. 2 of Portland, Oregon, in 1866, affiliating with Walla Walla Lodge No. 7 in 1878, serving as master in 1881.
- Arthur Annesley, 1st Earl of Mountnorris (1744–1816), Irish peer
- George Annesley, 2nd Earl of Mountnorris (1770–1844), Irish peer
- Martin Frederick Ansel (1850–1945), 89th governor of South Carolina
- Martin C. Ansorge (1882–1967), congressman from New York. Mt. Nebo Lodge No. 257, New York City.
- Jules Anspach (1829–1879), Belgian politician
- William Anstruther-Gray, Baron Kilmany (1905–1985), British politician. Member of the Apollo University Lodge.
- Galicano Apacible (1864–1949), Filipino politician
- Apathy (1979-), stage name of underground rapper, born Chad Bromley. Wooster Lodge No. 10, Colchester, Connecticut.
- Raymond Apple (1935–), Chief Rabbi, Great Synagogue (Sydney), Australia (1972–2005)
- T. Frank Appleby (1864–1924), congressman from New Jersey
- Sir Edward Victor Appleton (1892–1965), British physicist. Nobel Prize 1947. Isaac Newton University Lodge No. 859, Cambridge.
- W. A. Appleton, British trade unionist and politician
- Matthew Arbuckle (1778–1851), career soldier in the U.S. Army closely identified with the Indian Territory
- John Arbuthnot (1667–1735), British physician and satirist
- Branch T. Archer (1790–1856), Texan Commissioner to the United States, Speaker of the House of the Republic of Texas House of Representatives, and Secretary of War of the Republic of Texas. Raised in Harmony Lodge No. 62 at Pridewell, Virginia.
- Dennis Archer (1942–), U.S. politician. Geometry Lodge #49 (Prince Hall), Detroit.
- Germán Arciniegas (1900–1999), Colombian historian and public intellectual
- Leslie C. Arends (1895–1985), congressman from Illinois
- Constantin Argetoianu (1871–1955), Prime Minister of Romania
- Richard Arlen (1899–1976), American actor of film and television. Member Utopia Lodge No. 537, Los Angeles.
- Lewis Armistead (1817–1863), Confederate general during the American Civil War. Alexandria-Washington Lodge #22, Alexandria, Virginia.
- David H. Armstrong (1812–1893), U.S. senator from Missouri. Member of Washington Lodge No. 9 of St. Louis.
- Henry W. Armstrong (1879–1951), American boxer, booking agent, producer, singer, pianist and Tin Pan Alley composer. Composed the song "Sweet Adeline". Raised in 1922 in Montgomery Lodge No. 68, New York City.
- John Armstrong Jr. (1758–1843), American soldier, delegate to the Continental Congress, U.S. senator and Secretary of War. Hibernia Lodge No. 339, New York.
- Sir Richard Armstrong (c. 1782–1854), British Army officer. Commander of the British forces in Canada West from 1842 to 1848.
- Edward F. Arn (1906–1998), 32nd governor of Kansas. Raised in Wyandotte Lodge No. 3, Kansas City, Kansas, in 1927. Member of the International Supreme Council of the Order of DeMolay. Deputy to imperial potentate of the Shrine in 1954–55.
- Ellis Arnall (1907–1992), 69th governor of the U.S. state of Georgia from 1943 to 1947. Member of Cowetta Lodge No. 60 at Newnan, Georgia.
- Thomas Arne (1710–1778), British composer of "Rule Britannia"
- Benedict Arnold (1741–1801), American general and traitor. Hiram Lodge No. 1, New Haven, Connecticut.
- Eddy Arnold (1918–2008), American country music singer. East Nashville Lodge 560 F& A.M., East Nashville, Tennessee.
- Henry H. Arnold (1886–1950), American general, only person to hold five-star rank in two branches of service. Union Lodge No. 7, KS.
- Samuel W. (Wat) Arnold (1879–1961), congressman from Missouri. Member of Adair Lodge No. 366, Kirksville, Missouri.
- William W. Arnold (1877–1957), congressman from Illinois
- J. Hugo Aronson (1891–1978), 14th governor of the U.S. state of Montana. Received degrees in Shelby Lodge No. 143 in 1924 and later demitted to Cut Bank Lodge No. 82 in Cut Bank, both in Montana. King Gustav VI Adolf q.v. of Sweden appointed him as representative of the G.L. of Sweden to the G.L. of Montana.
- François-Marie Arouet, See Voltaire
- Emin Arslan (1868–1943), Lebanese journalist and diplomat
- Harold J. Arthur (1904–1971), 68th governor of Vermont from 1950 to 1951
- Jacob Arvey (1895–1977), influential Chicago political leader from the Depression era until the mid-1950s
- Gheorghe Asachi (1788–1869), Romanian writer, poet, painter, historian, dramatist and translator
- Frank G. Ashbrook (1892–1966), American mammalogist
- William A. Ashbrook (1867–1940), congressman from Ohio
- Turner Ashby (1828–1862), Confederate cavalry commander in the American Civil War. He had achieved prominence as Thomas J. "Stonewall" Jackson's cavalry commander. Member of Equality Lodge No. 44, Martinsburg, West Virginia.
- Bowman Foster Ashe (1885–1952), U.S. educator who served as the first president of the University of Miami
- James Mitchell Ashley (1824–1896), U.S. congressman, territorial governor of Montana and railroad president. Raised in 1853 in Toledo Lodge No. 144, Toledo, Ohio.
- Anthony Ashley-Cooper, 7th Earl of Shaftesbury (1801–1885), English philanthropist and social reformer. Member of the Apollo University Lodge.
- Elias Ashmole (1617–1692), English antiquary and politician, Warrington Lodge, Lancashire
- Wayne N. Aspinall (1896–1983), congressman from Colorado. Raised in Palisade Lodge No. 125, Palisade, Colorado, in 1926.
- John Jacob Astor (1763–1848), American financier. Holland Lodge No. 8, New York, 1790.
- David Rice Atchison (1807–1886), U.S. senator from Missouri. Known for the claim that for one day (4 March 1849) he may have been Acting President of the United States. Member of Platte Lodge No. 56, Platte City, Missouri.
- H. H. Atherton (1833–1904), state senator from Minnesota.
- John Murray, 3rd Duke of Atholl (1729–1774), Scottish peer and Tory politician. Succeeded his father as Grand Master of Grand Lodge of England in 1775, serving until 1781 and again from 1791 to 1813. Was Grand Master of Grand Lodge of Scotland from 1778 to 1779.
- John Murray, 4th Duke of Atholl, Scottish politician. Grand Master of Scotland (1778–1780).
- George Murray, 6th Duke of Atholl (1814–1864), Scottish peer. Served as 66th Grand Master Mason of Scotland 1843–1863. Grand Master of England from 1843 until his death in January 1864.
- John Stewart-Murray, 8th Duke of Atholl (1871–1942), Scottish soldier and Conservative politician. Served as 79th Grand Master Mason of Scotland 1909–1913.
- Smith D. Atkins (1836–1913), American newspaper editor, lawyer, and a Union Army colonel during the American Civil War
- Arthur K. Atkinson (1891–?), president of the Wabash Railroad in the mid-20th century. Member of University City Lodge No. 649, Missouri.
- George W. Atkinson (1845–1925), tenth governor of West Virginia. Raised in Kanawha Lodge No. 20, Charleston, West Virginia, 12 October 1866. Grand master of West Virginia in 1876 and Grand Secretary of the Grand Lodge of West Virginia from 1897 to 1901.
- William Yates Atkinson (1854–1899), 55th governor of Georgia
- William Wallace Atterbury (1866–1935), tenth president of the Pennsylvania Railroad. American brigadier general during World War I and built the American Army railroads in France during the war. Raised in Colonial Lodge No. 631, Philadelphia, in 1895.
- John James Audubon (1785–1851), American ornithologist and artist
- Arnold Jacob "Red" Auerbach (1917–2006), American basketball coach
- John Auldjo (1805–1886), British explorer, alpinist, engraver and author
- Henry Aurand (1894–1980), career U.S. Army officer who served in World War I, World War II and the Korean War. Member of Shamokin Lodge No. 255, Shamokin, Pennsylvania.
- Moses Austin (1761–1821), secured a grant of 200,000 acres in the province of Texas (under New Spain) on 17 January 1821, but died on his return trip to home in Missouri. His son Stephen F. Austin carried out the colonization of Texas.
- Stephen F. Austin (1793–1836), Secretary of State for the Republic of Texas. Louisiana Lodge No. 109, Missouri.
- Warren Austin (1877–1962), American politician and statesman; among other roles, he served as senator from Vermont and U.S. Ambassador to the United Nations. Raised in Brattleboro Lodge No. 102 at Burlington, Vermont.
- Gene Autry (1907–1998), movie and television star. Catoosa Lodge No. 185, Oklahoma.
- William H. Avery (1911–2009), 37th governor of Kansas. Received degrees in Wakefield Lodge No. 396, Wakefield, Kansas.
- Samuel Beach Axtell (1819–1891), notable for being the most controversial Chief Justice of the New Mexico Territorial Supreme Court; corrupted administration as governor of New Mexico; brief tenure as governor of Utah; and two-term congressman from California. Member of Amador Lodge No. 65, Jackson, California.
- Charles Brantley Aycock (1859–1912), 50th governor of North Carolina. He served as grand orator of the Grand Lodge of North Carolina in 1897.
- William Augustus Ayres (1867–1952), member of the U.S. House of Representatives from Kansas
- Allen Bristol Aylesworth (1854–1952), Canadian politician. Member of Ionic Lodge No. 25 in Toronto.
- William Edmondstoune Aytoun (1813–1865), Scottish lawyer and poet. Active member of the Scottish Grand Lodge and representative there of the Grand Lodge Royal York of Germany.
- Miguel de Azcuénaga (1754–1833), Argentine patriot
- Abdul Qadir Al Jaza'iri, Sufi mystic, scholar and political leader. Brought Freemasonry into Grand Syria. Took oath on 18 June 1867, at a specially convened meeting of the Lodge of the Pyramids, Alexandria, Egypt. He is considered one of the most famous Arab Muslim freemasons.

== B ==
- Amadou Hampâté Bâ (1901–1991), Malian writer and ethnologist
- Frederick H. Babbitt (1859–1931), American politician, president Vermont State Senate 1912–13
- Johann Christian Bach (1735–1782), European composer. Lodge of Nine Muses No. 235, London.
- Nahum J. Bachelder (1854–1934), 49th governor of New Hampshire
- Irving Bacheller (1859–1950), American journalist and writer. Raised 5 December 1899 in Kane Lodge No. 454, New York.
- Augustus Octavius Bacon (1839–1914), U.S. senator from Georgia
- Robert L. Bacon (1884–1938), American banker, lieutenant colonel, and congressman from New York
- Walter W. Bacon (1880–1962), 60th governor of Delaware. Member of St. John's Lodge No. 2, New Castle, Delaware, being raised 2 July 1902. Grand Master of the Grand Lodge of Delaware in 1915.
- Robert Baddeley (1733–1794), English actor of the Drury Lane Theatre in London. Member of St. Alban's Lodge No. 29, London.
- Michael Baden-Powell, 4th Baron Baden-Powell (1940–2023), grandson of Robert Baden-Powell, the founder of the Scout Movement. State Commissioner for Special Duties, Scouts Australia, Victoria Branch. Lodge Baden-Powell No 488, Victoria, Australia.
- Arthur P. Bagby (1794–1858), tenth governor of Alabama. Served as grand orator of the Grand Lodge of Alabama.
- John J. Bagley (1832–1881), 16th governor of Michigan. Member of Charity Lodge No. 94, Detroit, Michigan.
- Karl Friedrich Bahrdt (1741–1792), German theologian and adventurer. Freemason, who with other Freemasons founded the "German Union" or the "Two and Twenty" society at Halle.
- Michael Baigent (1948–2013), British author and former editor of Freemasonry Today. Lodge of Economy No 76, Winchester.
- Carl Edward Bailey (1894–1948), 31st governor of Arkansas. Received 32° at Little Rock, 25 May 1928.
- James E. Bailey (1822–1885), U.S. senator from Tennessee. Member of Clarksville Lodge No. 89, Clarksville, Tennessee.
- John O. Bailey (1880–1959), American judge and politician in the state of Oregon. He was 27th Chief Justice of the Oregon Supreme Court. Raised in Doric Lodge No. 132, Portland, Oregon, about 1920.
- Joseph Bailey, 1st Baron Glanusk, Welsh politician and member of the Apollo University Lodge
- Leonard C. Bailey, African American businessman and inventor
- Nat Bailey (1902–1978), American-born Canadian restaurateur, founder of White Spot. Mount Lebanon Lodge No. 72, Vancouver.
- Theodorus Bailey (1805–1877), United States Navy officer during the American Civil War. Raised in Washington Lodge No. 21, New York City, on 3 March 1829.
- Thomas L. Bailey (1888–1946), 48th governor of Mississippi
- Edward Hodges Baily (1788–1867), English sculptor
- John Baird, 1st Viscount Stonehaven (1874–1941), British politician, Member of Parliament (1910–1925), Governor-General of Australia (1925–1931). Grand Master of New South Wales (1928–1930).
- Bryant Baker (1881–1970), British-born American sculptor. Sculpted the 17 foot bronze of George Washington at the Washington Masonic National Memorial in Alexandria, Virginia. Member of Constitutional Lodge No. 294 at Beverley, Yorkshire, England.
- Howard Baker Sr. (1902–1964), congressman from Tennessee
- James Marion Baker (1861–1940), American political figure; held the position of Secretary of the U.S. Senate from 1913 to 1919
- Jonathan Baker, British Anglican Bishop of Fulham, initiated into the Apollo University Lodge
- Josephine Baker (1906–1975), American-born French dancer, singer, resistance member and actress, initiated in the Grande Loge De Feminine of France 1960
- Nathaniel B. Baker (1818–1876), 24th governor of New Hampshire. A member of Western Star Lodge No. 100, Clinton, Iowa.
- Phil Baker (1896–1963), American comedian and emcee on radio. Also a vaudeville actor, composer, songwriter, accordionist and author. Raised in Keystone Lodge No. 235, New York City.
- Samuel Aaron Baker (1874–1933), 36th governor of Missouri. Member of Jefferson Lodge No. 43, Jefferson City, Missouri.
- Simmons Jones Baker (1775–1853), U.S. physician, planter, and legislator. Grand Master of Masons of North Carolina in 1832 and again in 1840. Laid the cornerstone of the state capitol building in Raleigh, North Carolina, on 4 July 1833.
- Simon Strousse Baker (1866–1932), sixth president of Washington & Jefferson College
- Walter Ransom Gail Baker (1892–1960), American electrical engineer. Founded the National Television System Committee, or NTSC, in 1940.
- Mikhail Bakunin (1814–1876), Russian revolutionary. Lodge Il Progresso Sociale, Florence, 1864
- Antonio González de Balcarce (1774–1819), Argentine military commander in the early 19th century
- Nicolae Bălcescu (1819–1852), Romanian historian, journalist and 1848 revolutionary
- Bernt Balchen (1899–1973), pioneer polar aviator, navigator, aircraft mechanical engineer and military leader. Member of Norseman Lodge No. 878 of Brooklyn, New York. With Admiral Byrd they dropped Masonic flags over the two poles, and dropped his Kismet Temple Shrine fez over the South Pole.
- H. C. Baldridge (1868–1947), 14th governor of Idaho. Raised in Parma Lodge No. 49, Parma, Idaho, in 1923.
- Henry Baldwin (1780–1844), Associate Justice of the Supreme Court of the United States. Master of Lodge No. 45 in Pittsburgh in 1805.
- Mark Baldwin (1863–1929), pitcher in Major League Baseball.
- Harold Ballard (1903–1990), National Hockey League team owner (Toronto Maple Leafs). Corinthian No. 481, GRC, Toronto.
- Hosea Ballou (1771–1852), American Universalist clergyman and theological writer. Member of Warren Lodge No. 23 at Woodstock, Vermont, and served as master in 1807.
- Robert C. Baltzell (1879–1950), U.S. federal judge
- Charles-Louis Balzac (1752–1820), French architect and sometime poet. Founded the Lodge of the Great Sphinx at Paris.
- Fred B. Balzar (1880–1934), 15th governor of Nevada. Raised 28 August 1908 in Inyo Lodge No. 221 at Independence, California, and later affiliated with Carson Lodge No. 1, Carson City, Nevada.
- Simon Bamberger (1846–1926), fourth governor of Utah
- Roger Bambuck (b. 1945), French Olympic sprinter and politician
- Augustus Bampfylde, 2nd Baron Poltimore (1837–1908), British politician, member of the Apollo University Lodge
- Harry Hill Bandholtz (1864–1925), U.S. Army major general during World War I. Known for preventing Romanian soldiers from removing Transylvanian treasures from the National Museum of Hungary in Budapest during the Romanian occupation of the city in 1919.
- John H. Bankhead (1842–1920), U.S. senator from Alabama between 1907 and 1920. Confederate officer during the American Civil War. Grand master of Grand Lodge of Alabama in 1883–1884.
- Joseph Banks (1743–1820), English botanist. Inverness Lodge, No. 4367.
- Nathaniel P. Banks (1816–1894), 24th governor of Massachusetts, Speaker of the U.S. House of Representatives and Union general during the American Civil War. Member of Monitor Lodge, Waltham, Massachusetts.
- William V. Banks, founder of the first black-owned and black-operated television station in the United States
- Parke M. Banta (1891–1970), congressman from Missouri. Raised in Potosi Lodge No. 131 at Potosi, Missouri, about 1916, served as master in 1923.
- Leedham Bantock (1870–1928), actor, dramatist and early film director
- Orion M. Barber (1857–1930), Vermont state politician and a judge of the U.S. Court of Customs and Patent Appeals
- Clarence Barbour (1867–1937), Baptist clergyman and educator most notable for having served as the president of Brown University. Served as Grand Chaplain of the Grand Lodges of both New York and Rhode Island.
- James Barbour (1775–1842), 18th governor of Virginia, a U.S. senator from 1814 to 1825, and the U.S. Secretary of War from 1825 to 1828. Member of Stephensburg Lodge No. 40, Stevensburg, Virginia.
- McClelland Barclay (1891–1942), American painter of pin-up art and war propaganda posters
- Malcolm Barclay-Harvey (1890–1969), British politician and colonial administrator, Member of Parliament (1923–1929, 1931–1939). Grand Master of Scotland (1949–1953).
- Guy K. Bard (1895–1953), Pennsylvania educator; later became a judge of the U.S. District Court for the Eastern District of Pennsylvania
- Samuel Bard (1742–1821), American physician who founded the first medical school in New York. Personal physician to George Washington. Member of Union Lodge, New York.
- Thomas R. Bard (1841–1915), U.S. senator from California. Member of Hueneme Lodge No. 311, California.
- Graham Arthur Barden (1896–1967), congressman from North Carolina
- Clinton L. Bardo (1868–1937), American industrialist whose career included stints as general manager of the New York, New Haven and Hartford Railroad and president of the New York Shipbuilding Corporation.
- Evelyn Baring, 1st Baron Howick of Glendale (1903–1973), British colonial administrator and member of the Apollo University Lodge
- John Baring, 7th Baron Ashburton (1928–2020), British merchant banker and member of the Apollo University Lodge
- Walter S. Baring Jr. (1911–1975), congressman from Nevada. Raised in May 1941, Reno Lodge No. 13.
- William J. Barker (1886–1968), U.S. federal judge
- Elmer E. Barlow (1887–1948), American jurist from Wisconsin
- Joel Barlow (1754–1812), American poet, diplomat, and politician. Member of St. Johns Lodge No 4., Hartford, Connecticut.
- Francis Stillman Barnard (1856–1936), Canadian politician and Lieutenant Governor of British Columbia. Raised: Victoria Columbia No. 1. 17 April 1887.
- Isaac D. Barnard (1791–1834), U.S. senator from Pennsylvania
- Thomas John Barnardo (1845–1905), British philanthropist
- Cassius McDonald Barnes, American Civil War soldier, lawyer and politician who served as the fourth governor of Oklahoma Territory. Master of Guthrie Lodge No. 35, Guthrie, Oklahoma, in 1902.
- Henry Barnes, 2nd Baron Gorell (1882–1917), British soldier and member of the Apollo University Lodge
- James M. Barnes (1899–1958), congressman from Illinois. Member of Jacksonville Lodge No. 570, Jacksonville, Illinois.
- Will C. Barnes (1858–1936), American author, rancher, and state legislator in Arizona and New Mexico. Received the Medal of Honor for bravery at the Battle of Fort Apache.
- Joshua Barney (1759–1818), American naval officer. Served in the Continental Navy during the Revolutionary War and would later achieve the rank of commodore in the U.S. Navy. Also served in the War of 1812. He was made a Freemason in the Lodge of the Nine Sisters, Paris, France, in 1799 (although other sources state that he was raised in Lodge No. 3, Philadelphia, Pa. on 17 May 1777, and still another lists him as a member of No. 3 on 1 May 1777). He was a visitor of Lodge No. 2, Philadelphia on 16 June 1780.
- Maurice Victor Barnhill (1887–1963), Associate Justice (1937–1954) and Chief Justice (1954–1956) of the North Carolina Supreme Court
- Simion Bărnuţiu (1808–1864), Romanian philosopher and politician
- Henry A. Barnum (1833–1892), Union Army officer during the American Civil War and a recipient of the Medal of Honor. Member of Syracuse Lodge No. 102, Syracuse, New York.
- William Henry Barnum (1818–1889), U.S. senator from Connecticut. Member of Montgomery Lodge No. 13 at Lakeville, Connecticut.
- Diego Martínez Barrio (1883–1962), Prime Minister of Spain and founder of the Republican Union
- Samuel Barrett (1879–1965), American anthropologist and linguist who studied Native American peoples
- Lewis O. Barrows (1893–1967), 57th governor of Maine
- John Barry (1745–1803), officer in the Continental Navy during the American Revolutionary War and later in the U.S. Navy. Initiated in Lodge No. 2, Philadelphia, on 12 October 1795. Suspended for non-payment of dues in 1800.
- William T. Barry (1784–1835), U.S. Postmaster General during the Jackson Administration. U.S. senator from Kentucky. Member of Lexington Lodge No. 1 and later of Davies Lodge No. 22 of Lexington. Was elected an honorary member of Federal Lodge No. 1, Washington, D.C., on 4 January 1830.
- John L. Barstow (1832–1913), 39th governor of Vermont
- Bobby Barth (b. 1952), American singer, songwriter, record producer and guitarist. Member of Denver Lodge No. 5.
- Frédéric Auguste Bartholdi (1834–1904), sculptor of New York's Statue of Liberty. Lodge Alsace-Lorraine, Paris.
- Harold Roe Bartle (1901–1974), American businessman, philanthropist, Boy Scout executive, and professional public speaker. Served two terms as mayor of Kansas City, Missouri. Member of Lebanon Lodge No. 87 in Kentucky plus the Ararat Shriners of Kansas City, Missouri.
- John H. Bartlett (1869–1952), 57th governor of New Hampshire
- Josiah Bartlett (1729–1795), American physician and statesman, delegate to the Continental Congress for New Hampshire and signatory of the Declaration of Independence. He was later Chief Justice of the New Hampshire Superior Court of Judicature and governor of the state. Although his lodge is not known, his great-grandson, Levi S. Bartlett, had a letter written by Josiah to his son Ezra saying, "I attended a Mason meeting last night, and as soon as you can I wish you would join the Masons."
- Robert Bartlett (1875–1946), Canadian navigator and Arctic explorer of the late 19th and early 20th centuries
- Francesco Bartolozzi (1725–1815), Italian engraver. Was an early member of the Lodge of Nine Muses No. 235, London. The frontispiece of the 1784 edition of the Book of Constitutions is his engraving.
- Edmund Barton (1849–1920), first prime minister of the Commonwealth of Australia, Speaker of the legislative assembly. Initiated: Australian Lodge of Harmony No. 556 English Constitution in Sydney on 13 March 1878.
- William Barton (1748–1831), officer in the Continental Army during the American War of Independence who retired with the rank of colonel. Became a member of St. John's Lodge, Providence, Rhode Island, in 1779.
- William "Count" Basie (1904–1984), jazz orchestra leader and composer. Wisdom Lodge No. 102 (Prince Hall), Chicago.
- Charles Baskerville (1870–1922), American chemist
- Edward Bass (1726–1803), first American Episcopal bishop of the Diocese of Massachusetts and second bishop of the Diocese of Rhode Island. Admitted as a member of St. John's Lodge No. 1 of Portsmouth, New Hampshire, on 12 April 1758. Served as grand chaplain of the Grand Lodge of Massachusetts in 1768.
- Perkins Bass (1912–2011), four-term congressman from New Hampshire. Member of Altemont Lodge No. 26, Peterborough, New Hampshire.
- Francis Basset, 1st Baron de Dunstanville (1757–1835), English politician
- Richard Napoleon Batchelder (1832–1901), 18th Quartermaster General of the United States Army. Awarded the Medal of Honor in 1891. Member of Lafayette Lodge No. 41 at Manchester, New Hampshire.
- William B. Bate (1826–1905), American soldier and politician. Governor of Tennessee from 1883 to 1887, and U.S. senator from 1887 until his death. Major general in the Confederate Army during the American Civil War. Member of King Solomon Lodge No. 94, Gallatin, Tennessee.
- Edward Bates (1793–1869), American lawyer and statesman. First Attorney General of Missouri after it was admitted as a state. U.S. Attorney General under Lincoln from 1861 to 1864. Was a member of Missouri Lodge No. 12, under Tennessee charter (later Missouri No. 1). Was active in the formation of the Grand Lodge of Missouri. Served four terms as grand master, 1825, 1826, 1827, & 1831.
- Frederick Bates (1777–1825), governor of Missouri
- Isaac C. Bates (1779–1845), American politician from Massachusetts serving in both houses of the U.S. Congress. Member of Jerusalem Lodge, Northampton, Massachusetts.
- John L. Bates (1859–1946), 41st governor of Massachusetts. Member, Baalbec Lodge, Boston.
- Joe B. Bates (1893–1965), congressman from Kentucky
- Thomas Bates), British surgeon
- Thomas Bath (1875–1956), Australian politician, former Western Australian Leader of the Opposition. Involved in founding of Lodge Bonnie Doon, 839, S.C.
- Charles Bathurst (1867–1958), Governor-General of New Zealand, Grand Master of the Grand Lodge of New Zealand, initiated in Apollo University Lodge
- William Battine (1765–1836), English poet
- John S. Battle (1890–1972), 56th governor of Virginia. Member of Charlottesville Lodge No. 5, Charlottesville, Virginia.
- Laurie C. Battle (1912–2000), congressman from Alabama. Member of Docena Lodge No. 815, Docena, Alabama, as well as the Zamora Shriners and Order of the Eastern Star Chapter 118 in Birmingham.
- Warner Baxter (1889–1951), American film actor of the silent and early talkie period. Second person to win the Academy Award for Best Actor. Member Cahuenga Lodge No. 513, Hollywood, California.
- Birch Bayh (1928–2019), U.S. senator from Indiana from 1962 to 1981
- Francis Baylies (1783–1852), congressman from Massachusetts. Original lodge not known, but made honorary member of Mount Lebanon Lodge, Boston, on 26 January 1835.
- William Wither Bramston Beach (1826–1901), British politician and railway entrepreneur. Apollo University Lodge No 357, Oxford, and multiple other lodges. Third Grand Principal, Supreme Grand Chapter of England (Royal Arch).
- Sir Michael Hicks Beach, 8th Baronet (1809–1854), British politician, initiated in the Apollo University Lodge
- Michael Hicks Beach, 1st Earl St Aldwyn (1837–1916), British politician and Chancellor of the Exchequer, member of the Apollo University Lodge
- Jeremy Beadle MBE (1948–2008), English television presenter, radio presenter, writer, and producer. Westminster City Council Lodge No 2882 (London).
- George Lafayette Beal (1825–1896), American politician from Maine who served in the federal forces during the American Civil War. Member of Oxford Lodge No. 18, Norway, Maine.
- John Beale (1608–1683), English gardener and writer
- John V. Beamer (1896–1964), congressman from Indiana. Member of Hanna Lodge No. 61, Wabash, Indiana.
- Henry J. Bean (1853–1941), American politician and judge in Oregon. 24th Chief Justice of the Oregon Supreme Court.
- Daniel Carter Beard (1850–1941), founder of the Boy Scouts. Initiated in Mariner's Lodge No. 67, New York City, and later affiliated with Cornucopia Lodge 563, Flushing, New York.
- William S. Beardsley (1901–1954), 31st governor of Iowa
- John Beatty (1749–1826), American physician and statesman. An officer of the Continental Army, he was appointed Commissary General for Prisoners with the rank of colonel. Was a member of the Continental Congress in 1784 and 1785. Was a member of the U.S. House of Representatives from New Jersey during the Third Congress. Raised in Trenton Lodge No. 5, Trenton, New Jersey. A past master of that lodge, he was elected Grand Master of the Grand Lodge of New Jersey in 1791. In 1792 he transferred his membership to Solomon's Lodge No. 1.
- Charles Beauclerk, 1st Duke of St Albans (1670–726), illegitimate son of King Charles II and Nell Gwynne
- Henry Somerset, 5th Duke of Beaufort (1744–1803), Grand Master of Grand Lodge of England, 1767–71
- Honoré Beaugrand (1848–1906), politician, journalist, Fall River Lodge 1873; assisted in founding Montreal Emancipation Lodge in 1897
- Eugène de Beauharnais (1781–1824), Viceroy of Italy under Napoleon
- Charles Geneviève Louis Auguste André Timothée d'Éon de Beaumont (1728–1810), French soldier, diplomat and spy. Raised: January, 1769, Lodge of Immortality No. 376, London.
- Campbell E. Beaumont (1883–1954), U.S. federal judge from Kentucky
- Jean-Baptiste-Jacques Élie de Beaumont, French lawyer
- Tim Beaumont (1928–2008), British politician
- William Beaumont (1785–1853), surgeon in the U.S. Army who became known as the "Father of Gastric Physiology" following his research on human digestion. Raised in Harmony Lodge, Champlain, New York, 11 April 1820.
- P. G. T. Beauregard (1818–1893), American military officer, politician, inventor, writer, civil servant, and the first prominent general of the Confederate States Army during the American Civil War
- Charles Bebb (1856–1942), British-American architect who designed the Washington State Capitol building
- Stephen David Bechtel Sr. (1900–1989), founder of the Bechtel Corporation and the president of the company from 1933 through 1960. Raised 30 June 1923 in Oakland Lodge No. 188, Oakland, California.
- Theodric Romeyn Beck (1791–1855), American physician in New York specializing in medical jurisprudence who authored the first significant American book on forensic medicine, Elements of Medical Jurisprudence, in 1823. Member of Masters Lodge No. 5, Albany, New York.
- William Becket (1684–1738), English surgeon and antiquary
- Rudolph Zacharias Becker (1752–1822), German educator and author, and active Freemason of Gotha. Published an historical essay in 1786 on the Bavarian Illuminati titled Grundsätze, Verfassung und Schicksale des Illuminates Order in Baiern.
- J. C. W. Beckham (1869–1940), 35th governor of Kentucky. Member of Duvall Lodge No. 6, Bardstown, Kentucky.
- John J. Beckley (1757–1807), first Librarian of Congress as well as first and fourth Clerk of the U.S. House of Representatives. Member of Williamsburg Lodge No. 6, Williamsburg, Virginia.
- Johann Beckmann (1739–1811), German scientific author and coiner of the word "technology", to mean the science of trades. He was the first man to teach technology and write about it as an academic subject.
- Thomas Taylour, Earl of Bective, Grand Sovereign of the Red Cross of Constantine, 1886
- Gunning Bedford Jr. (1747–1812), signer of the U.S. Constitution; first Grand Master of Masons in Delaware
- William Kirkpatrick Riland Bedford, British clergyman and antiquary, member of Apollo University Lodge
- Joseph D. Bedle (1821–1894), 23rd governor of New Jersey. Raised in Olive Branch Lodge No. 16, Freehold, New Jersey, on 24 April 1857.
- Hamilton P. Bee (1822–1897), American politician in early Texas who served one term as Speaker of the Texas House of Representatives and later was a Confederate States Army general during the American Civil War. Member of Austin Lodge No. 12, Texas.
- Robert Livingston Beeckman (1866–1935), 52nd governor of Rhode Island
- Carroll L. Beedy (1880–1947), congressman from Maine from 1921 to 1935
- Wallace Beery (1885–1949), American actor. Won the Academy Award for Best Actor for the 1931 film The Champ. Member of Blaney Lodge No. 271 of Chicago, Illinois.
- Ludwig van Beethoven (1770–1827), composer. Though no records exist, several of Beethoven's biographers state that he was a Freemason based on other evidence.
- Lyall T. Beggs (1899–1973), Wisconsin lawyer and politician. Past commander in chief of the Veterans of Foreign Wars and a member of the Wisconsin State Assembly.
- Josiah Begole (1815–1896), congressman and the 19th governor of Michigan. Member of Flint Lodge No. 23, Flint, Michigan.
- Robert S. Beightler (1892–1978), U.S. Army major general and Ohio political insider
- Jonathan Belcher (1681/2–1757), merchant, businessman, and politician from the Province of Massachusetts Bay during the American colonial period. Served simultaneously for over a decade as colonial governor of the British colonies of New Hampshire (1729–1741) and Massachusetts (1730–1741) and later for ten years as governor of New Jersey (1747–1757). Raised in an old "Guilde Lodge" in England in 1704–13 years before the founding of the G.L. of England. Reported as having been on the rolls of the craft in Nova Scotia at an early date. Was affiliated with St. John's Lodge in Boston.
- Manuel Belgrano (1770–1820), Argentine economist, lawyer, politician, and military leader. He took part in the Argentine War of Independence and created the flag of Argentina. He is regarded as one of the main Libertadores of the country.
- Elliott Belgrave (1931– ) GCMG, KA, CHB, QC, Governor-General of Barbados, Past District Grand Master of the District Grand Lodge of Barbados (Scottish Constitution)
- Irwin Belk (1922–2018), CEO of Belk, a national department store chain. Under his leadership, Belk Inc. became the largest, privately owned department store chain in the United States. Belk served in the North Carolina House of Representatives from 1959 to 1962 and the North Carolina Senate from 1963 to 1966. In 1999, President Bill Clinton appointed Belk as an alternative delegate to the United Nations. Belk was a member and retired elder of Myers Park Presbyterian Church. He was Raised to the Degree of Master Mason on (4 February 1944) at Phalanx Lodge No. 31 Charlotte, North Carolina.
- John Montgomery Belk (1920–2007), head of the Belk department store chain and mayor of Charlotte, North Carolina, for four terms (1969–1977). Petitioned (21 January 1946), Initiated (4 March 1946), Passed (15 April 1946) and Raised (12 August 1946) all in Excelsior Lodge No. 261 of Charlotte.
- Andrew Bell (1726–1809), Scottish printer, founder of the Encyclopædia Britannica
- Charles J. Bell (1858–1929), Scotch-Irish American businessman. He was a cousin of Alexander Graham Bell and as such was an early executive of Bell Telephone. Co-founder of the National Geographic Society, and was its first treasurer.
- Charles S. Bell (1880–1965), lawyer and jurist from Cincinnati. Associate Justice of the Supreme Court of Ohio 1942–1947.
- Francis Bell (1851–1936), Prime Minister of New Zealand
- Frank Bell (1840–1927), sixth governor of Nevada. Member of Reno Lodge No. 13, and served as Grand Master of the Grand Lodge of Nevada.
- John Bell (New Hampshire) (1765–1836), governor of New Hampshire for one year (1828 to 1829). Member of St. John's Lodge No. 1, Portsmouth, New Hampshire.
- John Bell (Tennessee) (1796–1869), Tennessee politician. Served in the U.S. House of Representatives from 1827 to 1841, and in the U.S. Senate from 1847 to 1859. Speaker of the House for the 23rd Congress (1834–1835), and briefly served as Secretary of War during the administration of William Henry Harrison (1841). In 1860, he ran for president as the candidate for the Constitutional Union Party. Member of King Solomon Lodge No. 6 at Gallatin, Tennessee.
- Lawrence Dale Bell (1894–1956), founder of Bell Aircraft Corporation
- James Bellak (1813–1891), musician and instrument manufacturer
- Francis Bellamy (1855–1931), author of the U.S. Pledge of Allegiance. Member of Little Falls Lodge No. 181, Little Falls, New York.
- Johann Joachim Bellermann (1754–1842), German Hebraist and professor of theology at Berlin University
- Sir Henry Bellingham, 4th Baronet (1846–1921), Anglo-Irish politician. Member of Apollo University Lodge.
- Harry H. Belt, American educator, lawyer, and judge in the state of Oregon. 28th Chief Justice of the Oregon Supreme Court.
- Giovanni Battista Belzoni (1778–1823), also known as The Great Belzoni, a prolific Italian explorer and pioneer archaeologist of Egyptian antiquities
- Charles Albert "Chief" Bender (1884–1954), Major League Baseball pitcher during the first two decades of the 20th century. Elected to the Baseball Hall of Fame in 1953. Petitioned Robert A. Lamberton Lodge No. 487 of Philadelphia when 27 years of age and was raised on 4 April 1911. He was suspended for non-payment of dues in 1938, but reinstated in 1943.
- Edvard Beneš (1884–1948), President of Czechoslovakia (1935–39, 1945–48). Ian Amos Komensky Lodge No. 1, Prague.
- Conrado Benitez (1889–1971), Philippine statesman. Helped write the Philippine constitution. Grand Master of the Philippines.
- Alexander von Benckendorff (1781 or 1783–1844), Russian cavalry general and statesman. Member of the Lodge of United Friends in St. Petersburg.
- Augustus W. Bennet (1897–1983), congressman from New York. Member of Hudson River Lodge No. 607, Newburgh, New York, serving as master in 1930.
- Henry Grey Bennet (1777–1836), English politician
- William Stiles Bennet (1870–1962), congressman from New York
- Caleb P. Bennett (1758–1836), American soldier and politician from Delaware. He was a veteran of the American Revolution and the War of 1812, and served as governor of Delaware. Raised in Lodge No. 14 at Christina Ferry, Delaware, on 16 January 1781.
- Charles Edward Bennett (1910–2003), congressman from Florida from 1949 to 1993. Member of Riverside Lodge No. 266, Jacksonville, Florida.
- Henry G. Bennett (1886–951), prominent educational figure from Oklahoma. Served as the president of Southeastern Oklahoma State University and Oklahoma State University. He was appointed by Harry S. Truman as an Assistant Secretary of State.
- R. B. Bennett (1870–1947), Prime Minister of Canada 1930–1935
- Thomas Bennett Jr. (1781–1865), 48th governor of South Carolina. Member of Solomons Lodge No. 1, Charleston.
- Henry Arthur Benning (1879–1962), vice-president and general manager of the Amalgamated Sugar Company
- Camillo Benso, Count of Cavour (1810–1861), Italian politician
- Carville Benson (1872–1929), congressman from Maryland
- Elmer Austin Benson (1895–1985), 24th governor of Minnesota. Raised in Appleton Lodge No. 137, Appleton, Minnesota, on 3 January 1917.
- William Benswanger (1892–1972), president and chief executive of the Pittsburgh Pirates Major League Baseball franchise 1932 through 1946. Member of Lodge No. 45 of Pittsburgh.
- Charles Bent (1799–1847), first civilian governor of the New Mexico Territory in September 1846
- Alvin Morell Bentley (1918–1969), congressman from Michigan. One of the victims of the 1954 U.S. Capitol shootings. Member of Owosso Lodge No. 81, Owosso, Michigan.
- William Plummer Benton (1828–1867), American lawyer and soldier who served in both the Mexican–American War and the American Civil War. Member of Webb Lodge No. 24 at Richmond, Indiana.
- Lloyd Bentsen (1921–2006), U.S. senator from Texas, nominee (Democratic Party) for vice president in 1988
- Henry Beresford, 3rd Marquess of Waterford (1811–1859), Irish aristocrat and member of the Apollo University Lodge
- Victor L. Berger (1860–1929), founding member of the Social Democratic Party of America. Congressman. Raised in Aurora Lodge No. 30, Milwaukee, on 26 February 1889.
- George Bergstrom (1876–1955), American architect of Norwegian heritage noted for his design work on the Pentagon
- Randolph C. Berkeley (1875–1960), U.S. Marine Corps major general who received the Medal of Honor for his actions during the U.S. occupation of Veracruz
- Irving Berlin (1888–1989), composer. Munn Lodge No. 190, New York.
- Silvio Berlusconi (1936–2023), Italian media tycoon and politician, Prime Minister of Italy. Initiated in Lodge Propaganda Due; expelled in 1981 (some say 1976) by the Grand Orient of Italy.
- Remigio Morales Bermúdez (1836–1894), President of Peru from 1890 to 1894
- Alain Bernheim (1931–2022), musician and Masonic researcher. Loge Les Amis Discrets n° 26, Grand Lodge Alpina of Switzerland.
- Ben Bernie (1891–1943), American jazz violinist and radio personality
- Arnaud Berquin (1747–1791), French children's author
- George L. Berry (1882–1948), U.S. senator from Tennessee from 1937 to 1938. One of the founders of the American Legion.
- Hiram Gregory Berry (1824–1863), American politician and general in the Army of the Potomac during the American Civil War. Member of Aurora Lodge No. 50, Rockland, Maine.
- Seymour Berry, 2nd Viscount Camrose (1909–1995), British newspaperman and member of the Apollo University Lodge
- Ted Berry (1905–2000), American politician; first African American mayor of Cincinnati, Ohio
- Tom Berry (1879–1951), 14th governor of South Dakota
- Clifford K. Berryman (1869–1949), Pulitzer Prize-winning cartoonist with the Washington Star newspaper from 1907 to 1949. Also a cartoonist for The Washington Post from 1891 to 1907. Member of Temple Noyes Lodge No. 32 of Washington, D.C.
- Paul Bert (1833–1886), French zoologist, physiologist and politician
- Francisco Bertrand (1866–1926), twice president of Honduras
- Jöns Jacob Berzelius (1779–1848), Swedish chemist. Initiated in 1805 in St. John's Lodge St. Erik, at Stockholm.
- Walter Besant (1836–1901), novelist and historian. Raised in Mauritius Lodge in 1862 and became master of Marquis of Dalhousie Lodge No. 1159, London, in 1873. Conceived the idea of establishing a lodge of research and as a result became one of the founders of the famous Quatuor Coronati Lodge No. 2076 of London, serving as its treasurer at one time.
- William Thomas Best (1826–1897), English organist
- Ramón Emeterio Betances (1827–1898), Puerto Rican politician and statesman. Logia Unión Germana, San Germán, Puerto Rico.
- Jackson Edward Betts (1904–1993), congressman from Ohio. Raised in Findlay Lodge No. 227, Findlay, Ohio, in 1931.
- Albert J. Beveridge (1862–1927), American historian and U.S. senator from Indiana. Member of Oriental Lodge No. 500, Indianapolis.
- James R. Beverley (1894–1967), U.S. lawyer and Attorney General of Puerto Rico. While serving as Attorney General, also served twice as acting governor of Puerto Rico.
- Howard Landis Bevis (1885–1968), seventh president of Ohio State University. Raised in McMakin Lodge No. 120, Mt. Healthy, Ohio, in 1911 and served as master of same in 1916.
- George M. Bibb (1776–1859), 17th U.S. Secretary of the Treasury and two-term member of the U.S. Senate. Was the first master of Russellville Lodge No. 17, Russellville, Kentucky, and was master of Hiram Lodge No. 4, Frankfort, Kentucky. He was also past master of Lexington Lodge No. 1 at Lexington, and served as secretary in 1804. In 1804 he was grand master of Kentucky.
- Thomas Bibb (1783–1839), second governor of Alabama from 1820 to 1821. Member of George Lodge No. 32, Warminster, Virginia.
- George Valentin Bibescu (1880–1941), Romanian aviation pioneer, Grand Master of Romanian Grand Lodge from 1911 to 1916
- Dana X. Bible (1891–1980), American football player, coach of football, basketball, and baseball, and college athletics administrator. Member of Mossy Creek Lodge No. 353, Jefferson City, Tennessee.
- Thomas Walter Bickett (1869–1921), 54th governor of North Carolina. Raised in Louisburg Lodge No. 413, Louisburg, North Carolina, on 2 October 1901, demitting to William G. Hill Lodge No. 218 at Raleigh in 1921. In 1917 he was grand orator of the Grand Lodge of North Carolina.
- Edward Biddle (1738–1779), American soldier, lawyer, and statesman from Pennsylvania. Was a delegate to the First Continental Congress in 1774 and 1775. Raised in Lodge No. 2, Philadelphia, on 29 March 1763.
- Benjamin Alden Bidlack (1804–1849), congressman from Pennsylvania. Raised in Lodge No. 61, Wilkes-Barre, Pennsylvania, on 1 May 1826.
- John Bidwell (1819–1900), California pioneer and politician. Raised in San Jose Lodge No. 10 in 1851 and later affiliated with Chico Lodge No. 111.
- Albert Bierstadt (1830–1902), German-American painter known for landscapes of the American West. Member of Holland Lodge No. 8, New York City.
- Timothy Bigelow (1767–1821), American lawyer. Grand master of the Grand Lodge of Massachusetts two terms, 1806–08 and 1811–13.
- Benjamin T. Biggs (1821–1893), 46th governor of Delaware. Member of Union Lodge No. 5, Middletown, Delaware.
- John Bigler (1805–1871), third governor of California. Initiated in Pacific Lodge, Long's Bar, Butte County, California, in 1850 and later a member of Tehama Lodge No. 3, Sacramento, and Washington Lodge No. 20, Sacramento.
- Louis Pierre Édouard, Baron Bignon (1771–1841), French diplomat and historian
- Theodore G. Bilbo (1877–1947), 39th and 43rd governor of Mississippi. U.S. senator from Mississippi. Raised 17 April 1899 in Claiborn Lodge No. 293 at Nashville, Tennessee, and affiliated with Sherrard Byrd Lodge No. 353 at Poplarville, Mississippi. Eventually suspended for non-payment of dues.
- William Billers, English haberdasher
- Henry Harrison Bingham (1841–1912), Union Army officer during the American Civil War, congressman from Pennsylvania. Chartiers Lodge #297, Canonsburg, Pennsylvania.
- Hiram Bingham III (1875–1956), American explorer, discovered the ruins of Machu Picchu. Hiram Lodge No. 1, Connecticut.
- Robert Worth Bingham (1871–1937), politician, judge, newspaper publisher and U.S. ambassador to the United Kingdom. Past master of Falls City Lodge No. 376 of Louisville, Kentucky. At a meeting of the Grand Lodge of England, in the presence of the King and 8,000 Masons, he was created a past senior grand warden of that grand lodge.
- Stanislav Binički (1872–1942), Serbian musician
- Leon Milton Birkhead (1885–1954), American Unitarian minister
- David B. Birney (1825–1864), Union general in the American Civil War. Initiated in Franklin Lodge No. 134 of Philadelphia on 31 October 1850.
- Francis Bischof (1904–1979), Queensland Australia Police Commissioner from 1958 to 1969
- Henry Bishop, English composer of "Home! Sweet Home!"
- George Bishop (1785–1861), English astronomer
- William Bizzell (1876–1944), fifth president of the University of Oklahoma and president of Agricultural and Mechanical College of Texas (now Texas A&M University)
- Sveinn Björnsson (1881–1952), first president of the Republic of Iceland. One of the founders of Edda Lodge in Reykjavík on 6 January 1919 under the authority of the National Grand Lodge of Denmark and was later Grand master of Iceland.
- Frank S. Black (1853–1913), American newspaper editor, lawyer and politician. Member of the U.S. House of Representatives from 1895 to 1897, and the 32nd governor of New York from 1897 to 1898. Raised in King Solomon's Primitive Lodge No. 91 of Troy, New York, and later affiliated with Roman Lodge No. 223 at Rome, New York.
- Hugo Black (1886–1971), Associate Justice of the Supreme Court of the United States (1937–1971). Birmingham Temple Lodge No. 836, Birmingham, Alabama.
- James D. Black (1849–1938), 39th governor of Kentucky. Grand master of Grand Lodge of Kentucky in 1888–89.
- John Black (1832–1838), politician from the U.S. state of Mississippi, most notably serving in the U.S. Senate as a Whig from 1832 to 1838. Member of Rising Virtue Lodge No. 7.
- John C. Black (1839–1915), U.S. congressman from Illinois; received the Medal of Honor for his actions as a Union Army lieutenant colonel and regimental commander at the Battle of Prairie Grove during the American Civil War. Member of Olive Branch Lodge No. 38, Danville, Illinois, and grand orator of the Grand Lodge of Illinois from 1894 to 1895.
- Lloyd Llewellyn Black (1889–1950), U.S. federal judge
- Samuel W. Black (1816–1862), lawyer, soldier, judge, and politician. Seventh governor of the Nebraska Territory. Killed in action leading his regiment in a charge early in the Civil War. Member of St. John's Lodge No. 219, Pittsburgh, Pennsylvania.
- Joseph Clay Stiles Blackburn (1838–1918), congressman and senator from Kentucky
- Luke P. Blackburn (1816–1887), 28th governor of Kentucky. Member of Landmark Lodge No. 41, Versailles, Kentucky.
- Robert E. Lee Blackburn (1870–1935), congressman from Kentucky
- Isaac Blackford (1786–1859), second Chief Justice of the Indiana Supreme Court. Member of Harmony Lodge No. 11 at Brookville, Indiana.
- Robert J. Blackham (1868–1951), author of Apron Men; The Romance of Freemasonry
- William W. Blackney (1876–1963), congressman from Michigan
- J. Stuart Blackton (1875–1941), Anglo-American film producer, considered the father of American animation. Member of Centennial Lodge No. 763, New York City.
- Ken Blackwell (1948– ), American politician and activist, mayor of Cincinnati, Ohio, from 1979 to 1980 and Ohio Secretary of State from 1999 to 2007
- Ibra Charles Blackwood (1878–1936), 97th governor of South Carolina. Raised in Spartan Lodge No. 70, Spartanburg, South Carolina, 20 August 1903. Grand Lodge of South Carolina.
- James T. Blair Jr. (1902–1962), 44th governor of Missouri. Raised in Jefferson Lodge No. 43, Jefferson City, Missouri, 14 October 1925.
- John Blair Jr. (1732–1800), Associate Justice of the Supreme Court of the United States (1789–96), and Grand Master of Virginia from 1778 to 1784
- William Rufus Blake (1805–1863), Canadian stage actor. Member of Independent Royal Arch Lodge No. 2 of New York City.
- Sir Thomas Blamey (1884–1951), Australian field marshal, Chief Commissioner of the Victoria Police
- Mel Blanc (1908–1989), American voice actor. Mid Day Lodge No. 188, Oregon.
- Antonio Guzmán Blanco (1829–1899), three-time president of Venezuela
- Richard P. Bland (1835–1899), congressman from Missouri. Member of Rolla Lodge No. 213, Rolla, Missouri.
- Theodorick Bland (1741–1790), represented Virginia in both the Continental Congress and the U.S. House of Representatives. Present at Williamsburg Lodge No. 6 on 7 July 1778.
- William Thomas Bland (1861–1928), congressman from Missouri
- Henry G. Blasdel (1825–1900), first governor of Nevada. Member of Santa Cruz Lodge No. 38, Santa Cruz, California, and later past master of Carson Lodge No. 1, Carson City, Nevada.
- Samuel Blatchford (1820–1893), Associate Justice of the Supreme Court of the United States (1882–1893)
- Valentin Blatz (1826–1894), German-American brewer and banker. Founder of Blatz Beer. Member of Aurora Lodge No. 10, Milwaukee, Wisconsin.
- Cadwallader Blayney, 9th Baron Blayney (1720–1775), Grand Master of the Moderns from 1764 to 1767 and of Ireland in 1768
- Jesse Bledsoe (1776–1836), U.S. senator from Kentucky. Member of Lexington Lodge No. 1, Lexington, Kentucky, and past master of same. Grand Tyler of the Grand Lodge of Kentucky in 1808.
- Samuel T. Bledsoe (1868–1939), 16th president of Atchison, Topeka and Santa Fe Railway
- Harman Blennerhassett (1764–1831), Anglo-Irish lawyer and politician. Member of Harmony Lodge No. 1 at Natchez, Mississippi, among others.
- Archie Bleyer (1909–1989), American song arranger, bandleader, and record company executive. Member of St. Cecile Lodge No. 568, New York City.
- Edward Bligh, 2nd Earl of Darnley (1715–1747), Irish peer
- Aaron T. Bliss (1837–1906), congressman from and the 25th governor of Michigan. Member of Saginaw Valley Lodge No. 154 at Saginaw, Michigan.
- Antonio Blitz (1810–1877), magician who worked mainly in Europe and the United States. Honorary member of Montgomery Lodge No. 19 of Philadelphia.
- Timothy Bloodworth (1736–1814), U.S. senator from North Carolina
- Moses Bloom (1833–1893), Iowa politician
- Sol Bloom (1870–1949), congressman from New York
- Joseph Bloomfield (1753–1823), fourth governor of New Jersey. Raised in Bristol Lodge No. 25, Bristol, Pennsylvania, and served as master in 1782. He affiliated with Trenton Lodge No. 5, Trenton, New Jersey, in 1790 and in 1799–80 was Grand Master of the Grand Lodge of New Jersey.
- Sumner Blossom (1892–1977), American magazine editor. Worked as editor for Popular Science magazine in the 1920s.
- Willie Blount (1768–1835), third governor of Tennessee. Member of Unanimity Lodge No. 54 of North Carolina.
- Gebhard Leberecht von Blücher (1742–1819), Graf (count), later elevated to Fürst (prince) von Wahlstatt, was a Prussian Generalfeldmarschall (field marshal) who led his army against Napoleon I at the Battle of the Nations at Leipzig in 1813 and at the Battle of Waterloo in 1815 with the Duke of Wellington. His original lodge is not known, but he was a constant visitor in the Lodge "Pax Inimicamalis" at Emmeriah in 1800–01, and in 1814 the Lodge "Archimedes" at Altenburg.
- Monte Blue (1887–1963), American silent movie actor. Member of Utopia Lodge No. 537 of Los Angeles.
- Robert D. Blue (1898–1989), 30th governor of Iowa. Mason, Shriner, member of Eastern Star and White Shrine.
- Fred H. Blume (1875–1971), Justice of the Wyoming Supreme Court for 42 years
- Elijah Boardman (1760–1823), U.S. senator from Connecticut. Member of Columbia Lodge No. 25 at Stepney, Connecticut, and in 1809 of Hiram Lodge No. 1, New Haven.
- Victor V. Boatner (1881–1950), American railroad executive
- Hiram Abiff Boaz (1866–1962), president of Polytechnic College from 1902 to 1911, and of Southern Methodist University from 1920 to 1922. Member of Granger Lodge No. 677, Granger, Texas. Grand Chaplain of the Grand Lodge of Texas in 1953.
- Manchester Boddy (1891–1967), rose from poverty to become the publisher of a major California newspaper and a candidate for Congress. Member of Craftsmen Lodge No. 559, Los Angeles.
- Johann Joachim Christoph Bode (1731–1793), German translator of literary works. Wrote extensively on Freemasonry and was one of the most distinguished Masons of his time. Member and Past Master of Lodge Absalem at Hamburg. Served as deputy grand master of the Grand Lodge of Hamburg.
- John Edward Courtenay Bodley (1853–1925), British civil servant. Member of Apollo University Lodge.
- Joseph R. Bodwell (1818–1887), 40th governor of Maine. Member of Rockland Lodge No. 79, Rockland, Maine.
- Johann von Böber (1746–1820), German teacher, entomologist and botanist who was a Russian Royal Councilor of State. Grand master of the Grand Lodge of Russia from 1811 to 1814.
- Lewis V. Bogy (1813–1877), U.S. senator from Missouri. Member of Polar Star Lodge No. 79 of St. Louis, Missouri.
- Dimitrie Bolintineanu (1819–1872), Romanian poet, politician, 1848 revolutionary
- Simón Bolívar (1783–1830), leader of South American independence (initiated: Cádiz, Spain) Founding brother of Lodge Order and Liberty No. 2, Peru, 1824.
- Cezar Bolliac (1813–1881), Romanian politician, amateur archaeologist, journalist and Romantic poet
- Jérôme Bonaparte (1784–1860), youngest brother of Napoleon Bonaparte and served as Jerome I, King of Westphalia, between 1807 and 1813. Grand master of the Grand Orient of Westphalia.
- Joseph Bonaparte (1768–1844), elder brother of Napoleon Bonaparte, who made him King of Naples and Sicily (1806–1808), and later King of Spain (1808–1813, as José I). Appointed as grand master of the Grand Orient of France by Napoleon in 1805.
- Louis Bonaparte (1778—1846), brother of Napoleon Bonaparte and King of Holland (1806–10). Appointed Deputy Grand Master of the Grand Orient of France in 1805.
- Lucien Bonaparte (1775–1840), brother of Napoleon Bonaparte and a member of the Grand Orient of France
- Shadrach Bond (1773–1832), American politician, first governor of Illinois
- Thomas Bond (1712–784), American physician and surgeon. In 1751 he co-founded the Pennsylvania Hospital, the first medical facility in the American colonies, with Benjamin Franklin. Deputy grand master of the Grand Lodge of Pennsylvania in 1749.
- Omar Bongo (1935–2009), president of Gabon
- Andrés Bonifacio (1863–1897), leader during Philippine Revolution from Spain. Taliba Lodge No. 165 under Gran Oriente Español (Spanish Grand Lodge).
- Nicholas Bonneville (1760–1828), French bookseller, printer, journalist, and writer; also a political figure of some relevance at the time of the French Revolution. In 1788 he published a book entitled The Jesuits driven from Freemasonry and their weapon broken by the Freemasons (translation). His theory was that the Jesuits had introduced the history of the life and death of the Templars into the symbolic degrees, and the doctrine of vengeance for the political and religious crime of their destruction.
- Ballington Booth (1857–1940), officer in the Salvation Army and a co-founder of Volunteers of America. Member of Montclair Lodge No. 144, New Jersey, about 1899, and later Charter Oak Lodge No. 249, New York City. He was past grand chaplain of the Grand Lodge of New York and member of York and Scottish rites as well as the Shrine.
- Edwin Booth (1833–1893), famous 19th-century American actor who toured throughout America and the major capitals of Europe, performing Shakespearean plays. Founded Booth's Theatre in 1869 in New York. Brother of John Wilkes Booth. Honorary member of the Masonic Veterans Association of New York.
- Felix Booth (1780–1850), English gin distiller
- Edward Bootle-Wilbraham, 1st Earl of Lathom (1837–1898), British politician. Member of Apollo University Lodge.
- Robert Borden (1854–1937), Prime Minister of Canada. St. Andrew's Lodge No. 1, Halifax, Nova Scotia.
- Gutzon Borglum (1867–1941), American sculptor, planned and started sculpture on Mount Rushmore. Raised in Howard Lodge No. 35.
- Lincoln Borglum (1912–1986), son of Gutzon Borglum; completed the Mount Rushmore project. Raised in Battle River Lodge No. 92.
- Ernest Borgnine (1917–2012), American actor. Abingdon Lodge No. 48; however, another source indicates Melrose Lodge No. 63, California.
- Solon Borland (1808–1864), newspaperman, soldier, diplomat, Democratic U.S. senator from Arkansas and a Confederate officer during the American Civil War
- Józef Boruwłaski (1739–1837), Polish-born dwarf who toured in European and Turkish courts. Raised to the 3rd degree in the city of Chester, England, on 15 November 1783.
- George Boscawen, 2nd Earl of Falmouth (1811–1852), British peer and member of Apollo University Lodge
- Sir Alexander Boswell, 1st Baronet (1775–1822), Scottish poet, antiquary and songwriter. Ex-officio provincial grand master of Ayrshire and master of Canongate-Kilwinning Lodge No. 2 in Edinburgh.
- James Boswell (1740–1795), British biographer, raised in Canongate Kilwinning Lodge at Edinburgh, 1759
- John Boswell (1532?–1609), 3rd Laird of Auchinleck. Considered by some scholars to be the first recorded non-operative Freemason. Present at a meeting of the (operative) Lodge of Edinburgh on 8 June 1600, and like his operative brethren, attested to the minutes by his mark.
- Pik Botha (1932–2018), South African politician
- Giovanni Bottesini (1821–1889), Italian Romantic composer, conductor, and a double bass virtuoso. Initiated 20 June 1849 in the Bank of England Lodge No. 263, London.
- Karl Böttiger (1760–1835), German archaeologist and classicist. Initiated in the Lodge of the Golden Apple, Dresden, on 8 November 1781.
- C. A. Bottolfsen (1891–1964), American politician from Idaho. 17th and 19th governor of Idaho. A member of Arco Lodge No. 48, Arco, Idaho, and a past district deputy grand master. Knight Templar and Shriner.
- Thomas Boude (1752–1822), the brick mason for Independence Hall in Philadelphia. First secretary of St. John's Lodge in Philadelphia which laid the cornerstone of the hall with Benjamin Franklin as grand master. Boude later became deputy grand master of the Grand Lodge of Pennsylvania.
- Elias Cornelius Boudinot (1835–1890), Cherokee attorney, politician and military officer. Delegate to the Arkansas secession convention, Boudinot served as a colonel in the Confederate States Army, and was elected as an Arkansas representative in the Confederate Congress. It is believed that Albert Pike conferred the 32° on him in 1886. He died 27 September 1890 and was buried with Masonic honors by Belle Point Lodge No. 20 of Fort Smith, Arkansas.
- Louis de Bourbon (1709–1771), Count of Clermont. Elected Grand Master of France 2 December 1743. It was during his grandmastership that the name was changed from the "English Grand Lodge of France" to the "Grand Lodge of France".
- Thomas E. Bourke (1896–1978), U.S. Marine Corps general who, during World War II, commanded Marine artillery units at the battles of Guadalcanal, Tarawa and Leyte. At the end of World War II, he commanded the 5th Marine Division in the occupation of Japan, and the Fleet Marine Force, Pacific.
- Augustus O. Bourn (1834–1925), American politician and the 36th governor of Rhode Island. Raised 18 May 1860 in What Cheer Lodge No. 21, Providence.
- Robin Bourne-Taylor, British rower and soldier. Member of Apollo University Lodge.
- Sir Mackenzie Bowell (1823–1917), PC, KCMG, English-born Canadian politician. Fifth prime minister of Canada. Raised in St. Lawrence Lodge No. 640 of Montreal in 1864. On 4 February 1897 he affiliated with Eureka Lodge No. 283 (Grand Lodge of Canada in Ontario), at Belleville, and was later a charter member of Moira Lodge No. 11 at Belleville.
- William Bowen (1876–1965), British trade unionist and politician
- James Bowie (1796–1836), frontiersman, inventor of the Bowie knife. L'Humble Chaumiere Lodge No. 19, Opelousas, Louisiana.
- Oden Bowie (1826–1894), 34th governor of Maryland. Member of Centre Lodge No. 108, Baltimore.
- Henry L. Bowles (1866–1932), congressman from Massachusetts
- William Augustus Bowles (1763–1805), also known as "Estajoca", Maryland-born English adventurer and organizer of Native American attempts to create their own state outside of Euro-American control. Was "admitted an honorary member" of Prince of Wales Lodge No. 259, London, on 20 January 1791. He was made "Provincial grand master to the Creek, Cherokee, Chickasaw and Choctaw Indians" by the Grand Lodge of England.
- Frank Llewellyn Bowman (1879–1936), congressman from West Virginia
- Sir Leslie Boyce (1895–1955), K.St.J., Australian-born British Conservative Party politician. Lord Mayor of London between 1951 and 1952. Senior grand warden of the Grand Lodge of England in 1948.
- Robert Prettyman Boyce (c. 1814–1888), member of the Texas Army, businessman and municipal official in Houston.
- William D. Boyce (1858–1929), founder of the Boy Scouts of America
- James E. Boyd (1834–1906), Irish-born American businessman and politician. Seventh governor of Nebraska. Member of Capitol Lodge No. 3, Omaha.
- William Boyd, 4th Earl of Kilmarnock (1704–1746), Jacobite politician, Grand Master of Scotland (1742–1743)
- Jean-Pierre Boyer (1776–1850), one of the leaders of the Haitian Revolution, and president of Haiti from 1818 to 1843. He was grand commander of the Supreme Council AASR of Haiti, 33°. Frequent visitor to Somerset Lodge No. 34, Norwich, Connecticut.
- Frank W. Boykin (1885–1969), congressman from Alabama. Scottish Rite, Shriner, and Eastern Star.
- Murrough Boyle, 1st Viscount Blesington (c. 1645–1718), first Grand Master of the Ancients, 1756–60
- Emerson R. Boyles (1881–1960), member of the Michigan Supreme Court from 1940 until 1956
- James S. Boynton (1833–1902), American politician and jurist. Served briefly as the 51st governor of Georgia. Member of St. John's Lodge No. 45, Jackson, Georgia.
- Paul Boyton (1848–1924), Irish showman and adventurer. Known as the "Fearless Frogman".
- William Brabazon, 11th Earl of Meath (1803–1887), Irish peer. Member of Apollo University Lodge.
- John Bracken (1883–1969), PC, 11th Premier of Manitoba
- Hugh Henry Brackenridge (1748–1816), American writer, lawyer, judge, and Pennsylvania Supreme Court justice. Member of Lodge No. 45, Pittsburgh.
- Theophilus Bradbury (1739–1803), congressman from Massachusetts. Justice of the Massachusetts Supreme Judicial Court.
- William Bradford (1755–1795), second U.S. Attorney General in 1794–1795. Member of Lodge No. 2, Philadelphia.
- Charles Bradlaugh (1833–1891), 19th-century atheist and Republican MP, Grand Lodge des Philadelphes, London (resigned his affiliation with English Freemasonry in 1874, but maintained an affiliation with a French Lodge)
- Henry D. Bradley (1893–1973), publisher of the St. Joseph News-Press; first member of the Bradley family which controls the News-Press & Gazette Company media company. Member of Sanford L. Collins Lodge No. 396 of Toledo, Ohio.
- James Bradley (1692–1762), English Astronomer Royal
- Omar Bradley (1893–1981), U.S. general. West Point Lodge No. 877, New York.
- Tom Bradley (1917–1998), American politician; mayor of Los Angeles, 1973 to 1993
- Willis W. Bradley (1884–1954), U.S. naval officer, recipient of the Medal of Honor, and congressman from California. Scottish Rite 32°, Knight Templar, and Shriner. President of National Sojourners.
- Donald Bradman (1908–2001), Australian cricketer. Initiated Lodge Arcadia No 177 UGLNSW on 11 June 1920.
- John Bradstreet (1714–1774), British Army major general who served during King George's War, the French and Indian War, and Pontiac's Rebellion. Also served as the Commodore-Governor for Newfoundland. Mason in Nova Scotia.
- Hugh Brady (1768–1851), American general from Pennsylvania who served in the Northwest Indian War under General Anthony Wayne, and during the War of 1812. Initiated 9 June 1797 in Lodge No. 22, Sunbury, Pennsylvania, and withdrew 15 January 1805.
- James H. Brady (1862–1918), U.S. senator and eighth governor of Idaho
- Johannes Brahms (1833–1897), German composer
- David Legge Brainard ((1856–1946)), American Arctic explorer and brigadier general. Member of Marathon Lodge No. 438, Marathon, New York.
- Thomas E. Bramlette (1817–1875), 23rd governor of Kentucky. Was Master of Albany Lodge No. 260, Albany, Kentucky.
- John Branch (1782–1863), U.S. senator, eighth Secretary of the Navy, 19th governor of North Carolina, and sixth and last territorial governor of Florida. Member of Royal White Hart Lodge No. 2, Halifax, North Carolina.
- Christoffel Brand (1797–1875), first speaker of the Legislative Assembly of the Cape Colony
- James T. Brand (1886–1964), 31st Chief Justice of the Oregon Supreme Court. A judge at the Nuremberg trials.
- William W. Brandon (1868–1934), 37th governor of Alabama. Member of Rising Virtue Lodge No. 4 at Tuscaloosa, Alabama.
- Samuel Brannan (1819–1889), American settler, businessman, journalist, and prominent Mormon who founded the California Star newspaper in San Francisco. Member of California Lodge No. 1 of San Francisco.
- Terry Branstad (1946– ), 12th United States Ambassador to China, 39th and 42nd Governor of Iowa. Member and K.C.C.H. of the Des Moines Scottish Rite Valley.
- John Brant (1794–1832), Mohawk chief and government official in Upper Canada. Member of Union Lodge No. 24, Ancaster.
- Joseph Brant (1743–1807), principal chief of the Six Nations people. Initiated in Lodge No. 417, 1776. First Master of Lodge No. 11, Mohawk Village (near Brantford) in 1798.
- Charles Wesley Brashares (1891–1982), American bishop of the Methodist Church and the United Methodist Church. Raised in Harmony Lodge No. 38, Gorham, Maine. Demitted.
- Thomas Brassey, 1st Earl Brassey (1836–1918), governor of Victoria, Grand Master of the United Grand Lodge of Victoria Member of Apollo University Lodge
- Alva J. Brasted (1876–1965), fourth Chief of Chaplains of the United States Army. Member of Sojourners Lodge No. 51, Washington, DC.
- Dimitrie Brătianu (1818–1892), Prime Minister of Romania (1881)
- Ion C. Brătianu (1821–1891), Romanian politician, three-time prime minister of Romania
- Sam G. Bratton (1888–1963), U.S. senator from New Mexico. Member of Clovis Lodge No. 40, Clovis, New Mexico, 32° Scottish Rite in Valley of Santa Fe, Ballut Abyad Shrine Temple in Albuquerque and member of the Order of DeMolay.
- Mason Brayman (1813–1895), American attorney, newspaperman, and Union Army brigadier general during the American Civil War. Seventh governor of the Idaho Territory. Member of Springfield Lodge No. 4 of Springfield, Illinois.
- David Brearley (1745–1790), signer of the U.S. Constitution on behalf of New Jersey. The first Grand Master of Masons for the state of New Jersey.
- John Breathitt (1786–1834), 11th governor of Kentucky. Member of Russellville Lodge No. 17 of Russellville, Kentucky.
- Daniel Breck (1788–1871), congressman from Kentucky and member of the Supreme Court of Kentucky. Served as Master of Richmond Lodge No. 25 in Richmond, Kentucky, and was Grand Master of Kentucky in 1827–28.
- John C. Breckinridge (1821–1875), 14th and youngest-ever Vice President of the United States. Expelled from the U.S. Senate after joining the Confederate Army. Member of Good Samaritan Lodge No. 174 at Lexington, Kentucky. Was suspended in 1861 and reinstated in 1871. Scottish Rite 33°.
- Robert Jefferson Breckinridge (1800–1871), politician and Presbyterian minister in Kentucky. He was a member of the Kentucky House of Representatives and Superintendent of Public Education in that state. Member of Lexington Lodge No. 1 in Lexington.
- William Campbell Preston Breckinridge (1837–1904), congressman from Kentucky. Member of Lexington Lodge No. 1 in Lexington and delivered the oration at the cornerstone laying of the Masonic Temple in Richmond, Virginia, in 1888.
- Robert Bree (1759–1839), English physician
- Ernest R. Breech (1897–1978), American corporate executive. Remembered for his work in revitalizing the Ford Motor Company in the years following World War II. Also served similar roles at Trans World Airlines and other companies. Raised in Austin Lodge No. 850, Chicago, and was the Sovereign Grand Inspector General of the Scottish Rite in Michigan.
- Edmund Breese (1871–1936), American stage and film actor of the silent film era. Member of St. John's Lodge No. 6, Norwalk, Connecticut.
- Sidney Breese (1800–1878), U.S. senator from Illinois, Chief Justice of the Illinois Supreme Court, Speaker of the Illinois House of Representatives, a forefather of Illinois, and "father of the Illinois Central Railroad". Member and Master of Scott Lodge No. 79, Carlyle, Illinois.
- Walter E. Brehm (1892–1971), congressman from Ohio. Member, Secretary, and Master of Mingo Lodge No. 171, Logan, Ohio.
- Anders Behring Breivik, arrested for 2011 Norway attacks. Was a member of Lodge St. Olaus T.D. Tre Søiler No. 8 in Oslo. Formally excluded (expelled) from Freemasonry in 2011.
- Bernard Bresslaw (1934–1993), British actor
- Lionel Brett (1911–1990), Nigerian jurist and member of the Supreme Court of Nigeria. Member of Apollo University Lodge.
- Sereno E. Brett (1891–1952), highly decorated brigadier general of the U.S. Army who served in both world wars. Member of Hancock Lodge No. 311, Fort Leavenworth, Kansas.
- Walter Breuning, world's oldest man at the time of his death of natural causes on 14 April 2011, aged 114 years, six months, twenty-five days. Member of Great Falls Lodge No. 118, Great Falls, Montana, for over 85 years.
- Earl L. Brewer (11 August 1869 – 10 March 1942), 38th governor of Mississippi
- Owen Brewster (1888–1961), U.S. senator, congressman, and 54th governor of Maine. Member of Penobscot Lodge No. 39, Dexter, Maine. Member of York Rite, Scottish Rite, DeMolay, and Shriner. When Harry S. Truman, a fellow senator, was grand master of the Grand Lodge of Missouri, Brewster spoke at the grand lodge session at Truman's request.
- Aristide Briand, Prime Minister of France. Initiated in the lodge Le Trait d'Union in July 1887 (not recorded). Declared "unworthy" by Le Trait d'Union on 6 September 1889. Joined in the lodge Le Chavalier du Travail, in Paris in 1895.
- John W. Bricker (1893–1986), U.S. senator and the 54th governor of Ohio. Member of Mt. Sterling Lodge No. 269, Mount Vernon, Ohio. York Rite, 33° Scottish Rite, and Shriner.
- John Bridges (1666–1724), English topographer
- Styles Bridges (1898–1961), 63rd governor of New Hampshire before a 24-year career in the U.S. Senate. Received the degrees in Morning Sun Lodge, Conway, Massachusetts, and later member of Eureka Lodge, No. 70, Concord, New Hampshire.
- Ansel Briggs (1806–1881), first governor of Iowa. Member of Nebraska Lodge No. 1, Bellevue, Nebraska.
- Frank A. Briggs (1858–1898), fifth governor of North Dakota. 32° Scottish Rite.
- Frank P. Briggs (1894–1992), U.S. senator from Missouri. Grand Master of the Grand Lodge of Missouri in 1957.
- Elbert S. Brigham (1877–1962), congressman from Vermont
- Geraldo Bright, English bandleader known as "Geraldo"
- James Jefferson Britt (1861–1939), congressman from North Carolina
- James Broadhead (1819–1898), congressman from Missouri and first president of the American Bar Association. Member of Tuscan Lodge No. 360 of St. Louis.
- Daniel Brodhead (1736–1809), American military and political leader during the Revolutionary War and early days of the United States. Member of Lodge No. 3, Philadelphia.
- Israel Brodie, Chief Rabbi of Great Britain and the Commonwealth, 1948–1965
- William A. Brodie, laid the foundation stone of the Statue of Liberty on 5 August 1884 as Grand Master of New York
- Kazimierz Brodziński (1791–1835), Polish Romantic poet
- Henry P. H. Bromwell (1823–1903), congressman from Illinois. Prominent Masonic author including Restorations of Masonic Geometry and Symbolry Being a Dissertation on the Lost Knowledges of the Lodge. Raised in Temperance Lodge No. 16, Vandalia, Illinois, in 1854 and was Master in 1856. Grand Master of the Grand Lodge of Illinois in 1864. Later moved to Colorado, where he affiliated with Denver Lodge No. 5. Grand Orator of Colorado in 1874. Member of York and Scottish Rites.
- Greene C. Bronson (1789–1863), Chief Justice of New York
- John R. Brooke (1838–1926), major general in the Union Army during the American Civil War and the Spanish–American War. Served as a military governor of Puerto Rico and governor of Cuba. Member of Columbia Chapter No. 21, R.A.M. Philadelphia.
- Robert Brooke (c. 1761 – 1800), tenth governor of Virginia. Member and Master of Fredericksburg Lodge No. 4 and became Grand Master of Virginia in November 1795.
- Walker Brooke (1813–1869), U.S. senator from Mississippi. Member of Hill City Lodge No. 121, Vicksburg, Mississippi.
- Bryant Butler Brooks (1861–1944), seventh governor of Wyoming. Member of Ashlar Lodge No. 10 at Douglas, Wyoming, and later of Casper Lodge No. 15, Casper, including past master. Grand orator of the Grand Lodge of Wyoming in 1940.
- Charles W. Brooks (1897–1957), U.S. senator from Illinois. Raised 24 January 1920 in Wheaton Lodge No. 269, Wheaton, Illinois. Grand Orator of the Grand Lodge of Illinois in 1946. Scottish Rite 33° and York Rite member.
- Henry Luesing Brooks (1905–1971), U.S. federal judge. Member of Louisville Lodge No. 400, Louisville, Kentucky.
- John Brooks (1752–1825), 11th governor of Massachusetts. Member of Washington Lodge No. 10 (Military) under Grand Lodge of Massachusetts.
- Overton Brooks (1897–1961), congressman from Louisiana. Raised in Joppa Lodge No. 362, Shreveport, about 1921. 32° Scottish Rite, Shriner and honorary member of National Sojourners.
- Stratton D. Brooks (1870–1949), third president of the University of Oklahoma and eleventh president of the University of Missouri. Member of Norman Lodge No. 38, Norman, Oklahoma. Member of Royal Arch and DeMolay.
- Jacob Broom (1752–1810), signer of the U.S. Constitution. Early member of Lodge No. 14, Wilmington, Delaware.
- Henry Brougham, Scottish abolitionist and founder of the Edinburgh Review. Raised in Fortrose Lodge, Stornoway, Scotland.
- J. Melville Broughton (1888–1949), 60th governor of North Carolina from 1941 to 1945. Member of Wake Forest Lodge No. 282.
- Aaron V. Brown (1795–1859), 11th governor of Tennessee and 17th U.S. Postmaster General. Junior Grand Warden of the Grand Lodge of Tennessee in 1825.
- Albert G. Brown (1813–1880), 14th governor of Mississippi. Member of Gallatin Lodge No. 25, Gallatin, Mississippi.
- Clarence J. Brown, newspaper publisher, Ohio politician, congressman
- Daniel Russell Brown (1848–1919), 43rd governor of Rhode Island
- Egbert B. Brown (1816–1902), Union general in the Trans-Mississippi Theater of the American Civil War. Member of Toledo Lodge No. 144, Toledo, Ohio.
- Fred H. Brown (1879–1955), 59th governor of New Hampshire
- Gustavus Richard Brown (1747–1804), one of the doctors summoned to attend to George Washington the night he died. One of the organizers of St. Columbia Lodge No. 10, Port Tobacco, Maryland, and was the fifth grand master of Maryland in 1797.
- Jacob Brown (1775–1828), Commanding General of the United States Army from June 1821 until his death. Received degrees in Ontario Lodge at Sackets Harbor, New York, and later a member of Watertown Lodge No. 49, Watertown, New York.
- Joe E. Brown (1891–973), American film actor active from 1928 to 1964. Member of Rubicon Lodge No. 237, Toledo, Ohio, and of Al Malaikah Shrine in Los Angeles.
- John Brown (1800–1859), American who led an anti-slavery revolt in Harpers Ferry, Virginia in 1859. Freemason who later became an Anti-Mason.
- John Brown, represented Virginia in the Continental Congress and U.S. House of Representatives. Introduced the bill granting statehood to Kentucky and would become the first U.S. senator from that state. Member of Lexington Lodge No. 1, Lexington.
- John C. Brown (1827–1889), 19th governor of Tennessee and Confederate general. A member of Pulaski Lodge No. 101, Pulaski, Tennessee, and was Grand Master of the Grand Lodge of Tennessee in 1869.
- Norris Brown (1863–1960), U.S. senator from Nebraska
- Prentiss M. Brown (1889–1973), congressman and senator from Michigan. Member of St. Ignace Lodge No. 369, St. Ignace, Michigan. Received the Scottish Rite (Northern Jurisdiction) 33° in October 1955.
- Solomon G. Brown, first African American employee of the Smithsonian Institution
- Thomas Brown (1785–1867), second governor of Florida. Raised in Hiram Lodge No. 59 of Virginia in August 1807. Became a member of Jackson Lodge No. 1, Tallahassee, serving as secretary in 1833 and master in 1855. Grand Master of the Grand Lodge of Florida in 1849. Grand secretary of the Grand Lodge of Florida from 1834 to 1835.
- Vernon J. Brown (1874–1964), 45th lieutenant governor of Michigan
- Charles Farrar Browne (1834–1867), American humor writer, better known under his nom de plume "Artemus Ward". Received the Masonic degrees in Manhattan Lodge No. 62, New York City, in the fall of 1863.
- Edward E. Browne (1868–1945), congressman from Wisconsin
- Gordon Browning (1889–1976), 38th governor of Tennessee. Member of Huntingdon Lodge No. 106, Huntingdon, Tennessee.
- Charles B. Brownson (1914–1988), congressman from Indiana. Raised in Mystic Tie Lodge No. 398 of Indianapolis in 1950.
- Nathan Brownson (1742–1796), physician and statesman from Riceboro, Georgia. Delegate to the Continental Congress in 1777 and was governor of Georgia in 1781. Member of North Star Lodge of Manchester, Vermont.
- Blanche Bruce, former slave who became a U.S. senator from Mississippi
- Charles Bruce, 5th Earl of Elgin, Scottish nobleman, Grand Master of Scotland (1761–1763)
- James Bruce (1730–1794), British explorer. Canongate Kilwinning Lodge.
- Stanley Bruce, 1st Viscount Bruce of Melbourne (1883–1967), eighth Prime Minister of Australia, initiated in the Old Melburnians Lodge No. 317 UGLV
- Walter Bruchhausen (1892–1976), U.S. federal judge
- Wilber M. Brucker (1894–1968), 32nd governor of Michigan; sixth U.S. Secretary of the Army. Raised in Salina Lodge No. 155 on 15 September 1915 and later served as Master of that lodge.
- Henry Bruckner (1871–1942), congressman from New York
- Samuel von Brukenthal, baron of the Holy Roman Empire
- Clement Laird Brumbaugh (1863–1921), congressman from Ohio
- D. Emmert Brumbaugh (1894–1977), congressman from Pennsylvania. Member of Woodbury Lodge No. 539 at Roaring Spring, Pennsylvania. Scottish Rite and Shriner.
- Martin Grove Brumbaugh (1862–1930), 26th governor of Pennsylvania. Member of Mt. Moriah Lodge No. 300, Huntingdon, Pennsylvania.
- Avery Brundage (1887–1975), fifth president of the International Olympic Committee. Member of North Shore Lodge No. 937, Chicago. Scottish Rite and Shriner.
- Duke Ferdinand of Brunswick-Wolfenbüttel (1721–1792), German-Prussian field marshal (1758–1766) known for his participation in the Seven Years' War. Initiated in 1740 in the Lodge of the Three Globes in Berlin and received the degree of Master Mason in 1743 at Breslau.
- George W. Brush (1842–1927), captain of a black company in the 34th Infantry Regiment U.S. Colored Troops in the Union Army during the American Civil War; received the Medal of Honor
- Henry Brush (1778–1855), congressman from Ohio and member of the Supreme Court of that state
- Edward George Bruton (1826–1899), British architect. Member of Apollo University Lodge.
- William Jennings Bryan, American politician, congressman, U. S. Secretary of State and presidential candidate. Lincoln Lodge No. 19, Lincoln, Nebraska.
- Joseph R. Bryson (1893–1953), congressman from South Carolina
- Francis Scott, 2nd Duke of Buccleuch (1695–1751), KT FRS Scottish nobleman, Grand Master of the Grand Lodge of England (Moderns) in 1723
- Charles Montagu-Scott, 4th Duke of Buccleuch (1772–1819), KT Scottish nobleman and 43rd Grand Master Mason of Scotland, 1800–1801
- 10th Earl of Buchan (See Henry Erskine, 10th Earl of Buchan)
- 11th Earl of Buchan (See David Erskine, 11th Earl of Buchan)
- 12th Earl of Buchan (See Henry Erskine, 12th Earl of Buchan)
- John Buchan, 2nd Baron Tweedsmuir (1911–1996), British naturalist and adventurer. Member of Apollo University Lodge.
- James Buchanan, U.S. president, Lodge No. 43, Lancaster, Pennsylvania
- John P. Buchanan (1847–1930), 25th governor of Texas. Member of Charles Fuller Lodge No. 412, Rutherford County, Tennessee, which was later Mt. Moriah Lodge No. 18, of Murfreesboro.
- George Villiers, 2nd Duke of Buckingham (1628–1687), KG PC FRS English peer and statesman
- Frank Buckles, last living American veteran of World War I
- Alexander Buckner (1785–1833), U.S. senator from Missouri. First Grand Master of Indiana.
- Simon Bolivar Buckner (1823–1914), 30th governor of Kentucky. Listed as a Freemason in the Grand Lodge of Kentucky proceedings of 1891.
- John Charles Bucknill (1817–1897), English psychiatrist
- Frederick G. Budlong (1881–1953), bishop of the Episcopal Diocese of Connecticut from 1934 to 1950
- Buffalo Bill (See William F. Cody)
- Howard Buffett (1903–1964), congressman from Nebraska. Raised in Covert Lodge No. 11, Omaha.
- Harold R. Bull (1893–1976), U.S. Army lieutenant general
- Archibald Bulloch (1730–1777), third governor of Georgia. Member of Solomons Lodge No. 1, Savannah.
- William Bellinger Bulloch (1777–1852), U.S. senator from Georgia
- Charles Buls, mayor of Brussels
- Edward Bulwer-Lytton, 1st Baron Lytton, politician and writer
- Alfred L. Bulwinkle (1883–1950), congressman from North Carolina
- Edward Buncombe (1742–1778), plantation owner from the Province of North Carolina who served as a colonel in the Continental Army in the American Revolutionary War. He is the namesake of Buncombe County in western North Carolina. Member of Unanimity Lodge No. 7 at Edenton, North Carolina. His degree dates were 16 May, 26 May, and 3 June 1776.
- Charles E. Bunnell (1878–1956), federal judge for the United States Fourth Judicial Division, and the University of Alaska's first president, from 1921 to 1949
- John Bunyan (1628–1688), English writer and preacher best remembered as the author of the religious allegory The Pilgrim's Progress. Denslow wrote, "Although it is not known whether he was a Freemason or not, his little-known work Solomon's Temple Spiritualized contains so much Masonic phraseology and dogma that it would be hard to believe that he did not have some knowledge of the Craft."
- Luther Burbank, U.S. horticulturist, botanist, agricultural science pioneer; Santa Rosa Lodge No. 57
- Henry Burbeck (1754–1848), served in the U.S. Army for more than forty years, most notably during the Revolutionary War and the War of 1812; achieved the rank of brigadier general
- Thomas G. Burch (1869–1951), congressman from Virginia
- William Burdett-Coutts (1851–1921), British politician. Member of Apollo University Lodge.
- Clark Burdick (1868–1948), congressman from Rhode Island
- Usher L. Burdick (1879–1960), congressman from North Dakota. Member of Mt. Moriah Lodge No. 51, Williston.
- Gottfried August Bürger (1747–1794), German poet; initiated in 1775
- John Smith de Burgh, 11th Earl of Clanricarde, Irish peer
- Ulick de Burgh, 1st Marquess of Clanricarde (1802–1874), British politician. Member of Apollo University Lodge.
- William O. Burgin (1877–1946), congressman from North Carolina
- Andrew H. Burke (1850–1918), second governor of North Dakota. 33° Scottish Rite (Southern Jurisdiction).
- Arleigh Burke, U.S. admiral; Supreme Temple Architect (honored in 1997)
- Edmund Burke, Irish politician and philosopher
- Edward R. Burke (1880–1968), U.S. senator from Nebraska. Member of Omaha Lodge No. 288, Omaha, Nebraska.
- Elmer Burkett (1867–1935), U.S. senator and congressman from Nebraska
- Edwin C. Burleigh (1843–1916), 42nd governor of Maine. Member of Augusta Lodge No. 141, Augusta, Maine.
- Albert S. Burleson (1863–1937), 45th U.S. Postmaster General and congressman from Texas
- Edward Burleson (1798–1851), third vice-president of the Republic of Texas. Member of Clinton Lodge No. 54, Bolivar, Tennessee.
- Anson Burlingame (1820–1870), American lawyer, legislator, and diplomat. Member of Amicable Lodge, Cambridge, Massachusetts.
- Robert Burnaby, English explorer and businessman. First Past Master of Victoria Lodge No. 1085, District Grand Master (English) of British Columbia.
- Alexander Burnes (1805–1841), Scottish explorer and diplomat associated with the Great Game
- James Burnes (1801–1862), Scottish surgeon in India
- David G. Burnet, first president of the Republic of Texas (interim); Holland Lodge No. 1
- Jacob Burnet (1770–1853), early leading citizen and U.S. senator from Ohio. Deputy Grand Master of the Grand Lodge of Ohio in 1810–1812.
- William Burnet (1730–1791), American political leader and physician from New Jersey who served in the Continental Army and the Continental Congress. When the grand lodge of New Jersey chartered Nova Caesarea Lodge No. 10 at Cincinnati on 8 September 1791, he was named as first master.
- George H. Burnett (1853–1927), 21st Chief Justice on the Oregon Supreme Court
- James Burnett, Lord Monboddo (1714–1799), Scottish judge, scholar of linguistic evolution, philosopher and deist. The Bulletin of the International Masonic Congress (1917) stated that he was a Freemason.
- Frederick Russell Burnham, American-born Victorian adventurer known as the father of Scouting. Chief Commissioner, Excelsior Lodge No. 195.
- George Burnham (1868–1939), congressman from San Diego
- Henry E. Burnham (1844–1917), U.S. senator from New Hampshire. Member of Washington Lodge No. 61, Manchester, was grand master of the Grand Lodge of New Hampshire in 1885, and was a 33° of the Scottish Rite.
- Bob Burns (1890–1956), American musical comedian. Invented the bazooka musical instrument from which the anti-tank weapon derived its name.
- Conrad Burns, U.S. senator from Montana
- Gilbert Burns (1760–1827), Scottish farmer and younger brother of Robert Burns, whose writings have contributed greatly to the bank of knowledge that exists regarding the life of his famous brother. Raised in St. James Lodge, No. 178, Tarbolton, 1 March 1786.
- Robert Burns, national poet of Scotland. St. David's Lodge No. 174, Tarbolton.
- George Burrington (1682–1759), governor of the Province of North Carolina from January 1724 to April 1725, and again from February 1731 to 1734. Member of the lodge at the "King's Arms on New Bond Street" in London, and his name also appears on the list of members of "Bear and Harrow in Butcher Roe", London, in 1730.
- Julius C. Burrows (1837–1915), congressman and senator from Michigan. Past master of Anchor Lodge of Strict Observance No. 87 at Kalamazoo and member of Kalamazoo Chapter, Royal Arch No. 13, and Peninsular Commandery No. 8, Knights Templar.
- Harold Hitz Burton, U.S. Supreme Court Associate Justice (1945–1958)
- Hutchins Gordon Burton (1774–1836), 22nd governor of North Carolina. Member of Phalanx Lodge No. 31, Charlotte.
- John Hill Burton (1809–1881), FRSE, Scottish advocate and historian. Historiographer Royal (1867–1881). Made a Freemason in Glenkindil Lodge No. 333, Scotland, on 17 August 1827.
- Richard Francis Burton, English explorer
- Robert Burton (1747–1825), American Revolutionary War officer. Member of Hiram Lodge No. 24 of Williamsborough, North Carolina.
- Theodore E. Burton (1851–1929), congressman and senator from Ohio. Member of Iris Lodge No. 229, Webb Chapter, R.A.M., Orion Commandery, K.T. and Al Koran Shrine Temple, all of Cleveland.
- William Burton (1789–1866), 39th governor of Delaware. Member of Temple Lodge No. 9 and Deputy Grand Master of the Grand Lodge of Delaware from 1851 to 1852.
- Vannevar Bush, Worshipful Master of Richard C. Maclaurin Lodge (M.I.T. Lodge or Tech Lodge)
- Harlan J. Bushfield (1882–1948), 16th U.S. senator from and 16th governor of South Dakota. Member of St. Lawrence Lodge No. 39 at Miller, South Dakota.
- Asa S. Bushnell (1834–1904), 40th governor of Ohio. Served as company commander in 152nd Ohio volunteer infantry in American Civil War. Made "Mason at sight".
- George E. Bushnell (1887–1965), member of the Michigan Supreme Court from 1934 to 1955. Raised in Taylor Lodge No. 23 at Salem, Virginia, in 1909 and served as master of Sojourners Lodge No. 483 of Detroit in 1925. He received his 33° in 1924. Bushnell was a member of the Masonic Service Association European Committee sent abroad in 1945 to investigate the state of the Craft in Europe following the war.
- Anastasio Bustamante (1780–1853), three-time president of Mexico
- Benjamin Butler (1818–1893), 33rd governor of Massachusetts. Major general in the Union Army during the American Civil War.
- Charles C. Butler (1865–1946), Chief Justice, Supreme Court of Colorado. Initiated in Union Lodge No. 7, Denver, on 27 April 1935.
- David Butler (1829–1891), first state governor of Nebraska. Affiliated with Pawnee Lodge No. 23 at Pawnee City in 1879. His original lodge is not known.
- Hugh A. Butler (1878–1954), U.S. senator from Nebraska. Raised in Wellsville Lodge No. 194, Wellsville, Missouri, and later became a member of St. John's Lodge No. 25 of Omaha.
- John Butler (1728–1796), Loyalist who led an irregular militia unit known as Butler's Rangers on the northern frontier in the American Revolutionary War. He was probably raised in Union Lodge No. 1, Albany, New York, and became the first secretary of the famous St. Patrick's Lodge No. 8 at Johnstown, New York, which first met on 23 August 1766. In Canada, after the war, he became a charter member of St. John's Lodge of Friendship No. 2 and served as its master. He became the first grand senior warden of the Provincial Grand Lodge of Upper Canada. Barton Lodge No. 6 (then 10) had many of his former rangers as members, and Brant himself was at one time a member of this lodge.
- Peter Butler, British politician. Member of Apollo University Lodge.
- Richard Butler (general) (1743–1791), officer in the Continental Army in the American Revolutionary War, who later died fighting Indians in Ohio. He was initiated in Lodge No. 2, Philadelphia, on 14 April 1779, passed 20 April and raised 27 April. He later affiliated with Pennsylvania-Union Lodge, a lodge of the Pennsylvania line, and on 9 January 1787 is recorded as having been admitted to Lodge No. 45 of Pittsburgh. Lodge records show that he visited St. George's Lodge of Schenectady, New York, in June 1779 and later American Union Lodge (military).
- William M. Butler (1861–1937), U.S. senator from Massachusetts. Received degrees in Star in the East Lodge of New Bedford, Massachusetts, in 1886.
- Billy Butlin, British philanthropist
- Isaac Butt (1813–1879), QC MP Irish barrister, politician, Member of Parliament. Member of Lodge No. 2, Dublin.
- George C. Butte (1877–1940), jurist, educator, and politician from Texas
- Daniel Butterfield, general of the Union Army during the American Civil War, Medal of Honor recipient and composer of the bugle call "Taps". Metropolitan Lodge No. 273, New York City.
- Sir Edward Buxton, 2nd Baronet (1812–1858), British politician. Member of Apollo University Lodge.
- Cyriel Buysse, Flemish nationalist writer
- Clovis E. Byers (1899–1973), U.S. Army lieutenant general who served in the Korean War and World War II. One-time commander of the 82nd Airborne. Received EA degree on 1 April 1923 in Laredo Lodge No. 547, Laredo, Texas, and the FC on 2 November 1925. Master Mason degree in Star of the East Lodge No. 650 in Yokohama, Japan, on 3 November 1947.
- George Byng, 6th Viscount Torrington (1768–1831), Royal Navy officer
- Harry C. "Curly" Byrd (1889–1970), president of the University of Maryland, College Park, from 1936 to 1954. Raised in Harmony Lodge No. 17, Washington, D.C., in 1914.
- Harry F. Byrd, governor of Virginia, U.S. senator from Virginia. Hiram Lodge No. 21, Winchester, Virginia.
- Richard E. Byrd, U.S. admiral. Initiated in Federal Lodge No. 1 and founded First Antarctic Lodge No. 777 in 1935.
- Frank M. Byrne (1858–1927), eighth governor of South Dakota
- James F. Byrnes, U.S. Supreme Court Associate Justice (1941–1942)
- Joseph W. Byrns Sr. (1869–1936), 46th Speaker of the United States House of Representatives. Member of Phoenix Lodge No. 131 and Cumberland Chapter No. 1, R.A.M. of Nashville, Tennessee.
- Joseph W. Byrns Jr. (1903–1973), one-term congressman from Tennessee. Member of Phoenix Lodge No. 131 of Nashville.
- John Byrom (1692–1763), FRS English poet and the inventor of a revolutionary system of shorthand. Listed as a member of a lodge held at The Swan in Long Acre, England, 1750.

== C ==
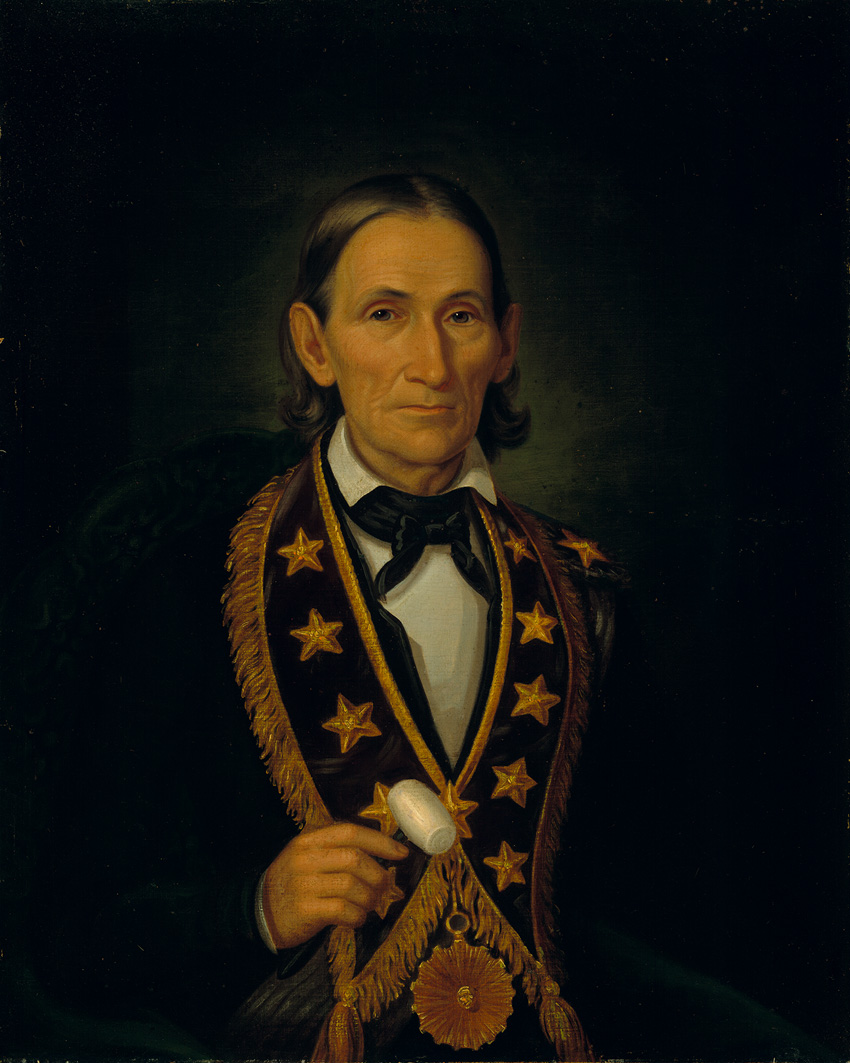
Thomas Claiborne in Masonic regalia by Washington Cooper

- William H. Cabell (1772–1853), 14th governor of Virginia. Member of George Lodge No. 32, Warminster, Virginia.
- John L. Cable (1884–1971), congressman from Ohio
- Charles Wakefield Cadman (1881–1946), American composer. Member of Albert Pike Lodge No. 484, Los Angeles.
- S. Parkes Cadman (1864–1936), English-born American clergyman, newspaper writer, and pioneer Christian radio broadcaster of the 1920s and 1930s. Member of Independent Royal Arch Lodge No. 2, New York City, and was Grand Chaplain of the Grand Lodge of New York for 28 years.
- John Cadwalader (1742–1786), commander of Pennsylvania troops during the American Revolutionary War. Member of Lodge No. 8 in Philadelphia.
- Thomas Cadwalader (c. 1707–1779), surgeon during the American Revolutionary War. Member of St. John's lodge of Philadelphia.
- Alessandro Cagliostro, Sicilian occultist
- 1st Viscount Caldecote (see Thomas Inskip, 1st Viscount Caldecote)
- William Musgrave Calder I (1869–1945), U.S. senator from New York
- Harmon White Caldwell (1899–1977), president of the University of Georgia in Athens from 1935 until 1948 and chancellor of the University System of Georgia from 1948 to 1964. Member of John W. Akin No. 537, Taylorsville, Georgia.
- Joseph Caldwell (1773–1835), first president of the University of North Carolina at Chapel Hill. Member of Eagle Lodge No. 19 of Hillsborough, North Carolina.
- Millard Fillmore Caldwell (1897–1984), congressman from and 29th governor of Florida. Member and past master of Santa Rosa Lodge No. 16, Milton, Florida, but was raised in a lodge in Macon, Mississippi.
- Richard Keith Call (1792–1862), third and fifth territorial governor of Florida. He joined Cumberland Lodge No. 8 at Nashville, Tennessee, in 1821 and later of Centerville Lodge No. 18, Leon County, Florida, of which he was master in 1851. In 1853 he affiliated with Concordia Lodge No. 28, Gadsden County, Florida. Assisted in the formation of the Grand Lodge of Florida in 1830 and was Grand Master in 1851.
- Plutarco Elías Calles (1877–1945), 40th president of Mexico. Member of Helios Lodge in Guaymas, Sonora.
- Jacques Calmanson (1722–1811), writer and physician
- Charles Alexandre de Calonne (1734–1802), French statesman. His lodge is not known, but he is recorded as a visitor to the Loge des Maitres at Amiens.
- Charles Calvert, 5th Baron Baltimore (1699–1751), British nobleman and Proprietary Governor of the Province of Maryland. Made a Mason about April, 1730 at Goodwood, West Sussex, England.
- Roberto Calvi (1920–1982), Italian banker and member of Propaganda Due, who was notable for his involvement with, and apparent suicide during, the Banco Ambrosiano scandal
- Ralph Henry Cameron (1863–1953), U.S. senator from Arizona. Member of Flagstaff Lodge No. 7, Flagstaff, Arizona.
- Simon Cameron (1799–1889), U.S. senator from Pennsylvania and 26th U.S. Secretary of War. Initiated in Perseverance Lodge No. 21 at Harrisburg, Pennsylvania, on 12 July 1826 and served as master in 1833.
- Albert Sidney Camp (1892–1954), congressman from Georgia
- Alexander William Campbell (1828–1893), Confederate States Army brigadier general during the American Civil War. Raised in Jackson, Tennessee, in June 1858 (lodge name and number not listed in Denslow).
- Archibald Campbell, 4th Baron Blythswood (1870–1929), British peer. Grand Master of the Grand Lodge of Scotland from 1926 to 1929.
- Doak S. Campbell (1888–1973), president of Florida State College for Women, as it made the transition from an all-female school under that name to the coeducational Florida State University, between 1941 and 1957. Raised in Buck Range Lodge, Howard County, Arkansas, and later a member of Jackson Lodge No. 1, Tallahassee, Florida. Served as grand orator of the Grand Lodge of Florida.
- Douglas Lloyd Campbell (1895–1995), 13th premier of Manitoba. He was initiated in Assiniboine Lodge No. 7 at Portage la Prairie, Manitoba, in 1917 and served as Master in 1922.
- George Washington Campbell (1769–1848), U.S. senator and congressman from Tennessee as well as ambassador to Russia and fifth Secretary of the Treasury. He served as master of Greenville Lodge No. 43, Greenville, Tennessee, and is also reported to have held offices in three other Tennessee lodges: Knoxville No. 2, Mount Libanus No. 59 and Tennessee No. 41, all of Knoxville.
- Jacob Miller Campbell (1821–1888), congressman from Pennsylvania and officer in the Union Army during the American Civil War. Became a member of Cambria Lodge No. 278 at Johnstown, Pennsylvania, on 26 October 1858, but demitted 13 April 1875 to become a charter member of Johnstown Lodge No. 538, serving as first senior warden.
- James Campbell (1812–1893), 16th U.S. Postmaster General. According to Denslow his blue lodge is not known, but he was a member of Harmony Chapter No. 52, Royal Arch Masons of Philadelphia.
- James Ulysses Campbell (1866–1937), 25th Chief Justice of the Oregon Supreme Court
- John Campbell, 2nd Marquess of Breadalbane, British politician, Member of Parliament (1820–1826, 1832–1834), Lord Chamberlain (1848–1852, 1853–1858), Grand Master of Scotland (1824–1826)
- John Campbell, 4th Earl of Loudoun (1705–1782), British peer and general of the British Army during the French and Indian War. Grand Master of the Grand Lodge of England in 1736. First Past Grand Master of England to visit a grand lodge in America, when on 31 January 1757 the Festival of St. John the Evangelist was postponed by the Provincial Grand Lodge in Boston so that he might attend.
- Sir Malcolm Campbell (1885–1948), MBE, British Army officer and racing motorist
- Thomas D. Campbell (1882–1966, industrialized corporate farming pioneer. Served as colonel with U.S. Air Corps from 1942 and made brigadier general in 1946. Raised in Acacia Lodge No. 4, Grand Forks, North Dakota, on 29 November 1907.
- Lord William Campbell (1730–1778), younger son of John Campbell, 4th Duke of Argyll. Colonial governor of both Nova Scotia (1766–1773) and South Carolina (1775).
- Sir William Campbell (1758–1834), Chief Justice of the Supreme Court of Upper Canada and a resident of Toronto. He was the founder of St. Andrew's Lodge No. 16 in Toronto.
- William Bowen Campbell (1807–1867), congressman from and 14th governor of Tennessee. Member of Lebanon Lodge No. 98, Lebanon, Tennessee.
- Joachim Heinrich Campe (1746–1818), German writer, linguist, educator and publisher. According to Denslow, "he was a learned and zealous Freemason as shown by his correspondence with Gotthold Lessing."
- Manuel Camus, Philippine senator. 12 October 1898, Zetland in the East Lodge No 508 Singapore, under the jurisdiction of the M. W. Grand Lodge of England.
- Edward Richard Sprigg Canby (1817–1873), career U.S. Army officer and a Union general in the American Civil War. According to Denslow he "was a member of a lodge in the East. His body was escorted under auspices of the Craft to the Masonic Temple at Yreka and afterwards conveyed East where he was buried with Masonic honors."
- Allen Daniel Candler (1834–1910), congressman from and 58th governor of Georgia. Member of Gainesville Lodge No. 219, Gainesville, Georgia.
- Rudolph C. Cane (1934-2024), member of the Maryland House of Delegates
- Gordon Canfield (1898–1972), congressman from New Jersey
- Ralph Canine (1895–1969), U.S. Army officer and first director of the National Security Agency (NSA). Raised in East Chicago Lodge No. 595, East Chicago, Indiana, in 1917.
- George Canning (1770–1827), Prime Minister of the United Kingdom from 10 April 1827 until his death. Member of Royal Somerset House and Inverness No. 4.
- Clarence Cannon (1879–1964), congressman from Missouri for over 40 years
- Joseph Gurney Cannon (1836–1926), 35th Speaker of the U.S. House of Representatives. Olive Branch Lodge No. 38 of Danville, Illinois.
- Newton Cannon (1781–1841), congressman from and eighth governor of Tennessee. Member of Cumberland Lodge No. 8, Nashville.
- Gheorghe Grigore Cantacuzino, prime minister of Romania
- James Cantey (1818–1874), Confederate States Army brigadier general during the American Civil War. Member of Kershaw Lodge No. 29, Camden, South Carolina.
- Eddie Cantor (c. 1892–1964), American "illustrated song" performer, comedian, dancer, singer, actor, and songwriter. Member of Munn Lodge No. 190, New York City.
- Homer Earl Capehart (1897–1979), U.S. senator from Indiana
- Luigi Capello (1859–1941), Italian Army officer during the First World War. According to Denslow, "Mussolini called on him to choose between Freemasonry and Fascism. He chose Freemasonry."
- William Theodotus Capers (1867–1867), bishop of the Episcopal Diocese of West Texas in the United States from 1914 until his death
- Arthur Capper (1865–1951), U.S. senator from and 20th governor of Kansas. Member of Orient Lodge No. 51 of Topeka.
- John Henry Capstick (1856–1918), congressman from New Jersey
- Emmanuel Carasso, Ottoman lawyer and politician, Grand Master of the Italian-rite Macedonia Risorta in Salonica
- Thaddeus Horatius Caraway (1871–1931), congressman and U.S. senator from Arkansas
- Ben Cardin (b. 1943), U.S. senator from Maryland
- Giosuè Carducci (1835–1907), Italian poet and recipient of the Nobel Prize in Literature. The Bulletin of the International Masonic Congress of 1917 lists him as a Freemason.
- Henry Charles Carey (1793–1879), leading 19th-century economist of the American School of capitalism. He was raised in Lodge No. 3, Philadelphia, on 21 January 1817.
- 1st Marquess of Carisbrooke See Alexander Mountbatten
- James Henry Carleton (1814–1873), Union general during the American Civil War. Raised in Montezuma Lodge No. 109 in New Mexico, chartered by the Grand Lodge of Missouri.
- Will Carleton (1845–1912), American poet
- Agostino Carlini (c. 1718–1790), Italian sculptor and painter, who was born in Genoa but settled in England. He was also one of the founding members of the Royal Academy in 1768. Member of the Lodge of Nine Muses No. 325 in London.
- Evans Carlson (1896–1947), U.S. Marine Corps brigadier general who served in both world wars
- Frank Carlson (1893–1987), congressman and senator from Kansas, and 38th governor of Kansas. Member of St. John's Lodge No. 113, Concordia, Kansas.
- George Alfred Carlson (1876–1926), 20th governor of Colorado
- Doyle Elam Carlton (1885–1972), 25th governor of Florida. Member of Hillsborough Lodge No. 25, Tampa.
- Carol II, King of Romania (1930–40)
- José Miguel Carrera, Chilean general and president St. John's Lodge No. 1, New York
- Charles Wynn-Carington, 1st Marquess of Lincolnshire, British politician, Member of Parliament (1865–1868), 1st Grand Master of New South Wales (1888–1891)
- Frank Carrington (1893–1975), co-founder in 1938 of the Paper Mill Playhouse in Millburn, New Jersey. Member of Hope Lodge No. 124, East Orange, New Jersey.
- Daniel Carroll (1730–1796), one of the Founding Fathers of the United States, and representative from Maryland in the 1st United States Congress. Member of Maryland Lodge No. 16, Baltimore.
- Thomas King Carroll (1793–873), 21st governor of Maryland. Member of both Washington Lodge No. 3 and Concordia Lodge No. 13, both of Baltimore.
- Arthur J. Carruth Jr. (1887–1962), leading newspaperman and civic leader in Kansas for more than five decades
- Henderson Haverfield Carson (1893–1971), congressman from Ohio. Raised 21 February 1928 in Lathrop Lodge No. 676, Canton, Ohio.
- Kit Carson, American adventurer. Montezuma Lodge No. 109, Santa Fe, New Mexico.
- William Leighton Carss (1865–1931), congressman from Minnesota
- Jesse F. Carter (1873–1943), member of the South Carolina Supreme Court
- Jesse W. Carter (1888–1959), member of the Supreme Court of California. Raised in Western Star Lodge No. 2, Shasta, California, in 1914, serving as master in 1922 and senior grand steward of the Grand Lodge of California in 1922.
- Julius Victor Carus (1823–1903), German zoologist, comparative anatomist and entomologist. The bulletin of the International Masonic Congress lists him as a Freemason.
- Elbert Nostrand "Bert" Carvel (1910–2005), 61st and 64th governor of Delaware. Raised in Hope Lodge No. 4, Laurel, Delaware.
- Glover H. Cary (1885–1936), congressman from Kentucky
- Thomas Casady (1881–1881), Episcopal bishop in Oklahoma
- Pedro "Peter" Casanave (c. 1766–1796), merchant and politician. As Master of Georgetown Lodge No. 9 of Maryland (now Potomac No. 5 of D.C.) he laid the cornerstone of the White House.
- Giacomo Casanova, Venetian adventurer, "lodge of the Duke of Clermont", Paris, 1750
- Paul Foster Case, founder of the Los Angeles occult school, the Builders of the Adytum, Fairport Lodge No. 476, Fairport, New York
- Lewis Cass, U.S. politician and diplomat. American Union Lodge No.1, Marietta, Ohio. First Grand Master of the Grand Lodge of Michigan.
- George Cassidy (jazz musician) (1936-2023), jazz musician and music teacher to Van Morrison
- Bruce L. Castor, Jr. (b. 1961), American lawyer and Republican politician from Montgomery County, Pennsylvania; acting Attorney General and first Solicitor General of Pennsylvania (2016). Raised 7 January 1992, Charity Lodge #190, Jeffersonville, Pennsylvania, 33rd Degree Scottish Rite (chosen at-large from PA), Knight Templar, Shriner A.A.O.N.M.S.
- Henry Cavendish, British scientist, best known for being the first to measure the density of the Earth, using the Cavendish experiment
- Ugo Cerletti, Italian neurologist
- Marc Chagall, Russian artist initiated in 1912
- Thomas Chalmers, Lodge St. Vigean, 1800
- Joshua Chamberlain, commander of Union forces on Little Round Top during the American Civil War Battle of Gettysburg, and governor of Maine. United Lodge #8, Brunswick, Maine.
- Nicolas Chamfort, French writer, Loge des Neuf Jr, Paris
- Charles XIII of Sweden, King of Sweden and Norway
- Sir James Charles Chatterton (1794–1874), veteran of the Peninsular War and the Battle of Quatre Bras and the Battle of Waterloo
- Claire Lee Chennault, U.S. Air Corps major general; Commander of the "Flying Tigers" in WWII. League City Lodge No. 1053, League City, Texas.
- Victor Child Villiers, 7th Earl of Jersey, British banker, politician and colonial administrator, Grand Master of New South Wales (1891–1893)
- Esmé Chinnery (1886–1915), English soldier, cricketer, and pioneering military aviator. Initiated in the Apollo University Lodge, Oxford.
- Walter Chrysler, founder of Chrysler Corporation
- Lord Randolph Churchill, Winston Churchill's father, initiated 9 January 1871 in Churchill Lodge
- Winston Churchill, Prime Minister of the United Kingdom; 24 May 1901, Studholme Alliance Lodge No. 1591
- André Citroën, French engineer and motor-car manufacturer, Lodge La Philosophie, Paris
- Thomas Claiborne (1780–1856), American politician
- Mark W. Clark, U.S. Army general, Mystic Tie Lodge No. 398, Indianapolis
- Roy Clark, country music entertainer, Jenk's Lodge #497 – Jenks, Oklahoma
- Tom C. Clark, Associate Justice of the U.S. Supreme Court (1949–1967)
- William Clark, explorer, Lewis and Clark expedition. Saint Louis Lodge No. 111.
- John H. Clarke, associate U.S. Supreme Court justice (1916–1922)
- H. G. Michael Clarke (1898–1978), British educator and clergyman. Royal Somerset House & Inverness Lodge No 4, Royal Alpha Lodge No 16, Provincial Grand Master (Warwickshire), and Third Grand Principal (Royal Arch).
- Henry Clay, speaker of the U.S. House of Representatives and Grand Master of Kentucky
- Moses Cleaveland, founded the city of Cleveland, Ohio. Worshipful Master of Moriah Lodge in 1791.
- Patrick Cleburne, Confederate general in the American Civil War. Lafayette Lodge No. 189, Helena, Arkansas.
- Samuel Langhorne Clemens, also known as Mark Twain. American author. Polar Star Lodge No. 79, A.F.& A.M., St. Louis, Missouri. (Suspended for non-payment of dues and later reinstated 24 April 1867. Demitted October 1867, but recorded as having visited Carson City Lodge U.D. in February and March 1868.)
- DeWitt Clinton, governor of New York state, Grand Master of New York during the Morgan Affair, Holland Lodge No. 8, New York, 1790
- E. E. Clive, British stage and screen actor; Euclid Lodge, Massachusetts
- Jim Clyburn, congressman from South Carolina
- Harold Coates, Australian politician. Grand Master of New South Wales (1980–1985).
- Tyrus "Ty" Cobb, baseball star. Royston Lodge No. 426, Detroit.
- Howard Coble (1931– ), member of the U.S. House of Representatives and Guilford Lodge number 656 AF&AM, Greensboro, North Carolina
- Mickey Cochrane, Baseball Hall of Famer
- Thomas Cochrane, 1st Baron Cochrane of Cults, British Unionist politician
- William F. Cody, a.k.a. Buffalo Bill, raised in Platte Valley Lodge No. 15, Nebraska
- George M. Cohan, Broadway star, raised in Pacific Lodge No. 233, New York City
- Francis Lyon Cohen, Chief Minister of the Great Synagogue in Sydney, Australia
- Harry Cohn, Pacific Lodge No. 233, New York
- Ernest E. Cole, Commissioner of Education of the State of New York (1940–1942)
- Nat King Cole, pianist and ballad singer
- Thomas Cole, English-born American artist, founder of Hudson River School. Amity Lodge No. 5, Zanesville, Ohio.
- Michael B. Coleman, American politician, mayor of Columbus, Ohio
- Neil Collings (1946–2010), English Anglican clergyman, and Dean of St Edmundsbury Cathedral. Earl of Mornington Lodge, London (UGLE), Grand Chaplain of UGLE, Third Grand Principal of Supreme Grand Chapter (Royal Arch) of England.
- Samuel Colt, manufacturer of Colt revolvers
- Émile Combes, French Prime Minister
- Spencer Compton, 7th Marquess of Northampton, Pro Grand Master, United Grand Lodge of England, 2001–2009
- Charlie Conacher, Canadian ice hockey player. Initiated in North Gate Lodge No. 591, Pickering, Ontario, in 1935.
- Marquis de Condorcet, French mathematician and philosopher, Lodges de Neuf Soeurs
- Chester Cooper Conklin (1886–1971), American comedian and actor. Raised 18 September 1916, University Lodge #394, California.
- Jess Conrad, entertainer, member of Chelsea Lodge No. 3098
- John Conyers Jr. (1929–2019), American politician of the Democratic Party who served as a congressman for Michigan from 1965 to 2017. The longest-serving African-American in congressional history. Raised in Unity Lodge No. 28, Prince Hall Affiliated in Detroit.
- John Cook, Union general in the American Civil War
- Joseph Cook, sixth prime minister of Australia Initiated into Lodge Independent No 8 UGLNSW 12 February 1892
- Gordon Cooper, U.S. astronaut, member of Carbondale Lodge No. 82, Colorado
- R. Clarke Cooper, U.S. diplomat, 19th Assistant Secretary of State for Political-Military Affairs, member of Apollo University Lodge No. 357, University of Oxford and Federal Lodge, No.1, Washington, D.C.
- Harry Corbett, puppeteer, magician, and pianist; creator of Sooty. Chevin Lodge, Yorkshire.
- Edward Henry Corbould (1815–1905), English artist
- Edward Cornwallis
- Count Richard von Coudenhove-Kalergi (1894–1972), Austro-Japanese political activist, founder of Paneuropean Union. Initiated: Humanitas Lodge, Vienna, 1922. Left Humanitas in 1926.
- Walter William Covey-Crump (1865–1949), English Anglican priest, prelate of the Order of the Red Cross of Constantine (1927), Assistant Grand Chaplain of England (before 1936).
- Edith Cowan, first woman elected to Australian Parliament; member of St Cuthberts Lodge, Perth (Le Droit Humain)
- James Craik, Physician General of the United States Army
- Todd E. Creason, American fiction and non-fiction writer. Ogden Lodge No. 754, Illinois.
- Douglas Crick, English clergyman and Bishop of Chester
- Philip Crick, English clergyman and Bishop of Ballarat (Australia)
- Francesco Crispi, Prime Minister of Italy (possibly expelled in 1894?)
- Miron Cristea, Patriarch of the Romanian Orthodox Church (1925–39), Prime Minister of Romania (1938–39)
- Davy Crockett, 19th-century American folk hero, frontiersman, soldier and politician
- Ben Cross, British actor known for portraying Harold Abrahams in Chariots of Fire, and Sarek in Star Trek; Shakespear Lodge No 99 (London), initiated 2010, Grand Steward (UGLE) 2017.
- Aleister Crowley, English occultist, Anglo-Saxon Lodge No. 343, Paris (GLdF), 1904
- Luigi Curcio, Philanthropist, friend of Manly P. Hall, Philadelphia, PA, December 6, 1933.
- Abraham Curry, founding father of Carson City, Nevada. Masonic Lodge No. 1, Carson City.
- Admiral of the Fleet Sir Lucius Curtis, Provincial Grand Master for the Province of Hampshire from 1840 until his death in 1869
- William Cushing, U.S. Supreme Court Associate Justice (1789–1810), St. Andrews Lodge, Boston
- Alexandru Ioan Cuza, Romanian Domnitor of the Danubian Principalities, 1859–66

== D ==
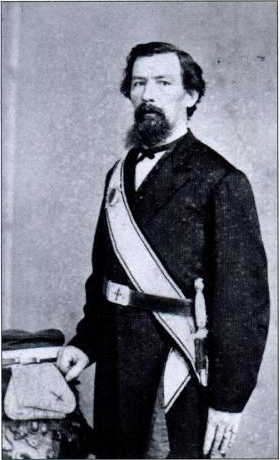
George Dickel in Masonic regalia by Carl Giers

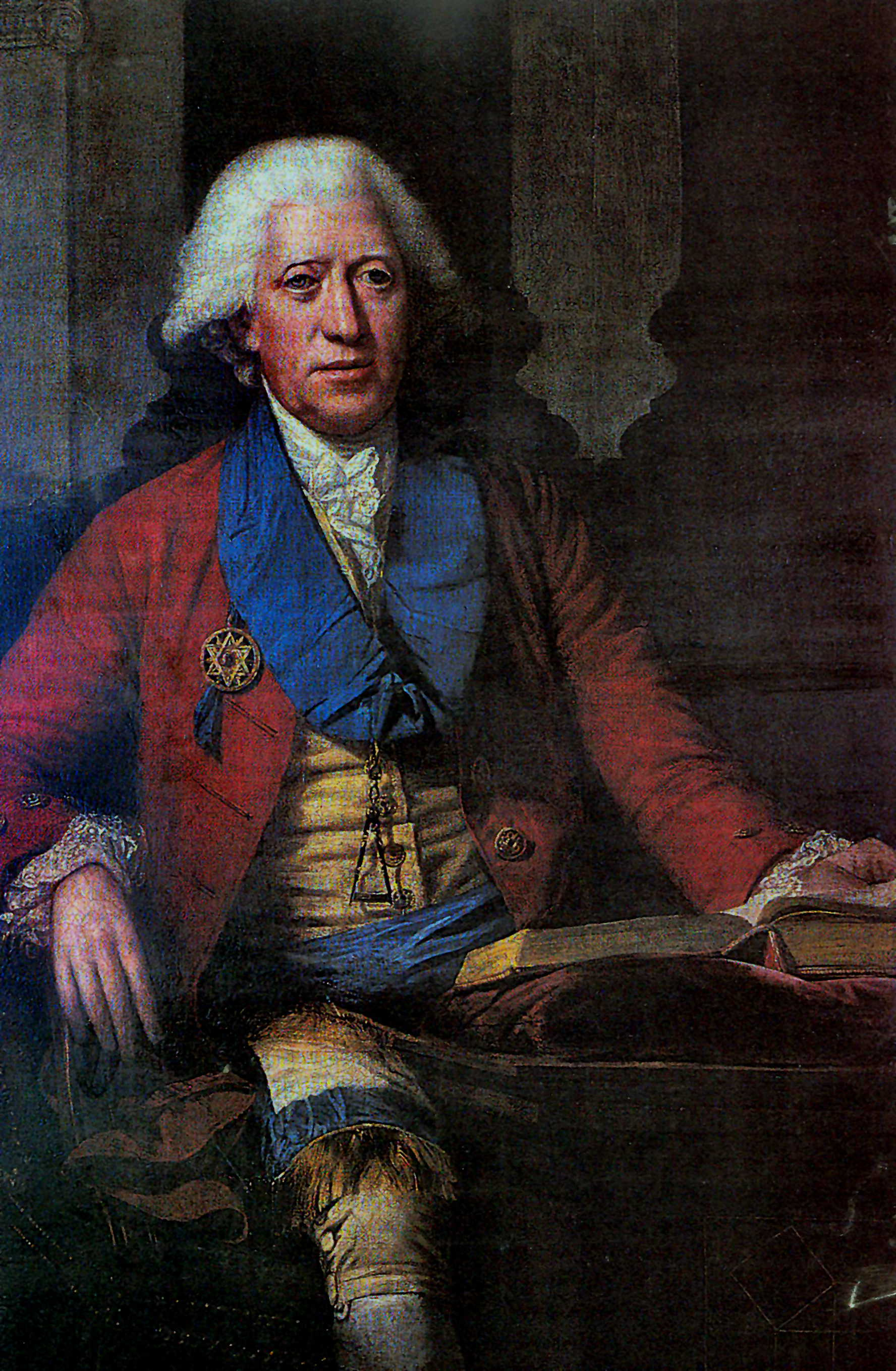
Thomas Dunckerley in Masonic regalia

- Mark Dalby, British clergyman, Deputy Grand Chaplain of UGLE
- Bakari P. Dale, US Army Senior Advisor for Artificial Intelligence & Data Science, Civilian Senior Executive, Veteran Naval Officer & Aviator, Council Lodge No. 778, F. & A.M, Birmingham, Ala, MWPHGL of Alabama.
- James Broun-Ramsay, 1st Marquess of Dalhousie, British politician and colonial administrator, Governor-General of India (1848–1856), Grand Master of Scotland (1836–1838)
- David Dalrymple, Lord Hailes, Scottish judge and historian, Grand Master of Scotland (1774–1776)
- Sir Charles Dalrymple, 1st Baronet, British politician, Member of Parliament (1868–1906), Grand Master of Scotland (1893–1897)
- Eugene Goblet d'Alviella, Vice-chancellor of the Université libre de Bruxelles and Belgian senator
- Charles Danby (1858–1906), actor, member of the Eccentric Lodge No. 2488
- William Darell (1878–1954), British Army commander, and rower. Assistant Grand Master of UGLE. Studholme Lodge No 1591 and many others.
- Erasmus Darwin, English physician, philosopher, poet, grandfather of Charles Darwin. Member of Canongate Kilwinning Lodge No. 2, Edinburgh, Scotland.
- Jim Davidson, British comedian, Chelsea Lodge No 3098, London; Founding Master of British Forces Foundation (Lodge) No. 9725.
- William Richardson Davie, American politician and Grand Master of North Carolina from 1792 to 1798
- Freddie Davies, British comedian and actor, Chelsea Lodge No 3098, London
- Carol Davila, Romanian physician
- Clarence "Tiger" Davis, American politician and member of the Maryland House of Delegates
- Norman Dawe, Canadian ice hockey and sports executive, member of the Elgin Lodge No. 7
- William Crosby Dawson, U.S. judge and politician, San Marino Lodge No. 34, F. & A.M, Greensboro, Georgia. Grand Master of Masons in Georgia from 1843 until his death in Greensboro on 6 May 1856.
- Charles De Coster, Belgian author
- Roger De Courcey, British ventriloquist, Chelsea Lodge No 3098, London
- Antonio De Curtis, also known as Totò, Italian actor. WM of Lodge Fulgor Artis, Rome.
- Isabelle Gatti de Gamond, pioneering Belgian secular educationalist and socialist activist
- Johann de Kalb, major general in the Continental Army during the American Revolutionary War. Pennsylvania Lodge No. 29.
- Polydore de Keyser, founding member and first Junior Warden, MacDonald Lodge, No. 1216
- Claude Joseph Rouget de Lisle, composer of "La Marseillaise"
- Sebastião de Melo, Marquis of Pombal, 18th-century Portuguese statesman
- William Ralph "Dixie" Dean, Everton and England footballer 1925–1937. Initiated in Randle Holme Lodge, No. 3261, Birkenhead, Cheshire, on 18 February 1931.
- Eugene V. Debs, American trade unionist, politician, and Socialist Party of America presidential candidate. Terre Haute Lodge No. 19.
- Ovide Decroly, Belgian educationalist. Initiated in Lodge Les Amis Philanthropes No. 2, Brussels, in 1902.
- Cecil B. DeMille, movie director; member of Prince of Orange Lodge No. 16, New York City
- Süleyman Demirel, 9th President of the Republic of Turkey. Bilgi Lodge No.015, Ankara. Grand Lodge of Turkey.
- Jack Dempsey, heavyweight boxing champion in 1919. Kenwood Lodge No. 800, Chicago.
- John Dennis (1931–2020), English clergyman; Bishop of St Edmundsbury & Ipswich. Rutlish Lodge No 4416 (London, then Surrey – lodge relocated).
- Laurence Dermott, painter, wine merchant and author. Grand Secretary, Ancients Grand Lodge, 1752–1771.
- John Theophilus Desaguliers, French-born British naturalist and scientist. Grand Master of the Premier Grand Lodge of England for the year 1719.
- Frédéric Desmons, Protestant priest who persuaded the Grand Orient de France to remove the term of the Great Architect of the Universe from their Constitution
- Willis Van Devanter, U.S. Supreme Court Associate Justice (1911–1937)
- Thomas E. Dewey, 47th governor of New York (1902–1971)
- Blaise Diagne, Senegalese political leader
- George Dickel (1818–1894), German-born American businessman
- Denver S. Dickerson, governor of Nevada
- Denis Diderot (1712–1784), French philosopher, writer and art critic
- John Diefenbaker, Prime Minister of Canada. Wakaw Lodge No. 166, Wakaw, Saskatchewan.
- Everett Dirksen, U.S. congressman and minority leader of the U.S. Senate
- Petar Dobrović, Serbian painter and politician
- Henry Dodge, U.S. senator from Wisconsin
- Bob Dole, U.S. politician Russell Lodge No. 177, Kansas
- Robert Dollar, Scottish-American industrialist and philanthropist
- Ed Doolan, Australian/British radio presenter
- James Doolittle, U.S. general. Hollenbeck Masonic Lodge #319, Los Angeles.
- Ray Dorset, British singer-songwriter, member of Mungo Jerry. Chelsea Lodge No. 3098.
- George Douglas, 16th Earl of Morton, Scottish politician, Lord High Commissioner (1819–1824). Grand Master of Scotland (1790–1792).
- Jim Douglas, governor of Vermont
- Stephen A. Douglas, U.S. senator, Lincoln–Douglas debates. Springfield Lodge No. 4, Grand Orator of Illinois Grand Lodge.
- Tommy Douglas, Canadian politician. Weyburn Lodge No. 20, Weyburn, Saskatchewan.
- William O. Douglas, U.S. Supreme Court Associate Justice (1939–1975)
- Alexander Douglas-Hamilton, 10th Duke of Hamilton, Scottish politician, Member of Parliament (1802–1806). Grand Master of Scotland (1820–1822).
- Hanson Dowell, Canadian ice hockey administrator and politician. Master at Ionic Lodge #73.
- Arthur Conan Doyle, British physician and author, creator of Sherlock Holmes
- Edwin Drake, U.S. oil industry pioneer. Oil Creek Lodge No. 3, Titusville, Pennsylvania.
- Francis Drake (antiquary), York doctor and historian. Grand Lodge of All England, York.
- Richard Dreyfuss, U.S. actor, made a Mason at Sight by the Grand Master of the Grand Lodge of the District of Columbia
- George Drummond, Scottish politician, Lord Provost of Edinburgh. Grand Master of Scotland (1752–1753).
- Gilbert du Motier, Marquis de Lafayette, French military officer who served as a general in the American Revolutionary War and a leader of the Garde Nationale during the French Revolution
- Juan Pablo Duarte, Dominican businessman, writer, political activist and ideological leader of the Dominican Republic's independence
- Jovan Dučić (1871–1943), Serbian poet, writer and diplomat
- George Dudley, Canadian ice hockey administrator and lawyer. Member of Caledonian Lodge 249.
- Robert Duff, British politician, Member of Parliament (1861–1893). Grand Master of New South Wales (1893–1895).
- Gerald du Maurier, actor and actor-manager. Green Room Lodge No. 2957, London (UGLE).
- Henry Dunant, founder of the Red Cross; shared the first Nobel Prize
- Thomas Dunckerley, ritualist and author, Lodge No 31, Portsmouth
- Lawrence Dundas, 1st Earl of Zetland
- Thomas Dundas, 2nd Earl of Zetland, Grand Master of Grand Lodge of England, 1844–70. Initiated in Prince of Wales' Lodge No. 259 in 1830.
- Colonel Sir Weary Dunlop (1907–1993), Australian World War II prisoner of war, surgeon
- John Boyd Dunlop, Scottish inventor
- Alexander Roberts Dunn, first Canadian awarded the Victoria Cross
- Jimmy Dunn, Canadian sports executive and Hockey Hall of Fame inductee
- Herbert Dunnico, UK politician and Master of the New Welcome Lodge
- John Ward Dunsmore, American painter of Puritan Lodge No. 185, New Jersey.
- George F. Durand (1850–1889), Canadian architect, Tuscan Lodge 195
- Joseph Duveen, 1st Baron Duveen, UK art dealer. Royal Colonial Institute Lodge No. 3556.

== See also ==
- List of Freemasons (E–Z)
