= Warminster, Virginia =

Unincorporated community in Virginia, US

Coordinates: 37°41′15″N 78°41′52″W

Warminster is an unincorporated community in Nelson County, Virginia, United States.
