= Hillcrest Park (disambiguation) =

Hillcrest Park is a public park in Vancouver, British Columbia.

Hillcrest Park may also refer to:

- Hillcrest Park (Fullerton), a park in Fullerton, California
- Hillcrest Park (Thunder Bay), a park in Thunder Bay, Ontario

== See also ==
- Hillcrest Park Archway, an archway in Clovis, New Mexico
- Hillcrest Park Cemetery, a cemetery in Springfield, Massachusetts
