= Nat Bailey Stadium =

Baseball stadium in Vancouver

Rogers Field at Nat Bailey Stadium
- The Nat

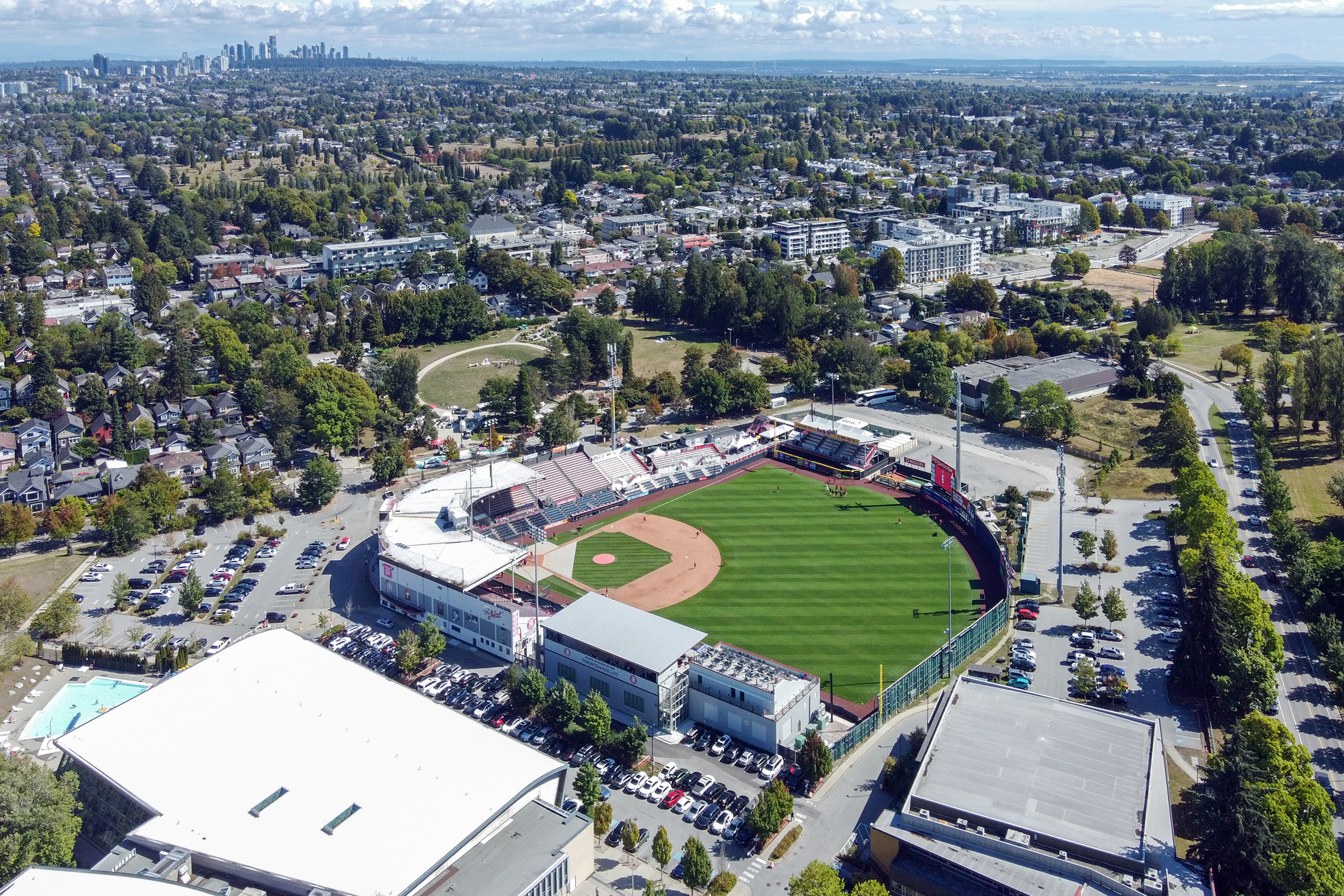
- Aerial view of the Nat Bailey Stadium in 2026

- Location within British Columbia Location within Canada
- Interactive map of Rogers Field at Nat Bailey Stadium
- Former names: Capilano Stadium (1951–1978); Nat Bailey Stadium (1978–2009, 2021–2022); Scotiabank Field at Nat Bailey Stadium (2010–2020)
- Address: 4601 Ontario Street; Vancouver, British Columbia V5V 3H4; Canada
- Coordinates: 49.2431°N 123.1063°W
- Owner: City of Vancouver
- Operator: City of Vancouver
- Capacity: 6,500
- Surface: Grass
- Field size: Left field: 320 ft (98 m); Centre field: 385 ft (117 m); Right field: 330 ft (100 m); Backstop: 30 ft (9 m)

Construction
- Groundbreaking: 1951
- Opened: July 15, 1951
- Renovated: 2024-2026
- Cost: C$550,000 ($6.54 million in 2025 $20 million (2024-2026 renovations)
- Architect: William Aitken

Tenants
- Vancouver Capilanos (WIL) 1951–1954; Vancouver Mounties (PCL) 1956–1962, 1965–1969; Vancouver Canadians (PCL) 1978–1999; UBC Thunderbirds (NAIA) 2000–2010; Vancouver Canadians (NWL) 2000–2019, 2022–present

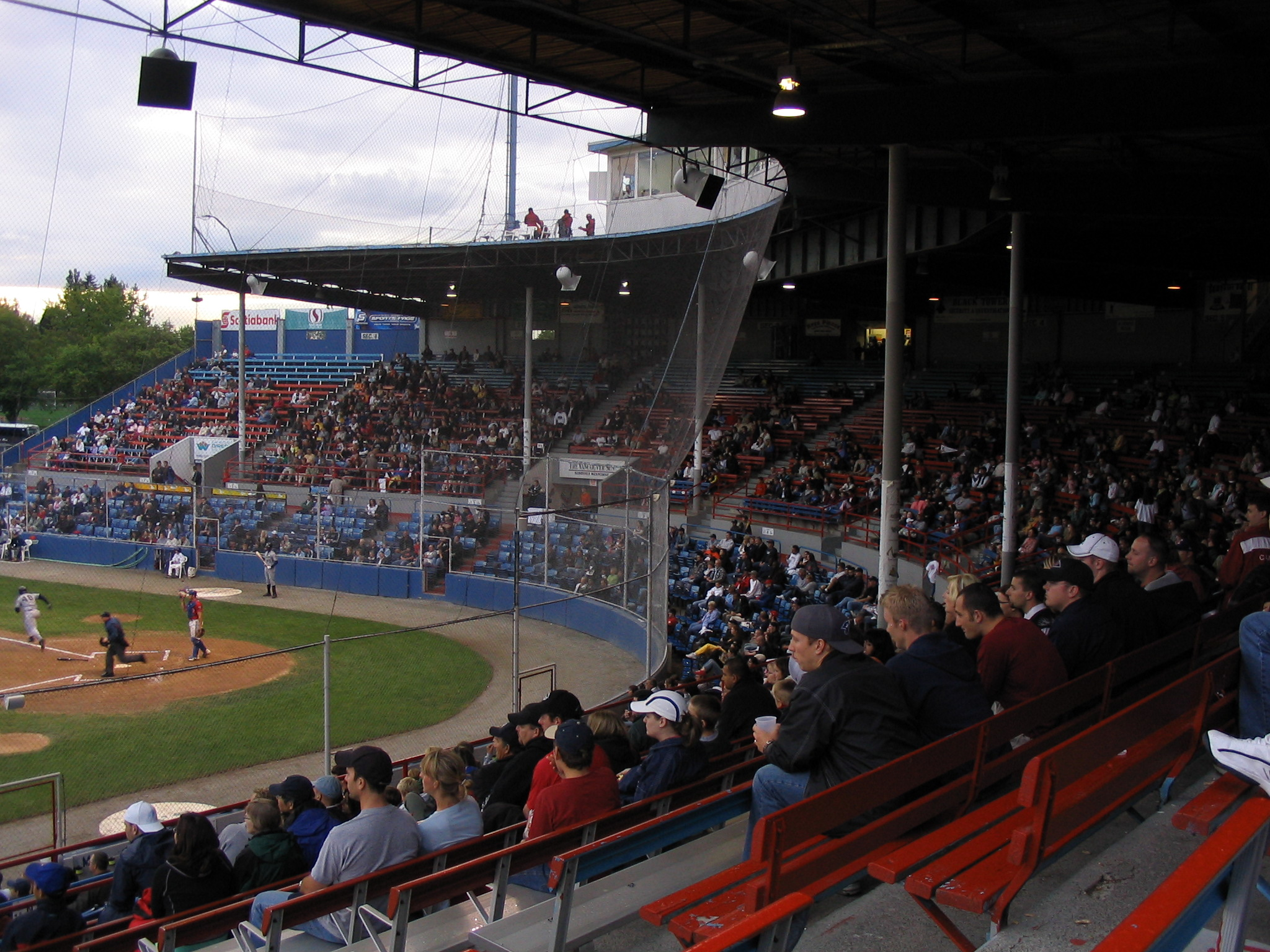
The grandstand at Nat Bailey Stadium

Rogers Field at Nat Bailey Stadium, also known as The Nat, is a baseball stadium in western Canada, located in Vancouver, British Columbia. It is home to the Vancouver Canadians of the High-A classification Northwest League.

== Stadium history ==
The stadium is located in Hillcrest Park immediately north-east of Queen Elizabeth Park in the Riley Park neighbourhood of Vancouver. It replaced Athletic Park, which had opened in 1913. Originally built in 1951 as Capilano Stadium, it was posthumously renamed Nat Bailey Stadium in 1978 for Vancouver restaurateur (and founder of the White Spot restaurant chain) Nat Bailey to honour his effort to promote baseball in Vancouver. On June 16, 2010, Scotiabank and the Vancouver Canadians announced a naming rights agreement that led to the name Scotiabank Field at Nat Bailey Stadium until that agreement ended in 2019 and the stadium reverted to its prior name.

The stadium was first home to the Vancouver Capilanos in the early 1950s and later attracted the Oakland Oaks, who became the Vancouver Mounties of the Triple-A classification Pacific Coast League (PCL) from 1956 to 1962 and 1965 through 1969. The PCL returned to Vancouver in 1978 with the Vancouver Canadians, owned by Harry Ornest. He purchased most of the primary assets of Sick's Stadium in Seattle and shipped them north for use at Nat Bailey. The Canadians stayed in Vancouver through the 1999 season, then relocated south to Sacramento, California, as the Sacramento River Cats. The following season, a second incarnation of the Canadians began playing in the Class A Short Season Northwest League. In 2021, they were elevated to the High-A classification.

The stadium's seating capacity is 6,500. In 2019, the Canadians led their classification in attendance and outdrew Vancouver's former Triple-A team.

Canadians ownership signed a long-term lease at Scotiabank Field at Nat Bailey Stadium in February 2007. They significantly improved and modernized the stadium while also restoring parts of the park to its original 1951 condition.

In April 2023, team officials announced that Rogers Communications had acquired the naming rights to the stadium in an agreement through the 2027 season. The stadium was then renamed to Rogers Field at Nat Bailey Stadium.

=== Renovations ===
In March 2024, the Vancouver Canadians announced a $20-million, two-phase, mandatory renovation plan for the seven-decade-old stadium which included the construction of new modern clubhouses for the home and visiting team, improved training facilities such as new batting cages and a spectator grandstand to replace the BBQ area. The renovations broke ground after the conclusion of the 2024 season and occurred during the 2025 and 2026 off-seasons. The refurbishment project was completed after two years shortly before the Canadians' 2026 season and the efforts were well praised by representatives sent by Major League Baseball's head office to assess the stadium's conditions and the Canadians' General Manager Allan Bailey.

== Bud Kerr Baseball Museum ==
The Bud Kerr Baseball Museum is located inside Nat Bailey Stadium within the stadium concourse along the third base side. The museum, which opened on June 18, 2008, is dedicated to the more than 75 years of baseball that have been played in the stadium. The museum is named for Bud Kerr, the team's official historian until his death in 2009, and celebrates the players who have spent part of their careers there, including Rich Harden, Sammy Sosa, and Baseball Hall of Fame inductee Tim Raines, who helped open the museum.

== In fiction ==
The stadium was used as the home of the fictional Santa Barbara Seabirds Class A minor league team in the "Dead Man's Curveball" episode of the television series Psych. It was also used as the home of the fictional Seacouver Chiefs in the "Manhunt" episode of Highlander: The Series. Additionally, it was the setting for a scene between MacGyver and Reggie Jackson in the MacGyver episode "Squeeze Play".
