= Coverage (telecommunication) =

Radio station feature

In telecommunications, the coverage of a radio station is the geographic area where the station can communicate. Coverage depends on several factors, such as orography (i.e. mountains) and buildings, technology, radio frequency and perhaps most importantly for two-way telecommunications the sensitivity and transmit efficiency of the consumer equipment. Some frequencies provide better regional coverage, while other frequencies penetrate better through obstacles, such as buildings in cities.

The ability of a mobile phone to connect to a base station depends on the strength of the signal. That may be boosted by higher power transmissions, better antennas, taller antenna masts or alternative solutions like in-building picocells. Normal Macro-Cell signals need to be boosted to pass through buildings, which is a particular problem designing networks for large metropolitan areas with modern skyscrapers, hence the current drive for small cells and micro and pico cells. Signals also do not travel deep underground, so specialized transmission solutions are used to deliver mobile phone coverage into areas such as underground parking garages and subway trains.

Broadcasters and telecommunications companies frequently produce coverage maps to indicate to users the station's intended coverage area (also known as their service area).

== Coverage noticer ==
A coverage noticer is a device that beeps (or vibrates) when in a zone that lacks coverage (white spot). This is fundamental for critical services (security, emergency and so on). When the user goes to a covered area, the noticer ceases beeping. Similarly coverage maps are often used to visualize coverage, these are produced by networks themselves as well as independent companies.

Coverage noticers can be integrated in a mobile phone also and several apps exist to show coverage maps on devices, including OpenSignal.

== See also ==
- Femtocell
- Footprint (satellite)
- Mobile phone
- Mobile computing
- Pass (spaceflight)
- Roaming
- Service contour
- Telecommunications network
- White spot
- Wireless
