= White spot =

White Spot is a Canadian restaurant chain.

White spot may also refer to:

== Disease ==
- Ichthyophthirius multifiliis, freshwater fish parasite, the disease it causes is often called white spot
- Cryptocaryon irritans, marine fish parasite, also referred to as white spot
- White spot syndrome a viral infection of penaeid shrimp

== Animals ==
- Aplocheilus panchax, the whitespot, a common freshwater fish, native to South and Southeast Asia
- Hadena albimacula, the white spot, a European moth
- Hypagyrtis unipunctata, the one-spotted variant moth or white spot, an American and Eurasian moth

== Other uses ==
- Great White Spot, periodic storms on the surface of Saturn, visible by telescope from Earth
- Stachys sylvatica, a plant native to Europe and Asia
- "White Spot of America," a marketing slogan promoted by the Greater Los Angeles Association
