= Riley Park, Vancouver =

Coordinates: 49.2394°N 123.1035°W

Riley Park
- Neighbourhood
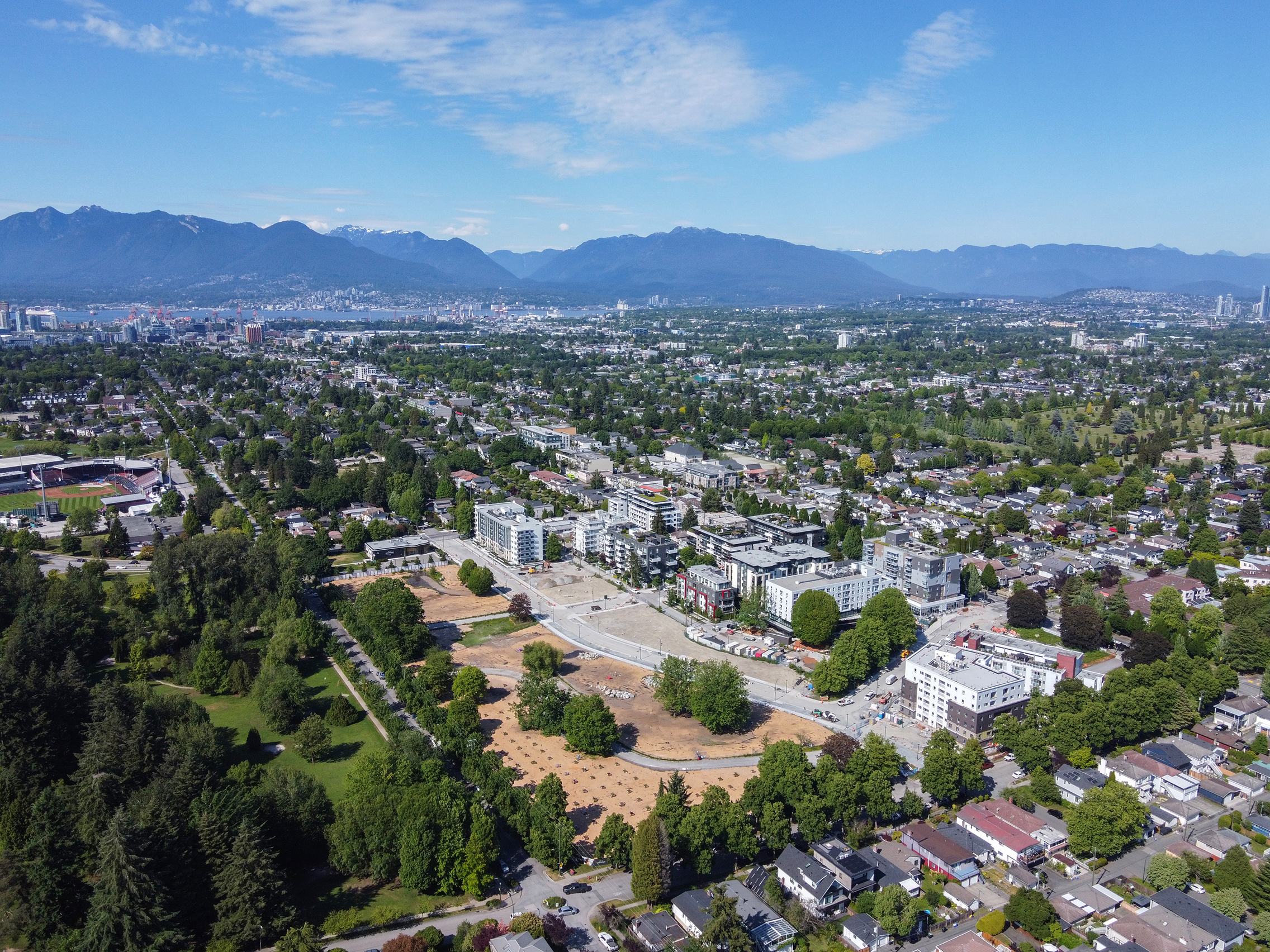
- Aerial view of Riley Park–Little Mountain in 2026

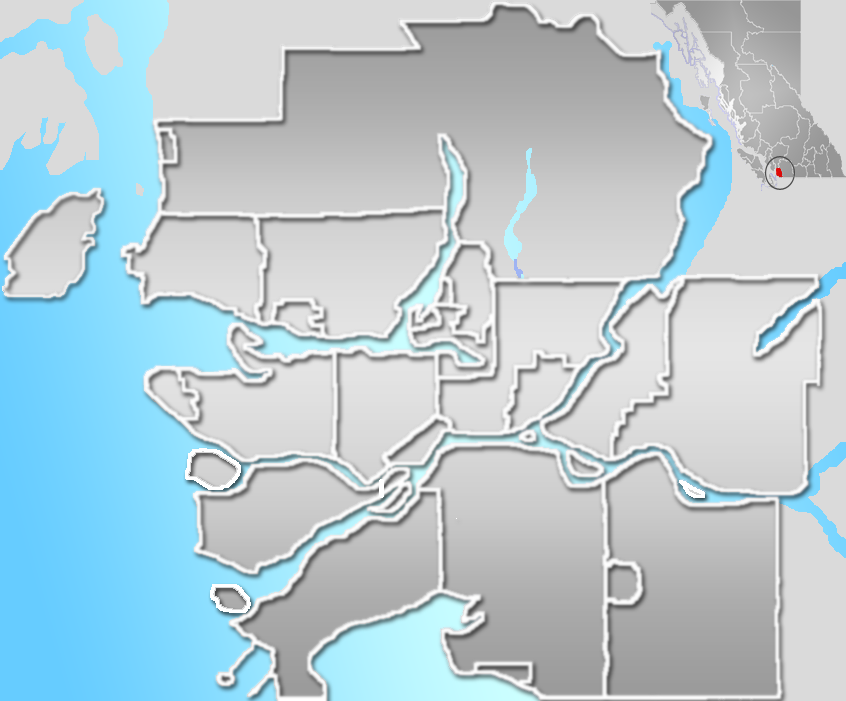
- Location in Vancouver
- Country: Canada
- Province: British Columbia
- City: Vancouver

Population (2016)
  - Total: 22,555
- Website: https://vancouver.ca/news-calendar/riley-park.aspx

Riley Park, sometimes also known as Riley Park–Little Mountain, is a neighbourhood in Vancouver, British Columbia. Its boundaries are 41st Avenue to the south, 16th Avenue to the north, Cambie Street to the west, and Fraser Street to the east. The main commercial thoroughfare of the neighbourhood is Main Street.

== Demographics ==
Panethnic groups in the Riley Park in neighbourhood (2001−2016)
Panethnic group	2016		2006		2001	
Panethnic group	Pop.	%	Pop.	%	Pop.	%
European (Note: Statistic includes all persons that did not make up part of a visible minority or an indigenous identity.)	12,090	54.06%	10,950	50.6%	9,940	45.55%
East Asian (Note: Statistic includes total responses of "Chinese", "Korean", and "Japanese" under visible minority section on census.)	5,775	25.82%	6,235	28.81%	7,300	33.46%
Southeast Asian (Note: Statistic includes total responses of "Filipino" and "Southeast Asian" under visible minority section on census.)	2,135	9.55%	2,415	11.16%	2,275	10.43%
South Asian	1,080	4.83%	810	3.74%	980	4.49%
Indigenous	420	1.88%	255	1.18%	415	1.9%
Latin American	175	0.78%	180	0.83%	335	1.54%
Middle Eastern (Note: Statistic includes total responses of "West Asian" and "Arab" under visible minority section on census.)	160	0.72%	145	0.67%	115	0.53%
African	105	0.47%	190	0.88%	195	0.89%
Other/Multiracial (Note: Statistic includes total responses of "Visible minority, n.i.e." and "Multiple visible minorities" under visible minority section on census.)	425	1.9%	460	2.13%	275	1.26%
Total responses	22,365	99.16%	21,640	99.2%	21,820	99.23%
Total population	22,555	100%	21,815	100%	21,990	100%
Note: Totals greater than 100% due to multiple origin responses

== Parks ==
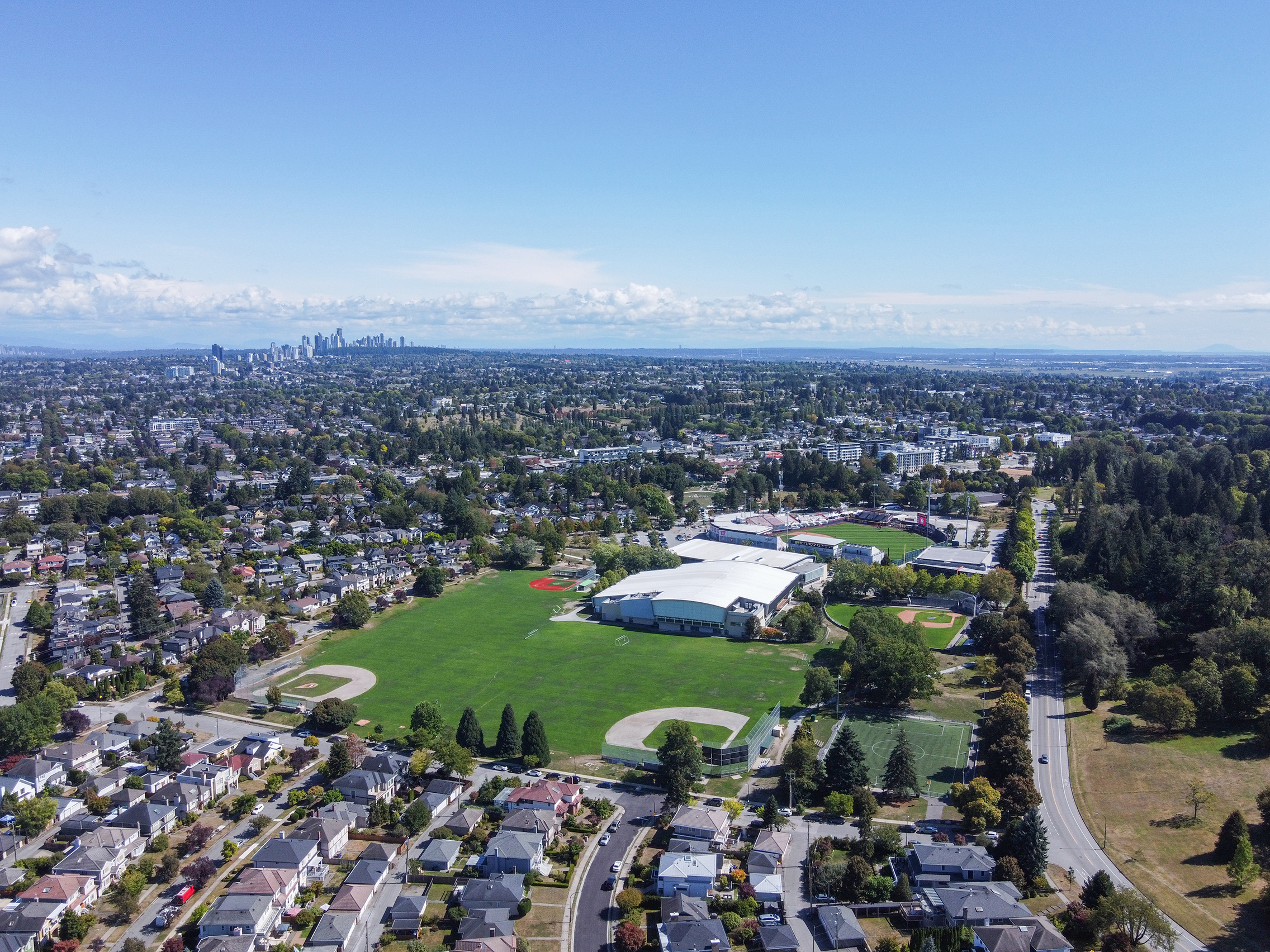
Hillcrest Park

Little Mountain is the former name of a quarry located at what is now Queen Elizabeth Park. The quarry garden at the park is one of the most popular places in Vancouver. There is a pitch and putt and a disc golf course at Queen Elizabeth Park, as well as the Seasons In The Park restaurant.

Hillcrest Park is a park to the north-east of Queen Elizabeth Park, with Hillcrest Community Centre located in the park. The park includes an aquatic centre, fitness centre, ice rink, gymnasium, indoor cycling, multi-purpose rooms, a games room, dance studio, playgrounds, childcare centre, and a Blue Parrot Coffee.

== Sports ==
Nat Bailey Stadium is a baseball stadium used by the Vancouver Canadians, a Minor League Baseball team. Nat Bailey Stadium was originally named Capilano Stadium, before being renamed in honour of Nat Bailey.

In the north-east corner of Hillcrest Park is a baseball diamond which is the headquarters of Little Mountain Baseball Little League.

== See also ==
- Hillcrest Park, a park in Riley Park
