= Art Savage =

- Born: July 3, 1951; Amarillo, Texas, U.S.
- Died: November 21, 2009 (aged 58)
- Education: Texas Tech University
- Occupations: President & CEO of the San Jose Sharks
- Spouse: Susan Savage
- Children: 2 sons

Art Savage (July 3, 1951 – November 21, 2009) was an American sports executive who was president and chief executive officer of the San Jose Sharks of the National Hockey League from 1990 until 1997 and majority owner of the Sacramento River Cats of the Triple-A Pacific Coast League from 1999 until his death in 2009. Savage acquired the Vancouver Canadians which were based in British Columbia, and soon afterwards moved the team to Sacramento, California.

Savage was born in Amarillo, Texas; he died of lung cancer on November 21, 2009. His son Jeff said that his family would retain control of the team.
