= Hillcrest Park Archway =

- U.S. National Register of Historic Places
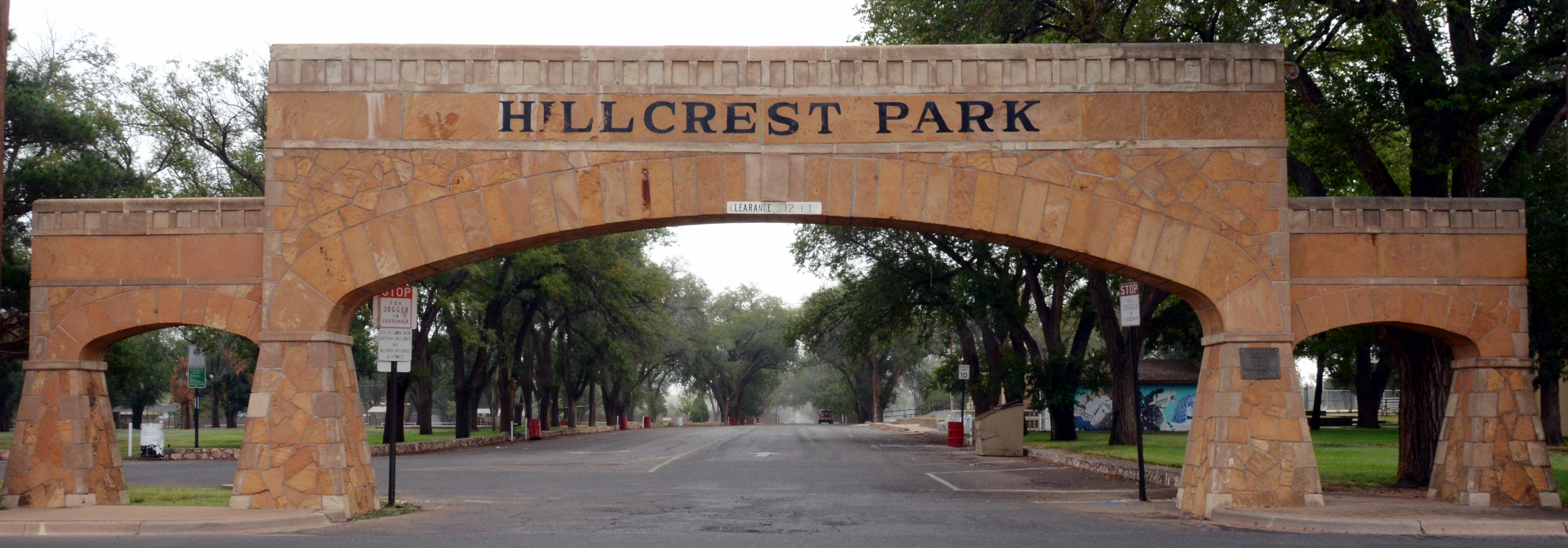

- Location within New Mexico Location within the United States
- Location: Off Sycamore Street, near intersection of East 10th and Sycamore St, Clovis, New Mexico
- Coordinates: 34°24′35″N 103°11′16″W
- Area: less than one acre
- Built: 1939
- Built by: Works Progress Administration
- MPS: New Deal in New Mexico MPS
- NRHP reference No.: 08000573
- Added to NRHP: July 2, 2008

The Hillcrest Park Archway in Clovis, New Mexico is an archway over a roadway entering Hillcrest Park which was built from 1939 to 1940. It was a Works Progress Administration project. It was listed on the National Register of Historic Places in 2008.

"Improved by the Works Progress Administration" and "1935" show on a photographed plaque on the archway; it seems that date refers to WPA improvements to the Hillcrest Park, not the archway itself.
