= John Garand =

Canadian-American firearm designer (1888–1974)

John C. Garand
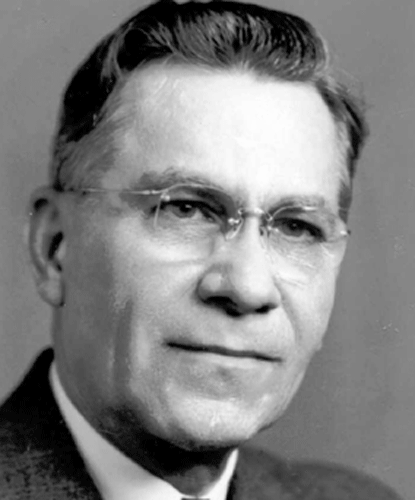
- Born: Jean Cantius Garand; January 1, 1888; St. Rémi, Quebec, Canada
- Died: February 16, 1974 (aged 86); Springfield, Massachusetts, U.S.
- Occupations: Designer; engineer
- Years active: 1917–1953
- Employer: Springfield Armory
- Known for: First successful semi-automatic rifle adopted as a primary service rifle by a major military power
- Notable work: United States Rifle, Caliber .30, M1 (M1 Garand)
- Spouse: Nellie Bruce Shepard (m. 1930)
- Children: 3
- Awards: Meritorious Civilian Service Award (1941); Medal for Merit (1944)

Jean Cantius Garand (/ˈɡærənd/ GARR-ənd, French: [ʒɑ̃ ɡaʁɑ̃]; January 1, 1888 – February 16, 1974), also known as John C. Garand, was a Canadian-American designer of firearms who created the M1 Garand, a semi-automatic rifle that was widely used by the U.S. Army and U.S. Marine Corps during World War II and the Korean War.

== Early life ==
Garand was one of twelve children, six boys and six girls, born on a farm near St. Rémi, Quebec. His father moved to Jewett City, Connecticut, with the children when their mother died in 1899. All of the boys had the first name St. Jean le Baptiste, but only he went by the first name John. The other boys went by their middle names. Several of his brothers were also inventors. The children worked in a textile mill where John learned to speak English while sweeping floors. John became interested in guns and learned to shoot after working at a shooting gallery.

John learned machinist skills while working at the textile mill, and was hired by Browne and Sharpe, a Providence, Rhode Island, toolmaking company in 1909. In 1916, he found employment with a New York toolmaking firm, and resumed rifle practice at the shooting galleries along Broadway. In 1920, Garand became a naturalized United States citizen.

Pronunciation of the name "Garand" has differed, pronounced as /ɡəˈrænd/ gə-RAND or /ˈɡærənd/ GARR-ənd. Descendants of John Garand and his close friend General Julian Hatcher generally agree with the latter, rhyming approximately with 'errand'.

== Designer of firearms ==
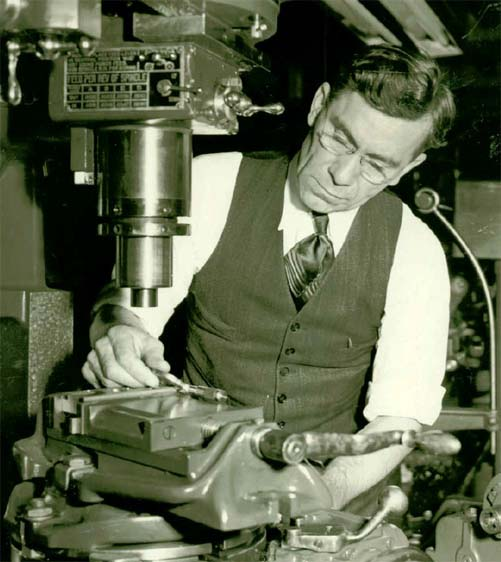
Garand at Springfield Armory

Garand's fondness for machinery and target shooting blended naturally into a hobby of designing guns, which took a more vocational turn in 1917. That year the United States Army took bids on designs for a light machine gun, and Garand's design was eventually selected by the War Department. Garand was appointed to a position with the United States Bureau of Standards in Washington D.C., with the task of perfecting the weapon. The first model was built in 1919, too late for use in World War I, but the government employed Garand as an engineer at the Springfield Armory from November 4, 1919 until he retired in 1953.

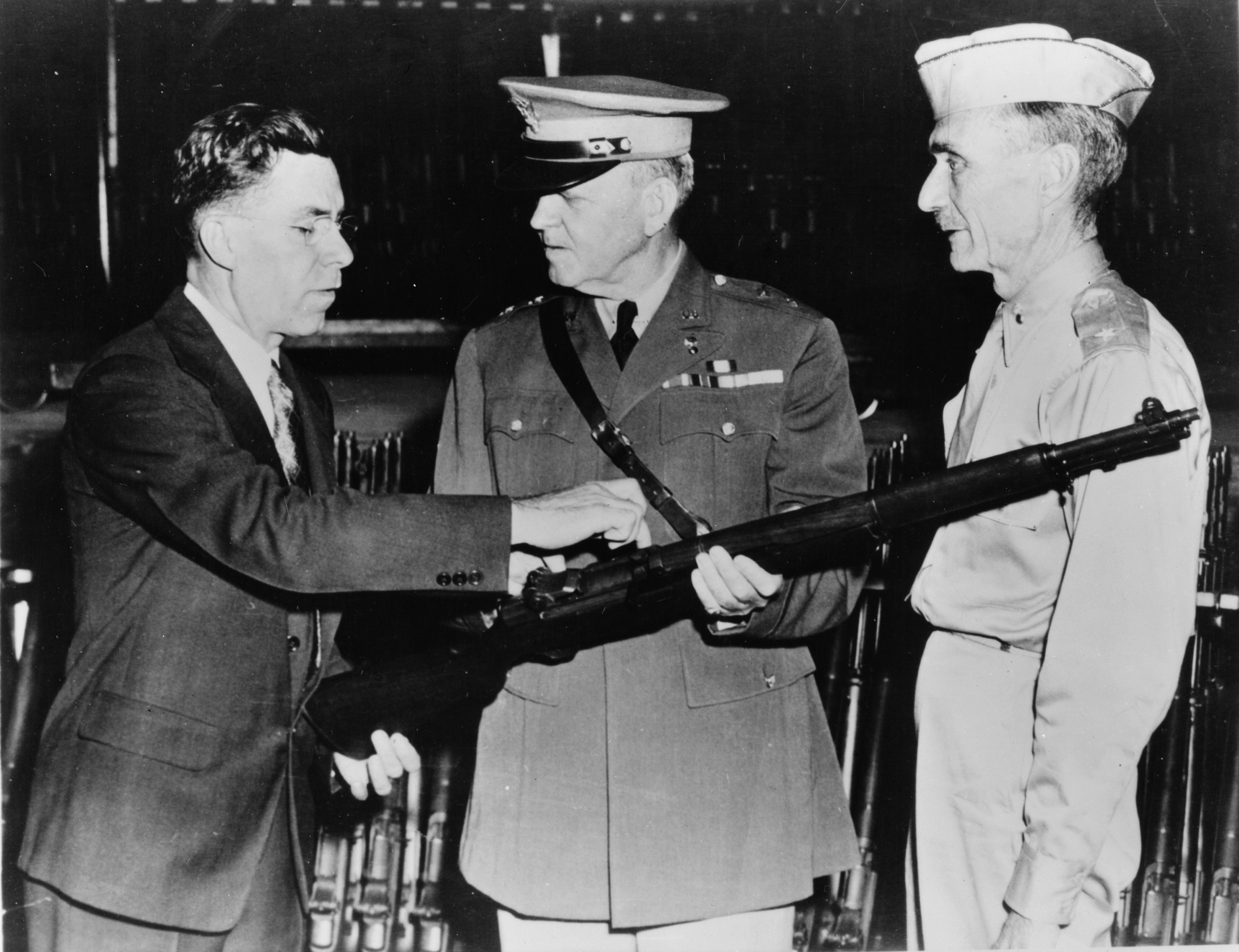
Garand points out features of his M1 Rifle to general Charles M. Wesson, the U.S. Army Chief of Ordnance.

In Springfield, Massachusetts, Garand was tasked with designing a basic gas-actuated self-loading infantry rifle and carbine that would eject the spent cartridge and reload a new round using a gas-operated system. Designing a rifle that was practical in terms of effectiveness, reliability, and production, stretched over time; it took fifteen years to perfect the M1 prototype model to meet all the U.S. Army specifications.

The resulting Semiautomatic, Caliber .30, M1 Rifle was patented by Garand in 1932, approved by the U.S. Army on January 9, 1936, and went into mass production in 1940. It replaced the bolt-action M1903 Springfield and became the standard infantry rifle known as the Garand Rifle. During World War II, over four million M1 rifles were manufactured. The Garand Rifle proved to be an effective and reliable weapon and was praised by General MacArthur. General Patton wrote, "In my opinion, the M1 rifle is the greatest battle implement ever devised."

In the late 1940s and early 1950s, Garand designed and built a prototype bullpup rifle. It fired the same cartridge as the M1, but the magazine, action and shape were completely different. It was a select-fire design, and had a firing rate of about 600rpm. When Garand retired in 1953, the second version of the T31 was incomplete. The project was scrapped, and the prototype was retired to the Springfield Armory museum in 1961.

Garand never received any royalties from his M1 rifle design despite over six and a half million M1 rifles being manufactured as he transferred all rights regarding his inventions to the U.S. in January 1936. A bill was introduced in Congress to award him $100,000 in appreciation, but it did not pass. Garand remained in his consulting position with the Springfield Armory until his retirement in 1953.

== Personal life and death ==
Garand married English Canadian widow Nellie Bruce Shepard (August 3, 1900 – February 25, 1986) on September 6, 1930, in Albany, New York. She had two daughters by her previous marriage, and they had a daughter and a son of their own.

Garand died in Springfield, Massachusetts, on February 16, 1974, and was buried at Hillcrest Park Cemetery there.

== Recognition ==
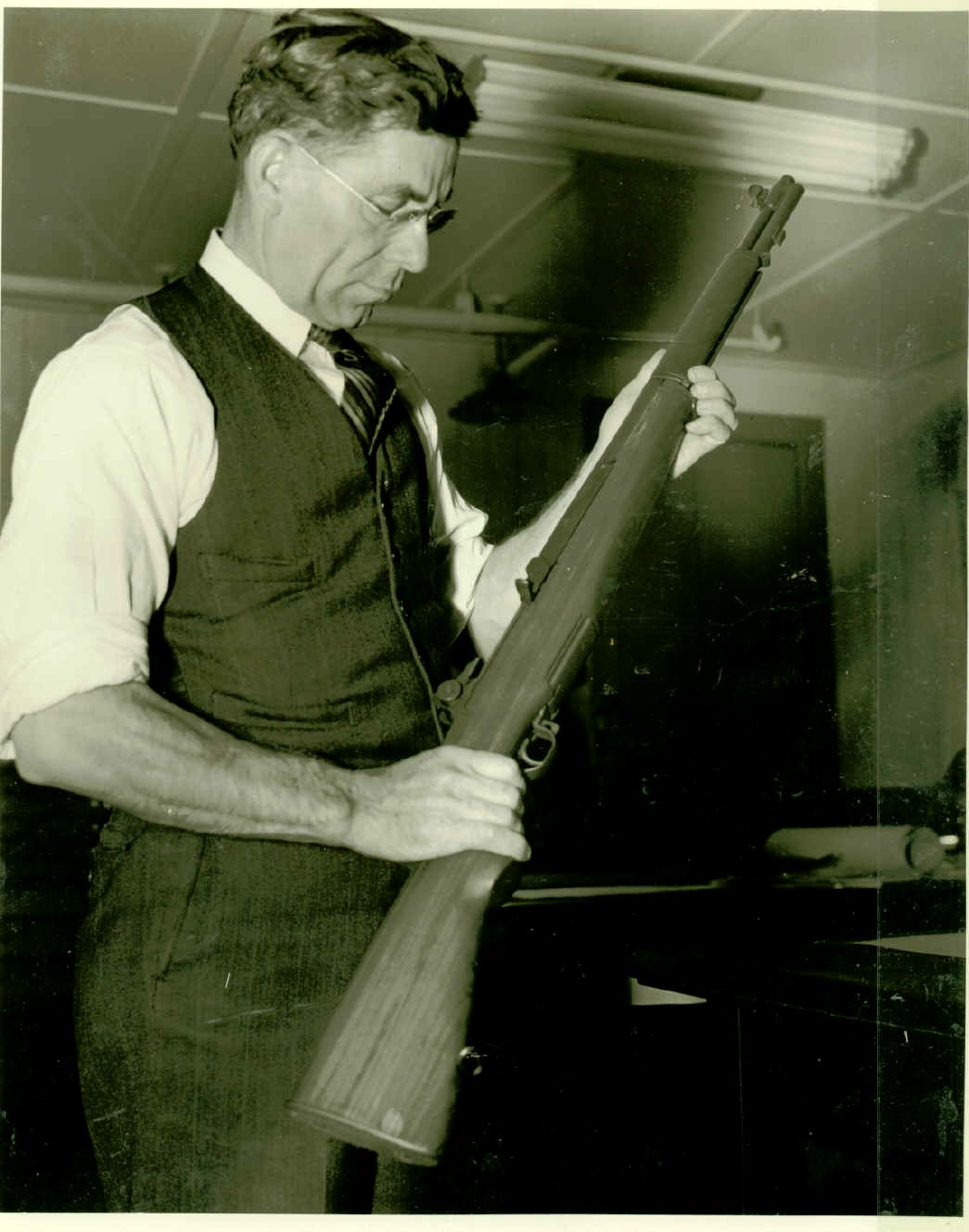
Garand and the M1

For his work with the Springfield Armory, Garand was awarded the Meritorious Civilian Service Award in 1941, the Alexander L. Holley Medal from the American Society of Mechanical Engineers, and the first Medal for Merit, together with Albert Hoyt Taylor, on March 28, 1944.

In 1973, Garand was inducted into the U.S. Army Ordnance Corps Hall of Fame for designing the M1 Rifle or The Garand. The Hall of Fame entry acknowledges both Garand's inventive genius and engineering skills:

Due to his initiative and instinctive inventive genius, the U.S. soldier possessed a firepower advantage during World War II. His remarkable mechanical skill and singular determination resulted in the design of numerous tools, jigs, and gauges necessary for the production of the "Garand Rifle." A remarkable engineering genius in the field of ordnance, his invaluable contributions served an important role in the history of World War II.
