= Phil Page =

American baseball player (1905–1958)

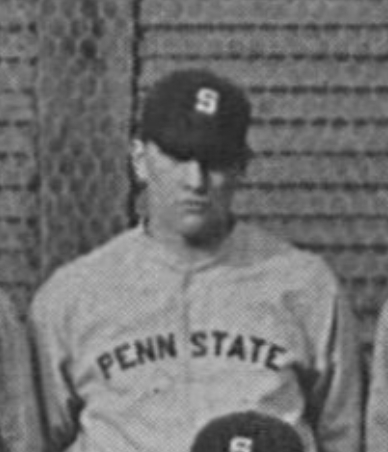
- Pitcher
- Born: August 23, 1905; Springfield, Massachusetts, U.S.
- Died: July 27, 1958 (aged 52); Springfield, Massachusetts, U.S.
- Batted: Right Threw: Left

MLB debut
- September 18, 1928, for the Detroit Tigers

Last MLB appearance
- May 13, 1934, for the Brooklyn Dodgers

MLB statistics
- Win–loss record: 3–3
- Earned run average: 6.23
- Strikeouts: 15
- Stats at Baseball Reference

Teams
- Detroit Tigers (1928–1930); Brooklyn Dodgers (1934)

Philippe Rausac Page (August 23, 1905 – July 27, 1958) was an American professional baseball player, coach, manager and scout. A left-handed pitcher, he worked in 31 Major League games over four seasons for the Detroit Tigers and Brooklyn Dodgers.

Page was born in Springfield, Massachusetts, and attended Penn State University. He was listed at 6 feet 2 inches (1.88 m) tall and 175 pounds (79 kg).

On September 18, 1928, at the age of 23, Page made his big league debut with the Tigers. In parts of three seasons with the Tigers, Page went 2–3 in 25 games, six of them as a starter. He pitched for the minor league Seattle Indians of the Pacific Coast League from 1931 to 1933 and began the 1934 season as a relief pitcher with the Dodgers. In six games with them, he went 1–0 with an earned run average of 5.40.

As with many pre-1950 pitchers, Page had poor control. In 69 1/3 innings pitched, he walked 44 and struck out only 15.

At the plate, Page went three for 18 for a .167 batting average, while, in the field, he committed two errors for a .926 career fielding percentage.

On September 10, 1929, Page gave up Lou Gehrig's fifth career grand slam. It was a first inning blast in New York.

On May 13, 1934, Page played his final Major League game, but he remained in professional baseball. He became a manager, coach and scout in the New York Yankees' organization, and served six seasons (1947–52) as a Major League coach for the Cincinnati Reds, working under four different managers.

Phil Page died at the age of 52 from a heart attack on July 27, 1958, in Springfield, and was buried in Hillcrest Park Cemetery in his native city.
