= Vancouver Canadians (PCL) =

- 1978–1999; Vancouver, British Columbia

Minor league affiliations
- Class: Triple-A (1978–1999)
- League: Pacific Coast League (1978–1999)

Major league affiliations
- Team: Oakland Athletics (1999); California/Anaheim Angels (1993–1998); Chicago White Sox (1988–1992); Pittsburgh Pirates (1987); Milwaukee Brewers (1979–1986); Oakland Athletics (1978)

Minor league titles
- Class titles (1): 1999
- League titles (3): 1985; 1989; 1999
- Conference titles (1): 1999
- Division titles (7): 1985; 1986; 1988; 1989; 1992; 1994; 1999

Team data
- Name: Vancouver Canadians (1978–1999)
- Colors: Blue, red, white (1978–1992); Navy blue, red, white (1993–1999)
- Ballpark: Nat Bailey Stadium (1978–1999)

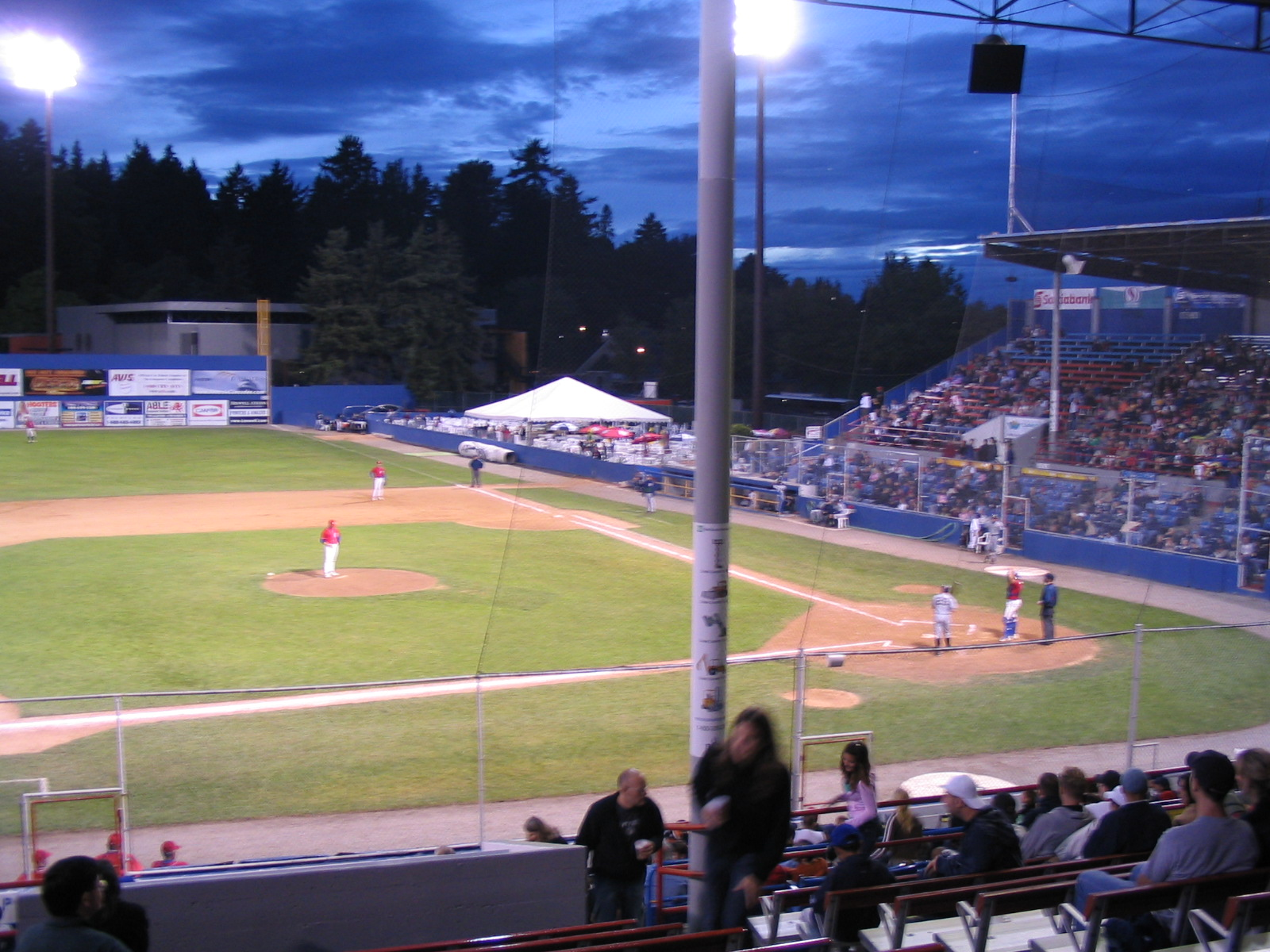
Nat Bailey Stadium

The Vancouver Canadians were a Minor League Baseball team of the Triple-A Pacific Coast League from 1978 to 1999. They were located in Vancouver, British Columbia and played their home games at Nat Bailey Stadium.

== History ==
Vancouver, a city with storied baseball history, had been without a professional team since the departure of the Vancouver Mounties in 1969. Harry Ornest secured the rights to a Triple-A Pacific Coast League franchise for the city called the Vancouver Canadians; they began play in 1978 as an affiliate of the Oakland Athletics.

The Canadians went 74–65 in their inaugural campaign, but missed the postseason two and a half games behind the Portland Beavers. Entering the 1979 season, the Canadians shifted their affiliation to the Milwaukee Brewers. Vancouver finished at the top of the North Division standings with a record of 79–68. The Canadians faced the Hawaii Islanders in the division series but lost in three games. The following year, they returned to the postseason but suffered the same fate, losing to Hawaii in the division series.

Vancouver returned to the postseason in 1985. The Canadians swept the Calgary Cannons in the division series and the Phoenix Giants in the finals to claim their first Pacific Coast League championship. In an effort to repeat as champions, Vancouver finished with the PCL's best regular-season record at 85–53. The Canadians defeated the Tacoma Tigers to win the division title, but lost the championship round to the Las Vegas Stars in a full five games.

In 1987, the Canadians shifted their affiliation to the Pittsburgh Pirates. The relationship lasted only one year after which the club signed a player development contract with the Chicago White Sox. In their first season with Chicago, the team returned to the postseason. Vancouver swept Portland in the division series. Facing Las Vegas, the Canadians lost the championship series in five games. In 1989, the Canadians earned a playoff entry and defeated Calgary to win the North Division title. Vancouver defeated the Albuquerque Dukes in the championship series to close out the decade as Pacific Coast League champions. In 1992, they won their fifth division title outlasting the Portland Beavers. The south division winner, the Colorado Springs Sky Sox, outlasted Vancouver for the league championship in a series that went the full five games. Following the season, the White Sox transferred their Triple-A affiliation to Nashville.

Vancouver entered into a new player development contract with the California Angels in 1993. In their second year linked with the Angels, they won the division title besting the Salt Lake Buzz. The Canadians faced the Albuquerque Dukes in the championship series, but were denied, losing 3–2. The club made postseason appearances in 1995 and 1997, but lost 3 games to 1 in both series to Salt Lake and the Edmonton Trappers, respectively. After the 1998 season, the Angels ended their relationship with Vancouver and signed on with Salt Lake.

In the winter of 1998, Art Savage purchased the franchise and announced his intention to relocate the team. Moreover, the Canadians and the Oakland Athletics, who had were the club's first affiliate in 1978, signed a new agreement. The season would be of significance for baseball in Vancouver. The club posted an 84–58 record to win the west division. Vancouver defeated Salt Lake to earn the Pacific Conference title. The Canadians advanced to the championship series to face the Oklahoma RedHawks. Vancouver took the series in four games to claim the club's third Pacific Coast League championship. Resurrected in 1998, the Triple-A World Series pitted the Pacific Coast League's Canadians against their International League counterpart Charlotte Knights. With a young roster that included Barry Zito, Tim Hudson, and Mark Mulder, the Canadians and Knights traded wins through the first four games of the series. In the rubber match, Vancouver routed the Knights 16–2 to win the Triple-A World Series crown. Terrance Long earned the series Most Valuable Player Award with a slash line of .429, 9 hits, and 10 runs batted in.

Despite a banner year, it would be Vancouver's last at the Triple-A level. After 22 seasons, the franchise moved south to Sacramento, California, where a new US$40 million ballpark awaited. Upon relocating to California's capital city, the team became the Sacramento River Cats. Vancouver would not be without baseball as the Southern Oregon Timberjacks of the Northwest League announced relocation to fill the void in Vancouver. The Canadians name resumed as members of the Class A Short Season Northwest League and then in 2021 became part of the High-A West of Minor League Baseball affiliated with the Toronto Blue Jays of Major League Baseball.

== Ballpark ==
The Canadians played their home games at Nat Bailey Stadium.

== Season-by-season record ==
| Season | PDC | Division | Finish | Wins | Losses | Win% | Postseason | Manager | Attendance |
|---|---|---|---|---|---|---|---|---|---|
Vancouver Canadians
| 1978 | OAK | West | 3rd | 74 | 65 | .532 | | Jim Marshall | 123,466 |
| 1979 | MIL | North | 1st | 79 | 68 | .537 | Lost to Hawaii in division series 2–1 | John Felske | 131,367 |
| 1980 | MIL | North | 1st | 79 | 60 | .568 | Lost to Hawaii in division series 2–1 | Bob Didier | 150,758 |
| 1981 | MIL | North | 5th | 56 | 76 | .424 | | Lee Sigman | 127,161 |
| 1982 | MIL | North | 3rd | 72 | 72 | .500 | | Dick Phillips | 158,767 |
| 1983 | MIL | North | 5th | 60 | 80 | .429 | | Dick Phillips | 179,337 |
| 1984 | MIL | North | 2nd | 71 | 71 | .500 | | Tony Muser | 147,599 |
| 1985 | MIL | North | 1st | 79 | 64 | .552 | Defeated Albuquerque in division series 3–0; Defeated Phoenix in championship series 3–0 | Tom Trebelhorn | 199,781 |
| 1986 | MIL | North | 1st | 85 | 53 | .616 | Defeated Tacoma in division series 3–0; Lost to Las Vegas in championship series 3–2 | Terry Bevington | 231,819 |
| 1987 | PIT | North | 3rd | 72 | 72 | .500 | | Rocky Bridges | 338,614 |
| 1988 | CHW | North | 1st | 85 | 57 | .599 | Defeated Portland in division series 3–0; Lost to Las Vegas in championship series 3–1 | Terry Bevington | 386,220 |
| 1989 | CHW | North | 2nd | 73 | 69 | .514 | Defeated Calgary in division series 3–0; Defeated Albuquerque in championship series 3–1 | Terry Bevington | 281,812 |
| 1990 | CHW | North | 3rd | 74 | 67 | .525 | | Marv Foley | 281,540 |
| 1991 | CHW | North | 5th | 49 | 86 | .363 | | Rick Renick | 288,978 |
| 1992 | CHW | North | 2nd | 81 | 61 | .570 | Defeated Portland in division series 3–2; Lost to Colorado Springs in championship series 3–2 | Rick Renick | 333,564 |
| 1993 | CAL | North | 2nd | 72 | 68 | .514 | | Max Oliveras | 349,726 |
| 1994 | CAL | North | 1st | 77 | 65 | .542 | Defeated Salt Lake in division series 3–2; Lost to Albuquerque in championship series 3–2 | Don Long | 320,863 |
| 1995 | CAL | North | 1st | 81 | 60 | .574 | Lost to Salt Lake in division series 3–1 | Don Long | 305,739 |
| 1996 | CAL | North | 1st | 68 | 70 | .493 | | Don Long | 334,800 |
Vancouver Canadians
| 1997 | ANA | North | 3rd | 75 | 68 | .524 | Lost to Edmonton in division series 3–1 | Don Long | 303,148 |
| 1998 | ANA | West | 4th | 53 | 90 | .371 | | Mitch Seoane | 284,935 |
| 1999 | OAK | West | 1st | 84 | 58 | .592 | Defeated Salt Lake in conference series 3–2; Defeated Oklahoma in championship series 3–1; Defeated Charlotte in Triple-A World Series 3–2 | Mike Quade | 241,461 |

| Division winner | Conference champions | League champions | Class champions |

| Preceded by Expansion franchise | Pacific Coast League franchise 1978–1999 | Succeeded by Sacramento River Cats |
