= Nat Bailey =

American-born Canadian restaurateur

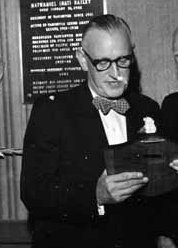
- Bailey in 1961
- Born: January 31, 1902; Saint Paul, Minnesota, U.S.
- Died: March 27, 1978 (aged 76); Vancouver, British Columbia, Canada
- Occupation: Restaurateur
- Known for: Founder of White Spot
- Baseball career

Member of the Canadian

Baseball Hall of Fame
- Induction: 2013

Nathaniel Ryal Bailey (January 31, 1902 – March 27, 1978), better known as Nat Bailey, was an American-born Canadian restaurateur, and the founder of White Spot restaurants. He is known for building the first drive-in restaurant in Canada, in 1928, and developing the first carhop tray. His chain of restaurants continues to thrive today.

== Biography ==
Born in Saint Paul, Minnesota, in 1902, Bailey moved to Vancouver, British Columbia, in 1913. In the 1920s, he operated a traveling lunch counter in Vancouver, operating out of a 1918 Model T. He sold hotdogs for a dime and ice cream for a nickel. In 1928, Bailey founded the first White Spot restaurant. By 1955, the chain was serving 10,000 cars a day and 110,000 customers a week. The chain was sold to General Foods in 1968 when Bailey retired.

Bailey was a Freemason, and supporter of the Marpole Rotary Club, as well as the Chamber of Commerce. He was also a supporter of little league baseball in the city of Vancouver and was a part owner of the Vancouver Mounties minor-league team.

Bailey died in 1978 at Vancouver General Hospital at age 76.

Bailey's love of baseball was commemorated with the renaming of Capilano Stadium to Nat Bailey Stadium after his death. The stadium has been the home of the Vancouver Canadians, an affiliate of the Toronto Blue Jays, since 2011. Bailey was inducted to the Canadian Baseball Hall of Fame in 2013; he is also an inductee of the Vancouver Baseball Hall of Fame and the British Columbia Sports Hall of Fame.
