= Sacramento River Cats =

- Founded in 2000; West Sacramento, California
Team logo
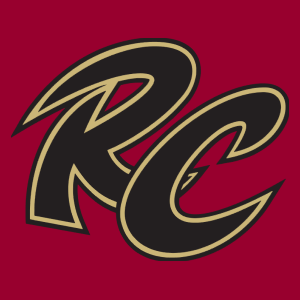
Cap insignia

Minor league affiliations
- Class: Triple-A (2000–present)
- League: Pacific Coast League (2000–present)
- Division: West Division

Major league affiliations
- Team: San Francisco Giants (2015–present)
- Previous teams: Oakland Athletics (2000–2014)

Minor league titles
- Class titles (3): 2007; 2008; 2019
- League titles (5): 2003; 2004; 2007; 2008; 2019
- Conference titles (7): 2003; 2004; 2007; 2008; 2009; 2011; 2019
- Division titles (12): 2000; 2001; 2003; 2004; 2005; 2007; 2008; 2009; 2010; 2011; 2012; 2019

Team data
- Name: Sacramento River Cats (2000–present)
- Colors: Black, brick red, gold
- Mascot: Dinger
- Ballpark: Sutter Health Park (2000–present)
- Owner/ Operator: Vivek Ranadivé
- General manager: Chip Maxson
- Manager: Dave Brundage
- Website: milb.com/sacramento

The Sacramento River Cats are a Minor League Baseball team of the Pacific Coast League (PCL) and are the Triple-A affiliate of the San Francisco Giants. Prior to 2015, the River Cats were the Triple-A affiliate of the Oakland Athletics for 15 seasons. They are based in West Sacramento, California, and play their home games at Sutter Health Park, which opened in 2000 and was known as Raley Field through 2019.

Sacramento was previously represented in the Pacific Coast League by the Solons, a charter member of the league which was founded in 1903. Three different versions of the Solons played in California's capital city in 1903, 1905, from 1909 to 1914, from 1918 to 1960, and from 1974 to 1976. The River Cats have played in the PCL since 2000, including the 2021 season in which it was known as the Triple-A West, and are the only charter city to still host a PCL team.

The River Cats have won five PCL championships. Recently they won the league crown in 2019; previously they won back-to-back in 2007 and 2008. They went on to win the Triple-A National Championship Game in all three seasons. Sacramento also won the PCL title in 2003 and 2004.

== History ==
Following the 1999 season, the Pacific Coast League's Vancouver Canadians were purchased by a group led by Art Savage, moved south to West Sacramento, and renamed the River Cats for the 2000 season. Savage was the majority owner of the team until his death at age 58 in November 2009. His widow, Susan Savage, became majority owner after her husband's death.

In 2016, Mike Piazza became the first and only former River Cats player to be inducted into the Baseball Hall of Fame, after earning an 83% vote by the committee. Piazza played three games in Sacramento as part of a 2007 rehab assignment before rejoining the Oakland Athletics.

In conjunction with Major League Baseball's restructuring of Minor League Baseball in 2021, the River Cats were organized into the Triple-A West. They also entered into a new 10-year Professional Development License agreement to remain the Triple-A affiliate of the San Francisco Giants through 2030. Sacramento ended the season in fourth place in the Western Division with a 52–65 record. No playoffs were held to determine a league champion; instead, the team with the best regular-season record was declared the winner. However, 10 games that had been postponed from the start of the season were reinserted into the schedule as a postseason tournament called the Triple-A Final Stretch in which all 30 Triple-A clubs competed for the highest winning percentage. Sacramento finished the tournament tied for 20th place with a 4–6 record. In 2022, the Triple-A West became known as the Pacific Coast League, the name historically used by the regional circuit prior to the 2021 reorganization.

In August 2022, owner Susan Savage sold a majority interest in the team to the Sacramento Kings.

In April 2024, it was announced that the major-league Oakland Athletics will be moving to Sacramento to play their home games at Sutter Health Park in 2025 and remain there until 2027 before officially moving their franchise to Las Vegas. The River Cats announced that, tentatively, they will remain as well, playing at Sutter Health Park on days when the Athletics are not playing there.

== Season-by-season records ==
Key
League	The team's final position in the league standings
Division	The team's final position in the divisional standings
GB	Games behind the team that finished in first place in the division that season
‡	Class champions (2000–present)
†	League champions (2000–present)
§	Conference champions (2000–2020)
*	Division champions (2000–2022)

Season-by-season records
Season	League	Regular-season					Postseason			MLB affiliate	Ref.
Season	League	Record	Win %	League	Division	GB	Record	Win %	Result	MLB affiliate	Ref.
2000 *	PCL	90–54	.625	2nd	1st	—	2–3	.400	Result	Won Pacific Conference Southern Division title Lost Pacific Conference title vs. Salt Lake Buzz, 3–2	Oakland Athletics
2001 *	PCL	75–69	.521	5th	1st	—	2–3	.400	Won Pacific Conference Southern Division title Lost Pacific Conference title vs. Tacoma Rainiers, 3–2	Oakland Athletics	
2002	PCL	66–78	.458	14th	3rd	19	—	—	—	Oakland Athletics	
2003 * § †	PCL	92–52	.639	1st	1st	—	6–0	1.000	Won Pacific Conference Southern Division title Won Pacific Conference title vs. Edmonton Trappers, 3–0; Won PCL championship vs. Nashville Sounds, 3–0	Oakland Athletics	
2004 * § †	PCL	79–65	.549	5th	1st	—	6–1	.857	Won Pacific Conference Southern Division title Won Pacific Conference title vs. Portland Beavers, 3–1; Won PCL championship vs. Iowa Cubs, 3–0	Oakland Athletics	
2005 *	PCL	80–64	.556	2nd (tie)	1st	—	2–3	.400	Won Pacific Conference Southern Division title Lost Pacific Conference title vs. Tacoma Rainiers, 3–2	Oakland Athletics	
2006	PCL	78–66	.542	4th	2nd	13	—	—	—	Oakland Athletics	
2007 * § † ‡	PCL	84–60	.583	2nd	1st	—	7–2	.778	Won Pacific Conference Southern Division title Won Pacific Conference title vs. Salt Lake Bees, 3–2; Won PCL championship vs. New Orleans Zephyrs, 3–0; Won Triple-A championship vs. Richmond Braves	Oakland Athletics	
2008 * § † ‡	PCL	83–61	.576	3rd	1st	—	7–2	.778	Won Pacific Conference Southern Division title Won Pacific Conference title vs. Salt Lake Bees, 3–1; Won PCL championship vs. Oklahoma RedHawks, 3–1; Won Triple-A championship vs. Scranton/Wilkes-Barre Yankees	Oakland Athletics	
2009 * §	PCL	86–57	.601	1st	1st	—	3–4	.429	Won Pacific Conference Southern Division title Won Pacific Conference title vs. Tacoma Rainiers, 3–1; Lost PCL championship vs. Memphis Redbirds, 3–0	Oakland Athletics	
2010 *	PCL	79–65	.549	4th	1st	—	2–3	.400	Won Pacific Conference Southern Division title Lost Pacific Conference title vs. Tacoma Rainiers, 3–2	Oakland Athletics	
2011 * §	PCL	88–56	.611	1st	1st	—	3–5	.375	Won Pacific Conference Southern Division title Won Pacific Conference title vs. Reno Aces, 3–2; Lost PCL championship vs. Omaha Storm Chasers, 3–0	Oakland Athletics	
2012 *	PCL	86–58	.597	1st	1st	—	2–3	.400	Won Pacific Conference Southern Division title Lost Pacific Conference title vs. Reno Aces, 3–2	Oakland Athletics	
2013	PCL	79–65	.549	3rd	2nd	2	—	—	—	Oakland Athletics	
2014	PCL	79–65	.549	4th	2nd	2	—	—	—	Oakland Athletics	
2015	PCL	71–73	.493	9th	2nd	13 1/2	—	—	—	San Francisco Giants	
2016	PCL	69–75	.479	12th	4th	12 1/2	—	—	—	San Francisco Giants	
2017	PCL	64–77	.454	14th	4th	15 1/2	—	—	—	San Francisco Giants	
2018	PCL	55–85	.393	15th	4th	27 1/2	—	—	—	San Francisco Giants	
2019 * § † ‡	PCL	73–67	.521	7th	1st	—	7–2	.778	Won Pacific Conference Northern Division title Won Pacific Conference title vs. Las Vegas Aviators, 3–2; Won PCL championship vs. Round Rock Express, 3–0; Won Triple-A championship vs. Columbus Clippers	San Francisco Giants	
2020	PCL	Season cancelled (COVID-19 pandemic)								San Francisco Giants	
2021	AAAW	56–71 (Note: In 2021, the team with the best record at the end of the regular-season was declared the Triple-A West champion. Sacramento had a 52–65 (.444) record, 19 1/2 games behind first place, which put them 7th in the league and 4th in their division. The regular-season was followed by the Triple-A Final Stretch, a 10-game postseason tournament in which all 30 Triple-A clubs competed for the highest winning percentage. Sacramento finished the tournament tied for 20th place with a 4–6 (.400) record.)	.441	8th	4th	20 1/2	—	—	—	San Francisco Giants	
2022	PCL	65–83	.439	9th	5th	20	—	—	—	San Francisco Giants	
2023	PCL	67–82	.450	8th	5th	20 1/2	—	—	—	San Francisco Giants	
2024	PCL	80–70	.533	3rd	2nd	2	—	—	—	San Francisco Giants	
2025	PCL	77–73	.513	5th (tie)	3rd	9	—	—	—	San Francisco Giants	
2026	PCL	79–68	.537	3rd	2nd	7 1/2	—	—	—	San Francisco Giants	
Totals	—	1,980–1,759	.530	—	—	—	49–31	.613	—	—	—

== Attendance ==
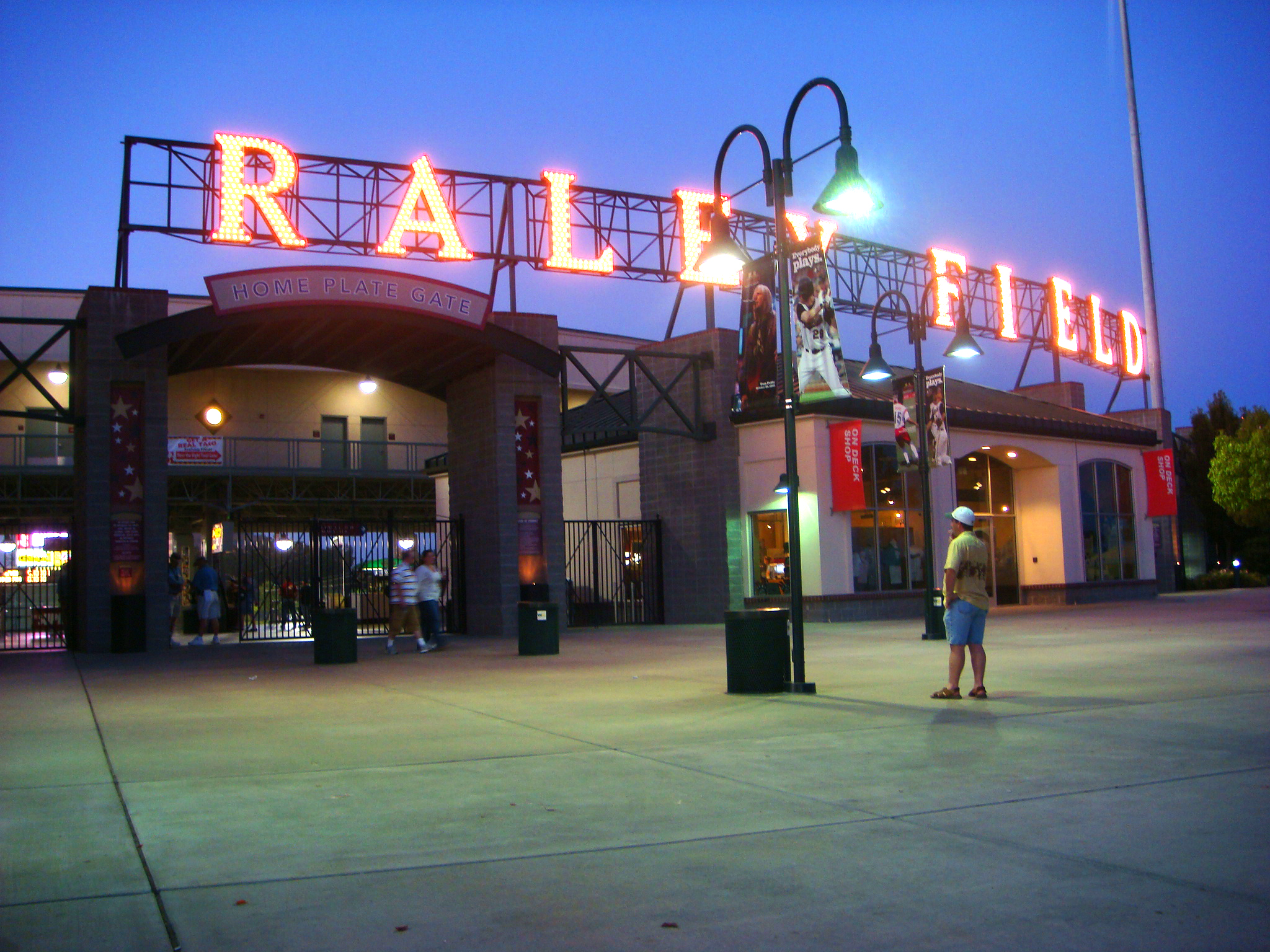
Raley Field in 2007

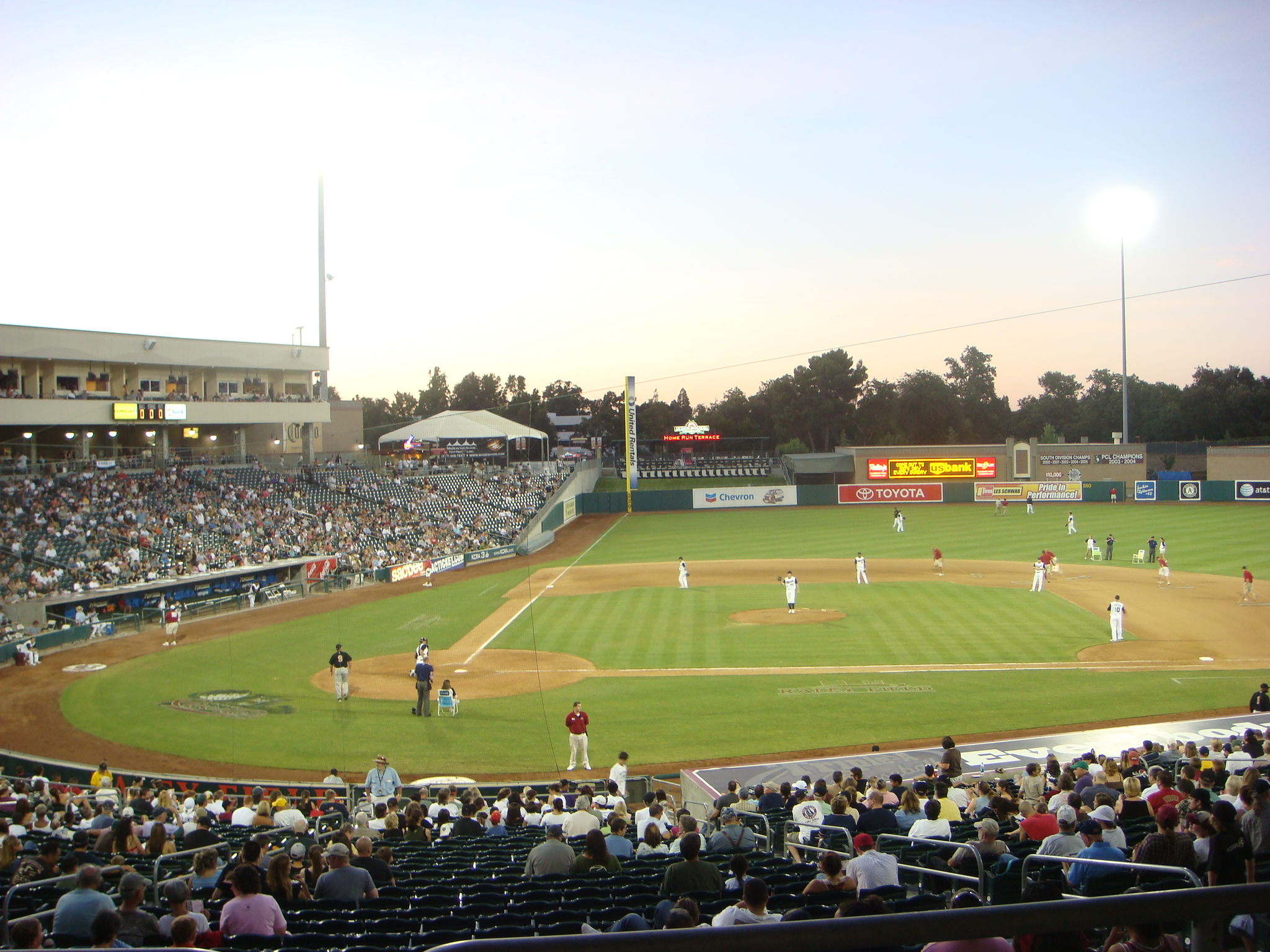
River Cats at Raley Field in 2007

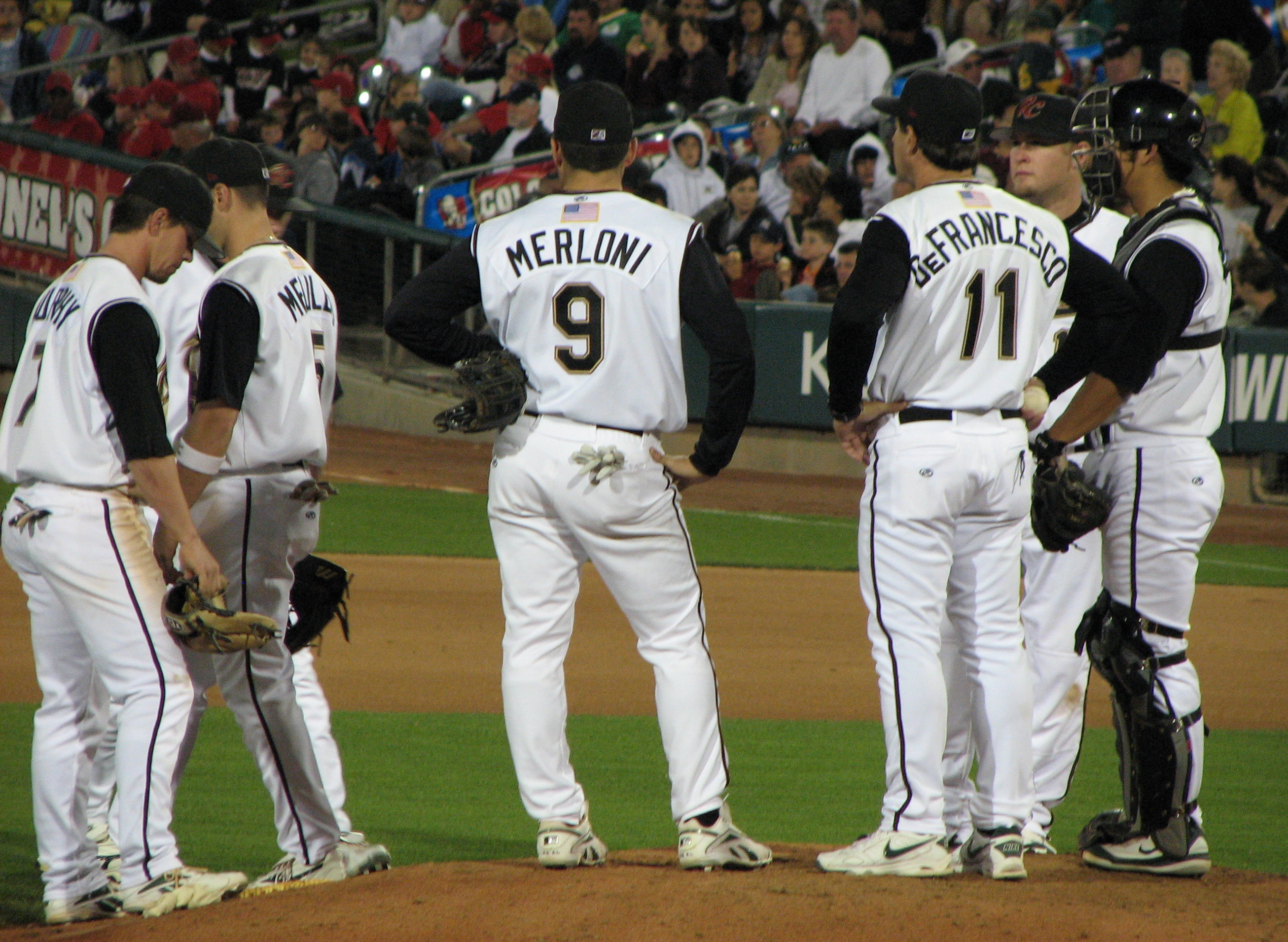
River Cats players in 2007

After arriving at Raley Field in 2000, the River Cats led minor leagues in attendance for nine straight seasons.

In 2015, the team drew 672,354 fans in 72 home games, leading the minor league in total attendance. In 2015, they also drew the second highest attendance per game in the minors with an average of 9,338 fans per game.

For the 2017 season, the team drew 562,237 fans in 70 home games, placing them third in overall attendance for the Pacific Coast League.

Year	Total Attendance	Average
2000	861,808	11,969
2001	901,214	12,516
2002	817,317	11,351
2003	766,326	10,643
2004	751,156	10,432
2005	755,750	10,496
2006	728,227	10,256
2007	710,235	10,003
2008	700,168	9,724
2009	657,095	9,126
2010	657,910	9,138
2011	600,306	8,455
2012	586,090	8,140
2013	607,329	8,435
2014	607,839	8,561
2015	672,354	9,338
2016	609,666	8,587
2017	562,237	8,032
2018	538,785	7,808
2019	549,440	7,849
2020	n/a	n/a
2021	256,714	4,043
2022	372,769	4,970
2023	388,246	5,177
2024	409,700	5,463
2025	302,973	4,039

== Playoff history ==
The River Cats have won 12 division titles, including back-to-back titles in 2000 and 2001, three years in a row from 2003 to 2005, and six consecutive titles from 2007 to 2012. In 2019, the River Cats snapped a six-year playoff drought by winning the Pacific Northern Division.

The team has won four league championships: 2003, 2004, 2007, and 2008. In 2007, they defeated the Richmond Braves in that year's Bricktown Showdown by a score of 7–1. In 2008 they defeated the Scranton/Wilkes-Barre Yankees, 4–1.

== Roster ==
Sacramento River Cats roster
Players	Coaches/Other
Pitchers: 9 Cristian Alvarado; 58 Will Bednar; 39 Alex Carrillo *; 40 Eric Cerantola *; 55 R. J. Dabovich; 15 Matt Gage * #; 49 Logan Martin; 18 Wilkin Ramos *; 32 Braxton Roxby *; 51 Darien Smith ~; 38 Dale Stanavich; 75 Tyler Vogel; 33 Trystan Vrieling; 7 Ryan Walker *; 56 Joe Whitman; 52 Nick Zwack; Catchers: 5 Thomas Gavello; 48 Fernando Gonzalez; 23 Zach Morgan *; 14 Adrián Sugastey; Infielders: 10 Aeverson Arteaga; 54 Darren Baker *; 28 Parks Harber; 19 Eddys Leonard *; 13 Charlie Szykowny; 26 Diego Velasquez; Outfielders: 23 Victor Bericoto * #; 34 Will Brennan *; 12 Zane Zielinski	Manager: 45 Dave Brundage; Coaches: 8 Jolbert Cabrera (fundamentals); 16 Will Kahn (bullpen catcher); 31 P.J. Pilittere (hitting); 43 Alain Quijano (pitching); 50 Rob Riggins (assistant hitting); 60-day injured list: 40 John Michael Bertrand (full season); -- Reggie Crawford; 7-day injured list; * On San Francisco Giants 40-man roster; ~ Development list; # Rehab assignment; ∞ Reserve list; ‡ Restricted list; § Suspended list; † Temporarily inactive list; Roster updated September 21, 2026; Transactions; → More rosters: MiLB • Pacific Coast League; → San Francisco Giants minor league players

== Players ==
See: Category:Sacramento River Cats players
