= White Spot =

Canadian restaurant chain

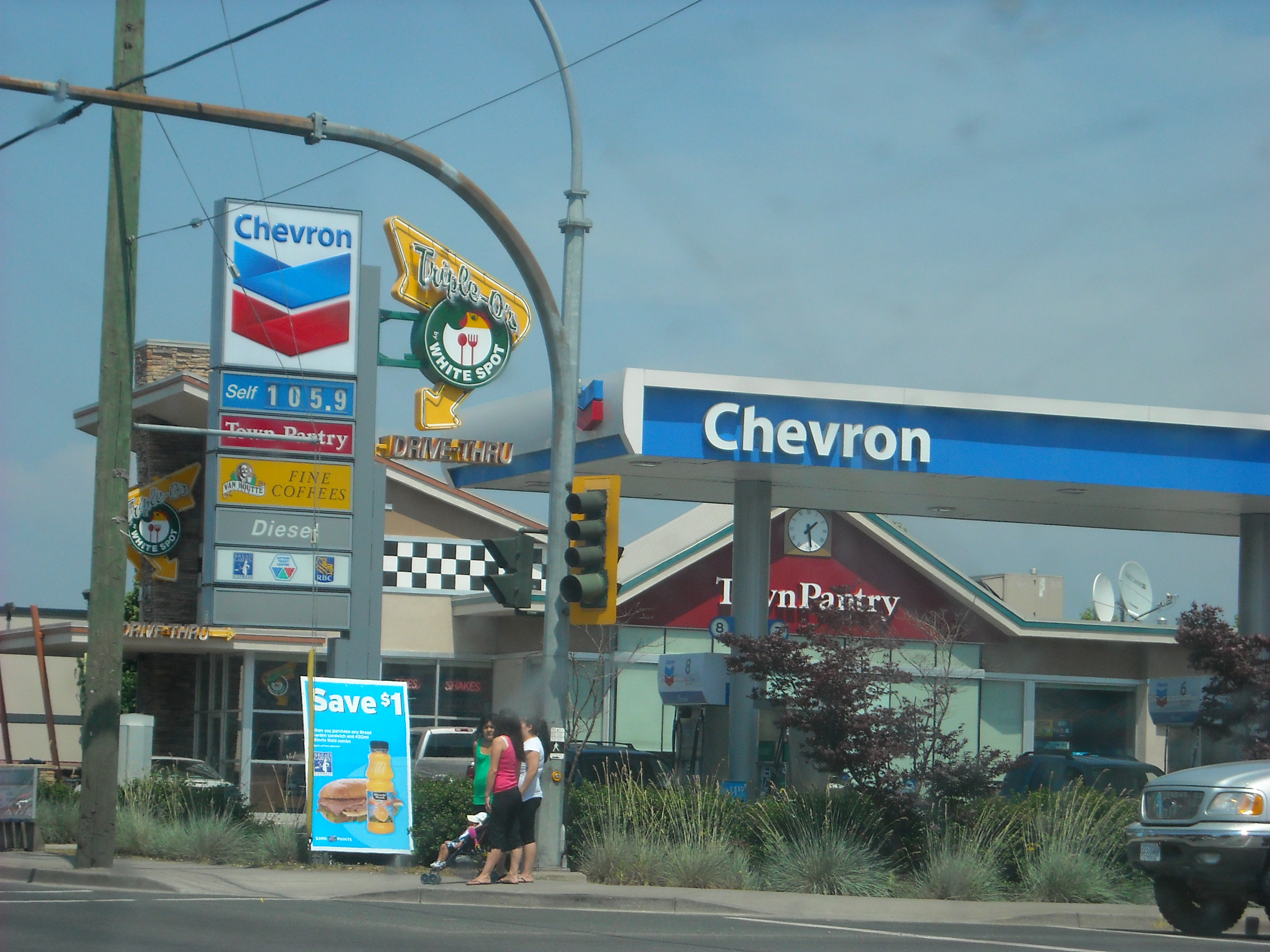
- A White Spot Triple O's inside a Chevron-branded station in Chilliwack, British Columbia
- Founded: June 16, 1928; 98 years ago
- Headquarters: Vancouver, British Columbia, Canada
- Website: White Spot

White Spot is a Canadian restaurant chain based in Vancouver, British Columbia, best known for its hamburgers, Pirate Pak children's meal, "Triple O" sauce, and milkshakes. Along with its related Triple O's quick service brand, the chain operates over 100 locations in British Columbia, Alberta, Ontario and Asia, though Alberta and Ontario only have the Triple O brand.

== History ==
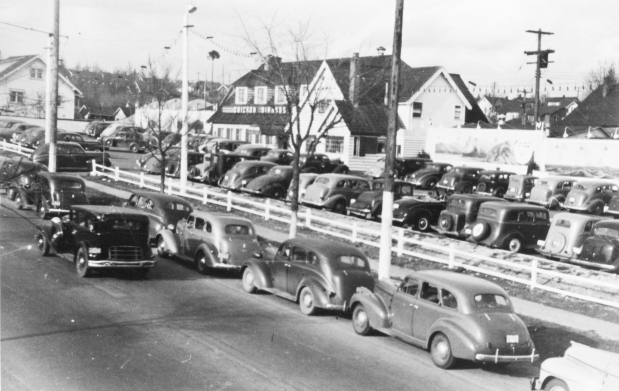
The original White Spot location on Granville Street at W. 67th Avenue

In the 1920s, White Spot's founder, Nat Bailey, operated a travelling lunch counter in Vancouver, operating out of a 1918 Model T. He sold hotdogs for a dime and ice cream for a nickel. In 1928, Bailey founded the first White Spot restaurant. Initially, he had planned on naming the eatery the Granville Barbecue, but changed his mind instead taking the advice of a friend who suggested he name it White Spot after a restaurant on Wilshire Boulevard in Los Angeles, California, which was derived from LA's own nickname at the time, the "White Spot of America," which referred to LA's relative prosperity and low unemployment in such things as buy-local campaigns, but was also used in racial terms, such as a "keep the white spot white" drive to keep non-whites from moving into a white neighborhood.

The first restaurant was located in the Marpole neighbourhood, at 67th and Granville Street, at what would become known as Granville House, in Vancouver, British Columbia. The restaurant was called White Spot Barbecue Sandwiches, evolving into a drive-in and dining room. By 1955, the chain was serving 10,000 cars a day and 110,000 customers a week.

By the 1990s, some White Spot drive-ins were phased out owing to an increase in the number of franchise restaurants and a gradual decrease in the popularity of drive-ins. Granville House was a popular dining spot until 1986 when a fire in the kitchen damaged the building. The restaurant closed permanently at that location shortly thereafter, despite some talk of rebuilding.

=== Franchising and growth ===
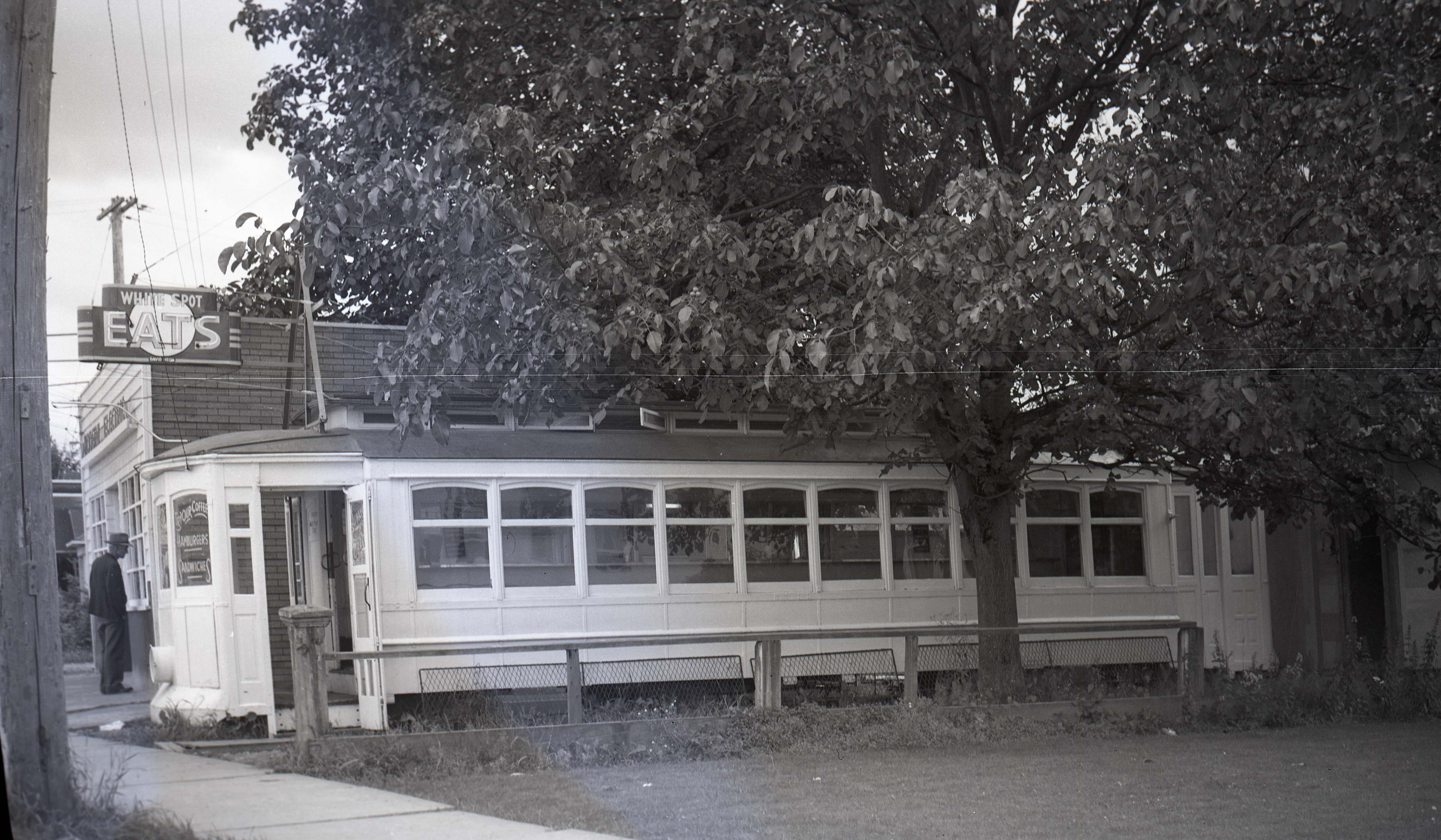
BC Electric Railway streetcar converted into part of a White Spot restaurant. Chilliwack, ca. 1945.

The chain was sold to General Foods in 1968 when Bailey retired. In 1982, White Spot returned to local ownership when the company was purchased by BC businessman Peter Toigo, becoming part of Shato Holdings Limited. After his death in 1993, his sons Peter and Ron Toigo took over ownership.

In 1986, the chain was sued in the court case Gee v. White Spot. The plaintiffs, Mr. Gee and Mr. and Mrs. Pan, claimed damages for botulism poisoning related to a beef dip sandwich. The decision made it easier for diners to sue restaurants for breach of contract and implied warranty instead of the harder-to-prove negligence (Canadian tort law expressly disavows strict product liability).

In 1993, White Spot introduced franchising, and in 1997 it launched its Triple O's quick service brand, which is named after White Spot's trademark hamburger sauce. Since 1999, the company's franchises have been installed on some ships in the BC Ferries fleet. By the 2000s, the chain was opening burger-focused takeouts at its Triple O's locations.

In 2012, 64 White Spot restaurants and 62 Triple O's locations served 17 million customers and generated $200 million in gross revenues.

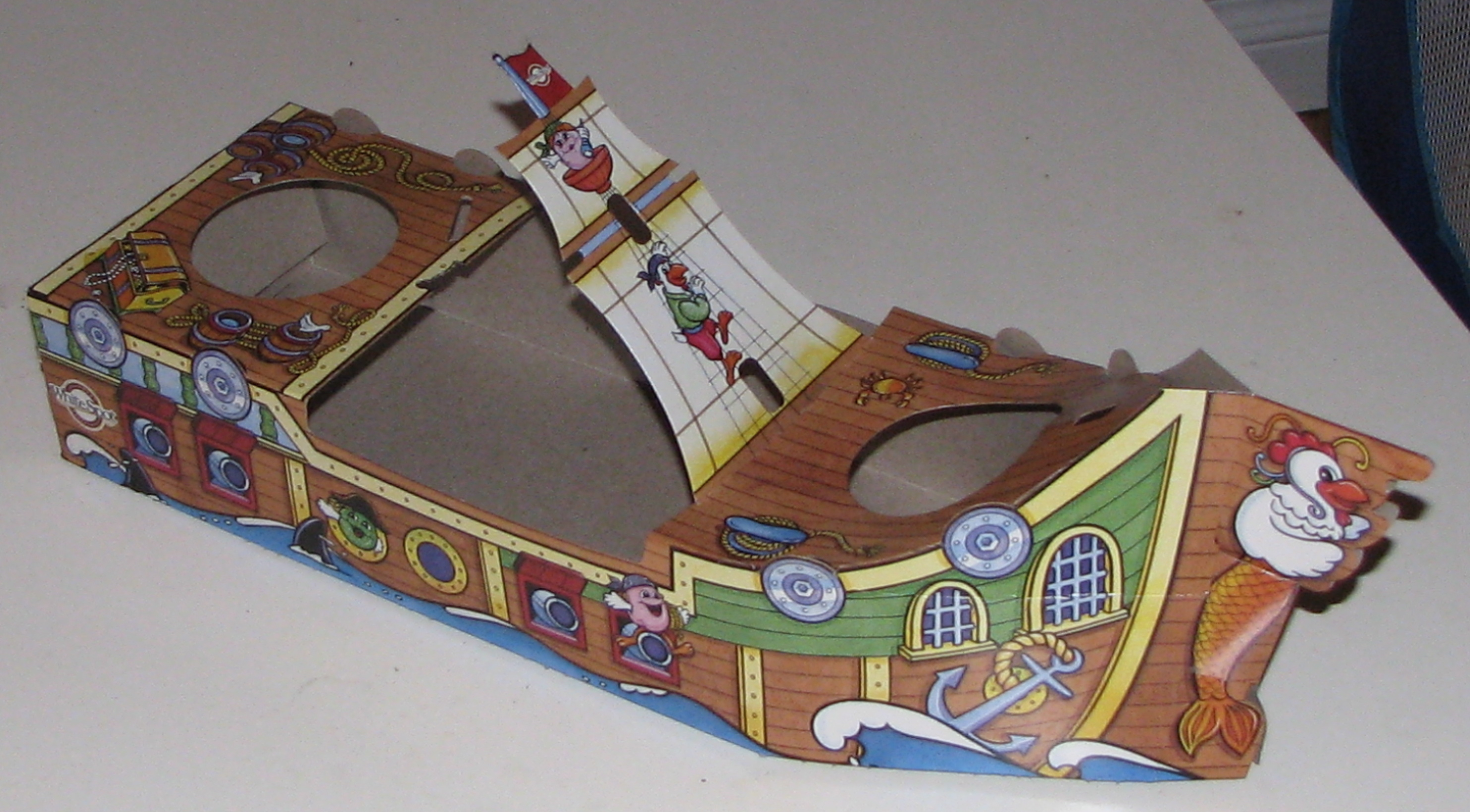
A Pirate Pak without its chocolate doubloon and ice cream

Chef Chuck Currie has been featured in marketing campaigns alongside guest celebrity chefs hailing from Vancouver, including John Bishop, Rob Feenie, Umberto Menghi, and Melissa Craig.

In 2020, White Spot reached an expanded agreement with gas station operator Parkland Corporation, which already operated select Triple O's locations in B.C., mainly at Chevron-branded stations. Under the new agreement, Triple O's expanded into Alberta and Ontario through new locations at additional Parkland-owned stations.

== International locations ==
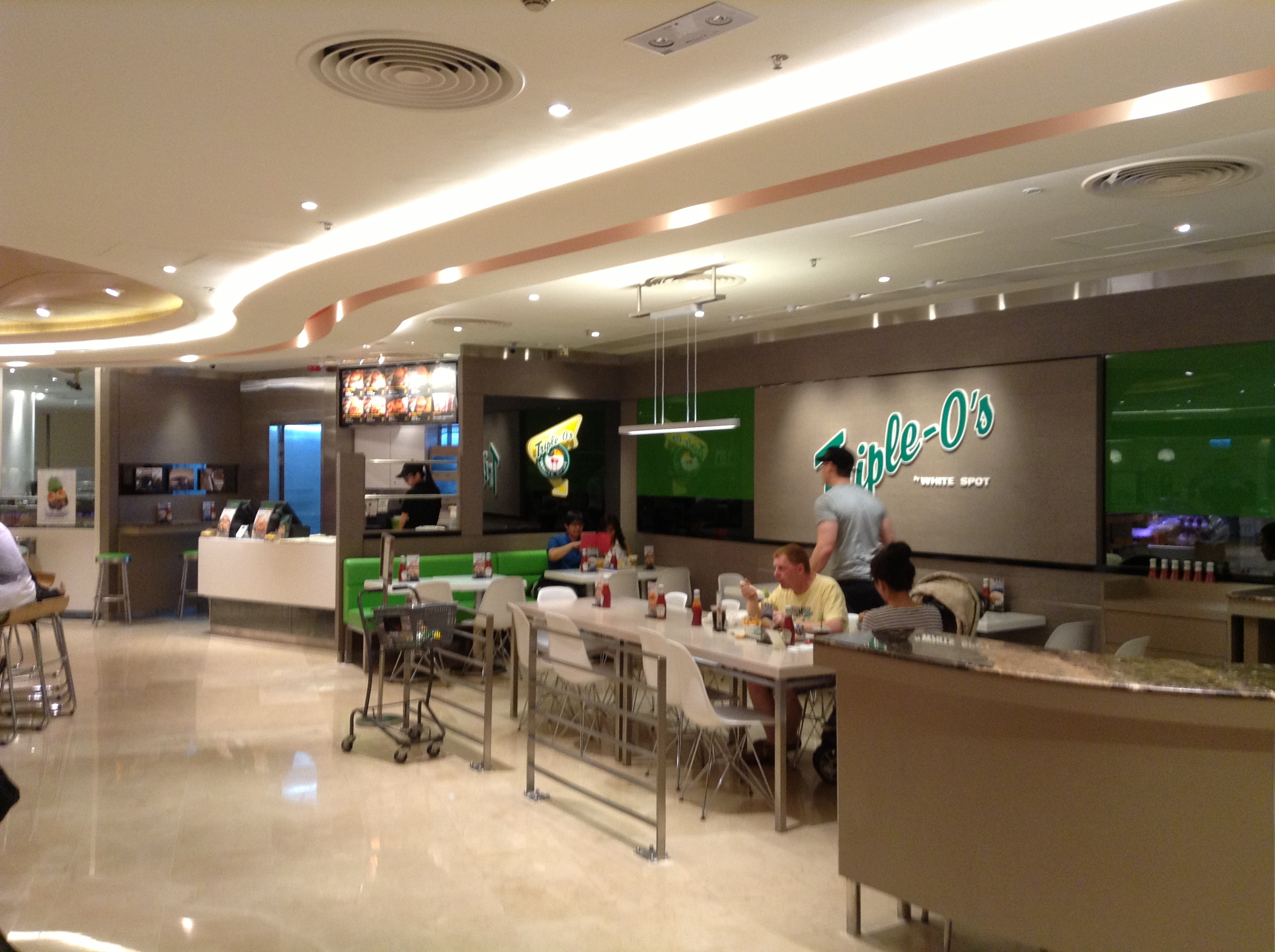
A Triple O's restaurant in Pacific Place, Hong Kong.

Abroad, White Spot has expanded its Triple O's chain into Hong Kong in the early 2000s, Manila in 2014, and Mainland China. In Hong Kong, four such stores can be found at the basement of Pacific Place, and in Exchange Square, on the Hong Kong Island; and at Cooked Deli in the Harbour City shopping mall in Kowloon and in Shatin. The three Hong Kong franchises each record more than twice as many sales as the average location in BC.

In 2009, it was reported that Triple O's had branches in Taiwan.

Macau has its first Triple O's opened in November 2017.

=== Former branches ===
The company opened its first international location across the nearby United States border in Bellingham, Washington, in 1993 with plans to continue expanding in the U.S. Pacific Northwest. The Bellingham location closed three years later due to financial issues and low traffic attributed to a weak Canadian dollar.

A location in Seoul, South Korea, opened in September 2008. It is located near Dosan Park, in the Apgujeong neighbourhood.

All Triple O's branches in Singapore are closed as of the 2010s.

Triple O's had one branch in Thailand, which was permanently closed due to said branch being damaged during anti-government protests in 2010.

== See also ==
- List of Canadian restaurant chains
- List of hamburger restaurants
- List of restaurants in Vancouver
