= Hillcrest Park Cemetery =

Cemetery in Springfield, Massachusetts, USA

Coordinates: 42°07′45.69″N 72°29′35.21″W

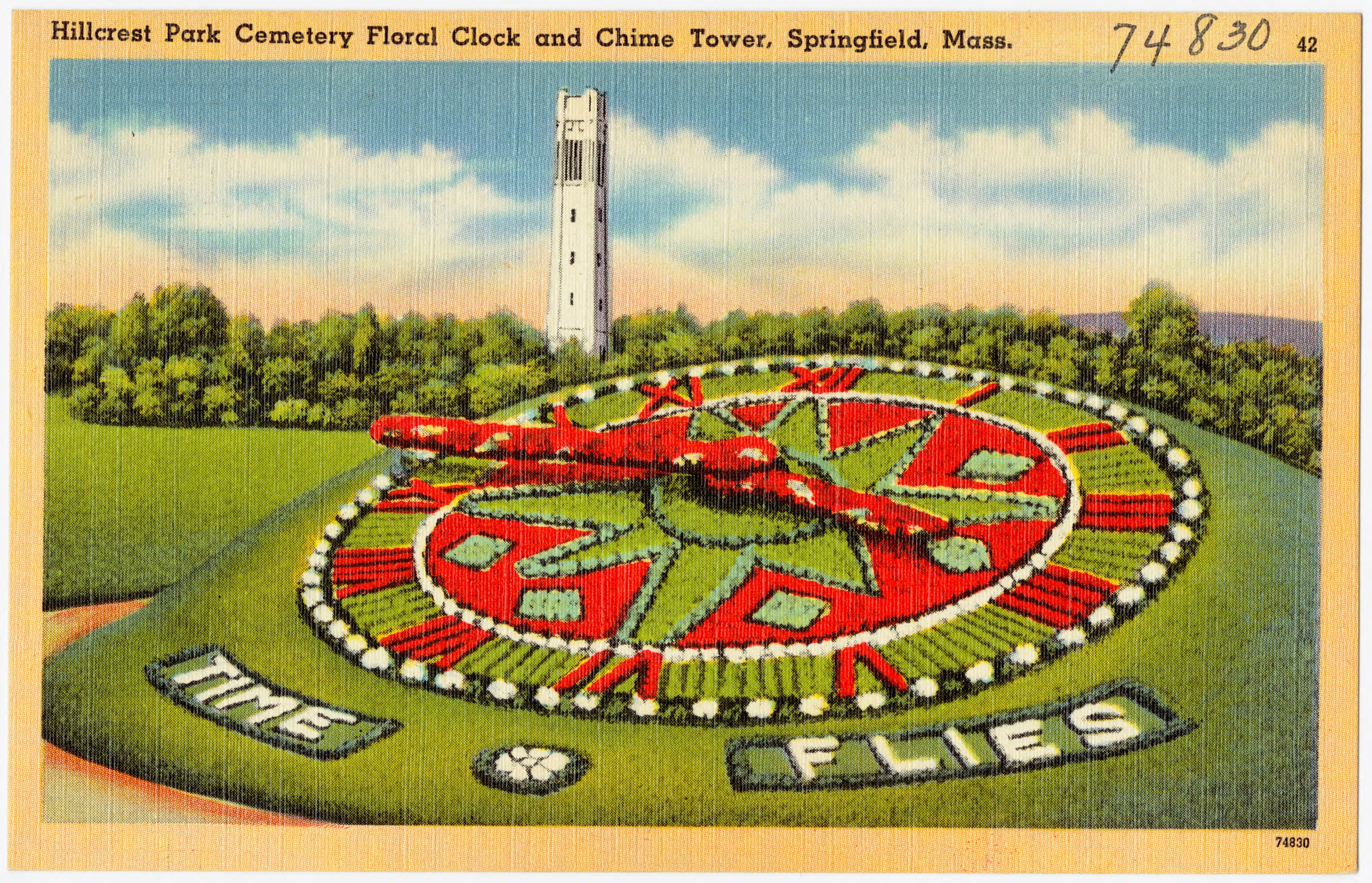
Hillcrest Park Cemetery Floral Clock and Chime Tower, c. 1930–45

The Hillcrest Park Cemetery is located in Springfield, Massachusetts. Although it is not known when it was established, it is known that the Hillcrest Park Cemetery Association – those who oversee the cemetery – was founded in 1924.

== Notable interments ==
- Henry L. Bowles (1866–1932), U.S. congressman
- Jack Butterfield (1919–2010), ice hockey administrator
- Danny Croteau (1958–1972), murder victim
- Frank Crumit (1889–1943), entertainer and composer
- John Garand (1888–1974), arms inventor
- Phil Page (1905–1958), baseball player
- Eddie Shore (1902–1985), hockey player
