= Hillcrest Park =

Park in Vancouver, Canada

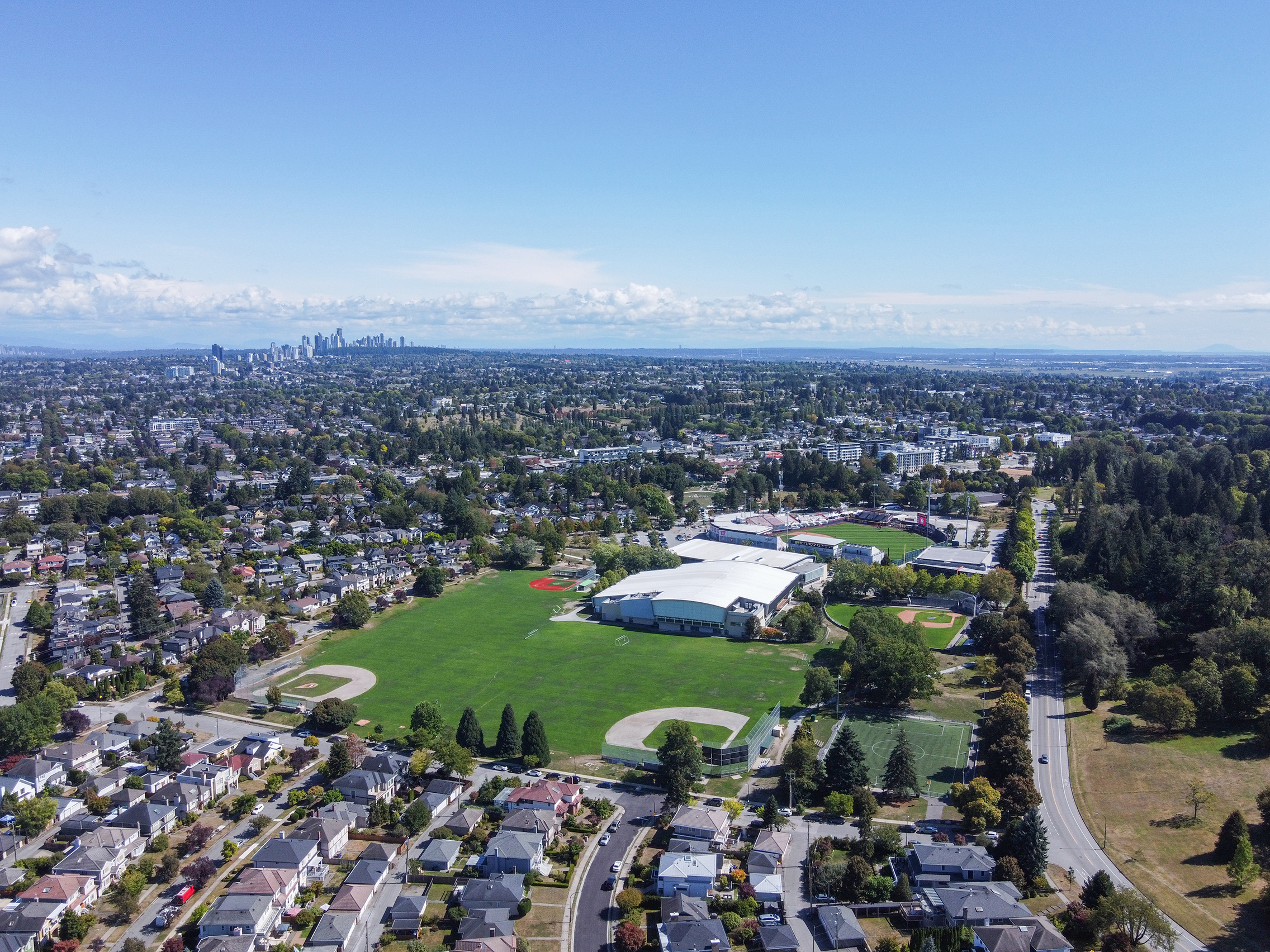
- Aerial view of Hillcrest Park in 2026
- Interactive map of Hillcrest Park
- Type: Public Park
- Location: Vancouver, British Columbia
- Coordinates: 49°14′42″N 123°06′29″W
- Created: 1888
- Operator: City of Vancouver

Hillcrest Park is located in the Riley Park neighbourhood of Vancouver, British Columbia. It is located immediately north of Queen Elizabeth Park and west of Riley Park.

Next to Hillcrest Park is the site containing Nat Bailey Stadium, home of the Vancouver Canadians baseball team; the Millennium Sports Centre, home to both the Phoenix Gymnastics Club and the Pacific Indoor Bowls Club; and the Vancouver Racquets Club.

The little league Little Mountain Baseball has its ballpark and clubhouse in Hillcrest Park. They also use ballparks at Riley Park for the younger age groups. In addition, there are two larger diamonds used by Vancouver Community Baseball. During the soccer season the ballparks are converted to be used as soccer fields by various competitive and recreational leagues.

Hillcrest Park also is home to the Vancouver Curling Club. It had been at the south-west corner of the park in a small building, with only 5 sheets. With the 2010 Winter Olympics coming to Vancouver the club gained and expanded facility, at the Hillcrest Centre, next door to the Millennium Sports Centre. The new facility houses a new community centre, library, ice rink, curling arena, and the Percy Norman Aquatic Centre. Construction of the arena started in March 2007 and was mostly completed by February 2009. The aquatics portion of the building was completed in spring of 2009, and the final renovations to finish the community centre occurred after the 2010 Winter Games.

== Financial Support ==
The project was made available from all levels of government. Through the Canada-BC Infrastructure Program (CBCIP), administered by Western Economic Diversification Canada, the Government of Canada (GoC) and the Province of BC invested $1.7 million. The Vancouver Board of Parks and Recreation provided $250,000, and agreed to lease the land to the Vancouver Millennium Sport Facility Society for $1 per year-an in kind donation equivalent to more than $2 million.
