= Greater Los Angeles Association =

1920s civic group

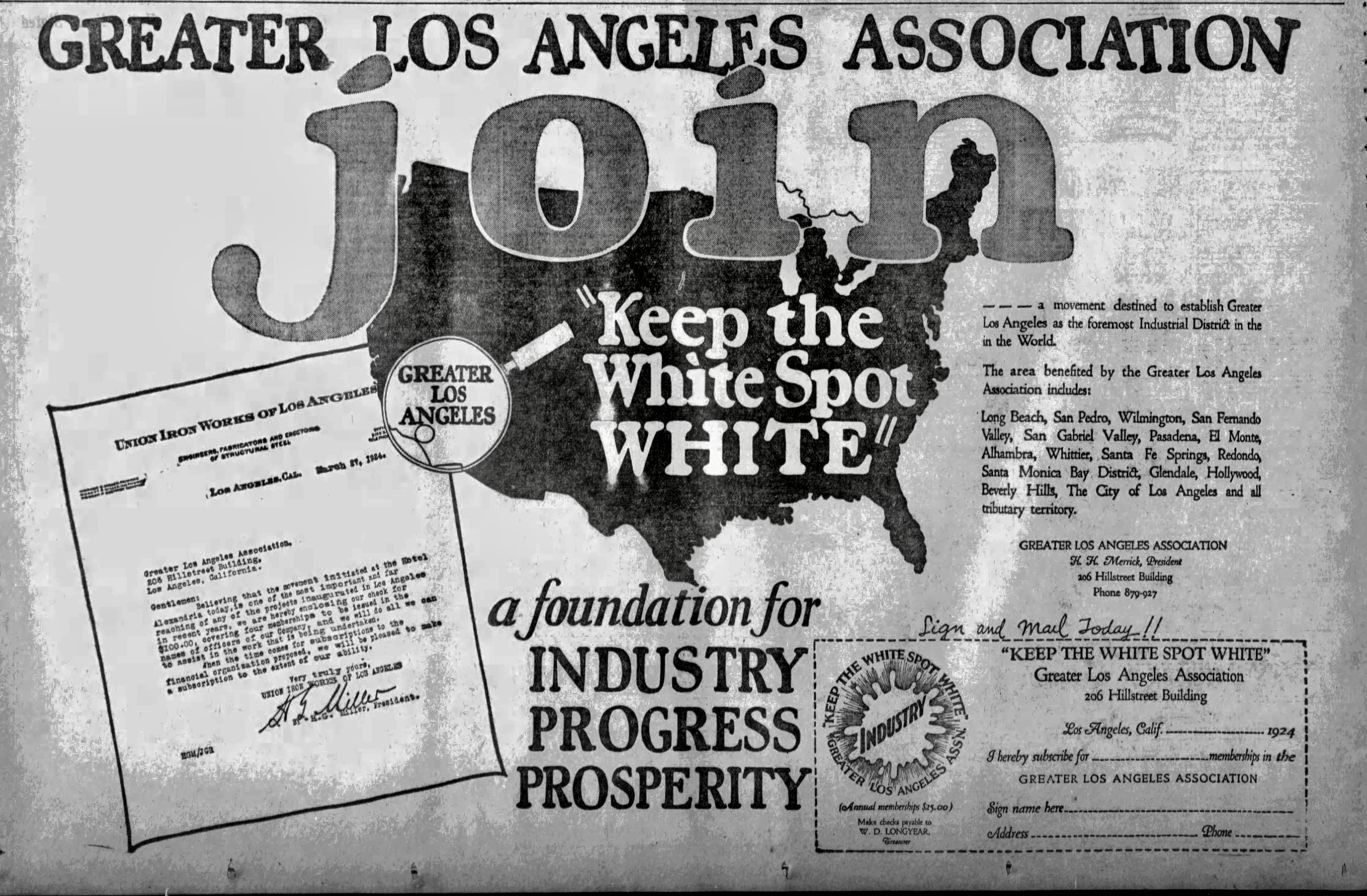
"Join" GREATER LOS ANGELES ASSOCIATION - A Foundation for Industry, Progress, Prosperity (Los Angeles Evening Express, March 29, 1924)

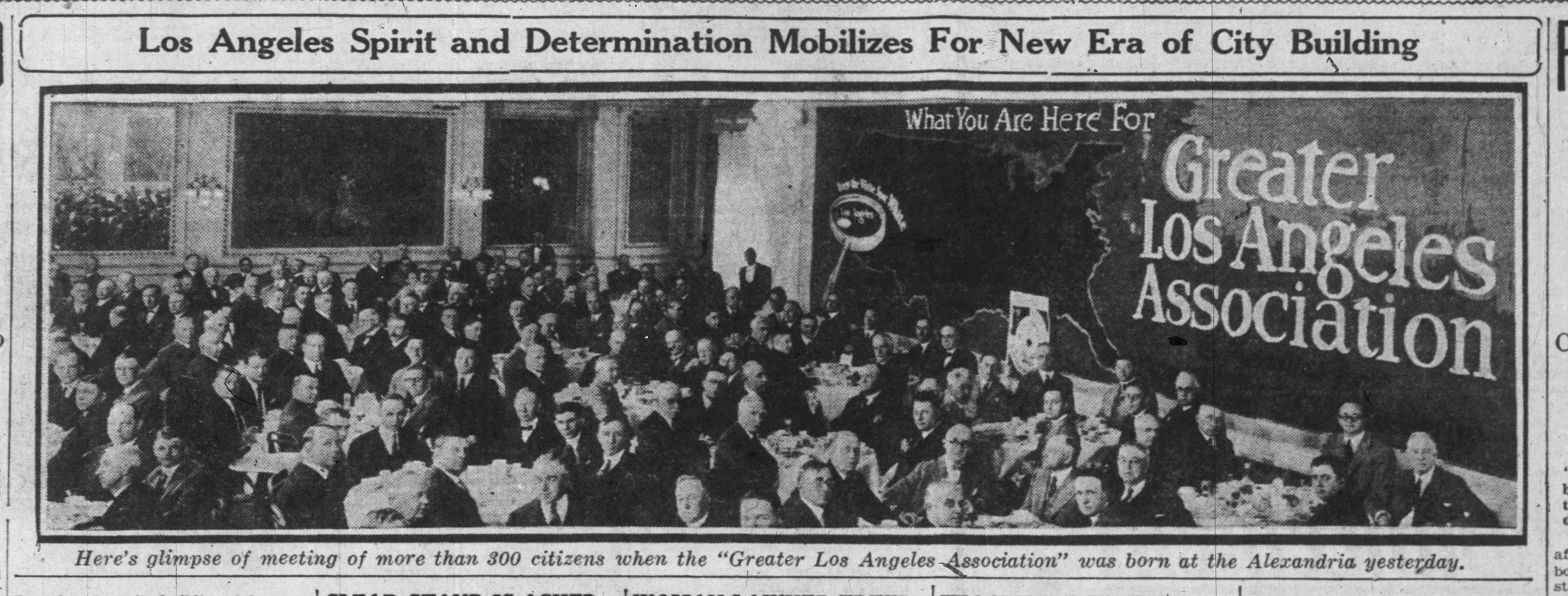
Greater Los Angeles Association organizing meeting (Los Angeles Record, March 28, 1924)

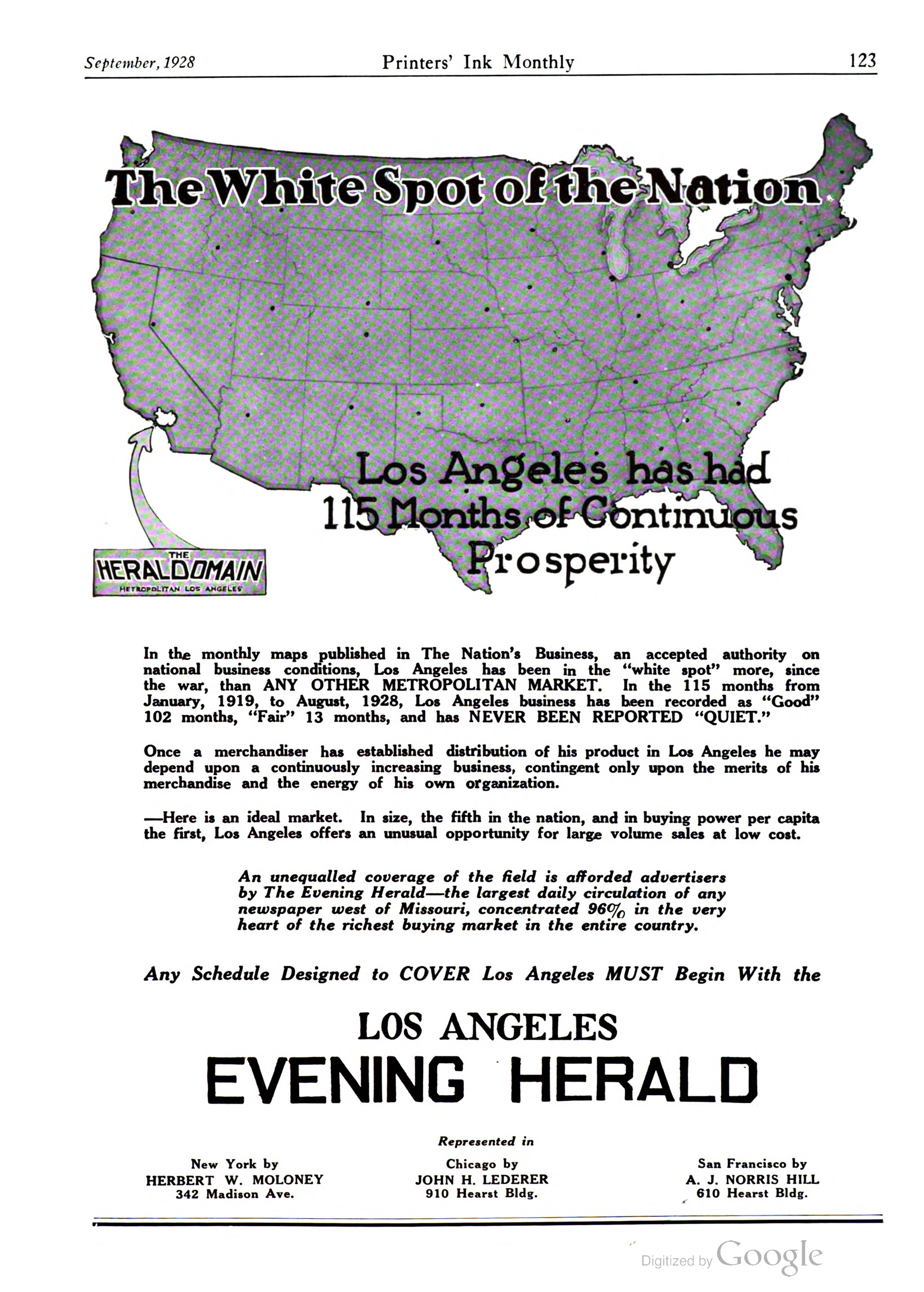
"The White Spot of the Nation"

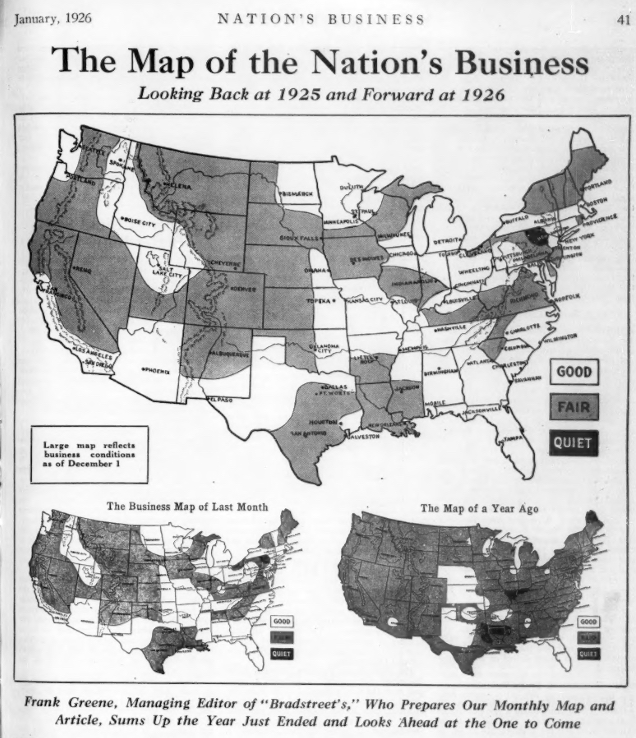
One of the monthly maps from Nation's Business that colored "good" business regions in white

The Greater Los Angeles Association was a 1920s civic-booster group of California, United States that promoted business interests in the area under the slogan "keep the white spot white". The slogan referenced monthly maps published by the U.S. Chamber of Commerce magazine Nation's Business that used different colors to indicate different levels of commercial activity—spots with good levels were colored white.

Organized with a great burst of energy in 1924, the group proper fizzled within a couple of years. However, over time, their phrase the white spot of America became a general descriptor for the Los Angeles area, with its attendant racial and political insinuations. Originally intended to market the city's (and Harry Chandler's) aggressively "open shop" approach to labor relations, it came to be applied by both proponents and detractors to policies like racial covenants restricting housing.

Apparently, when questioned about police vice-protection rackets in the city, Mayor Frank L. Shaw replied that such a notion was ridiculous, as Los Angeles was the "white spot of the nation". (There was absolutely a police vice-protection racket in the city, with Mayor Shaw playing a central role.)

In the 1950s, LAPD Chief of Police William H. Parker used the term when boasting about low crime rates.
